= Thunder Ridge Wilderness =

Protected area in Virginia, US

- IUCN category Ib (wilderness area)
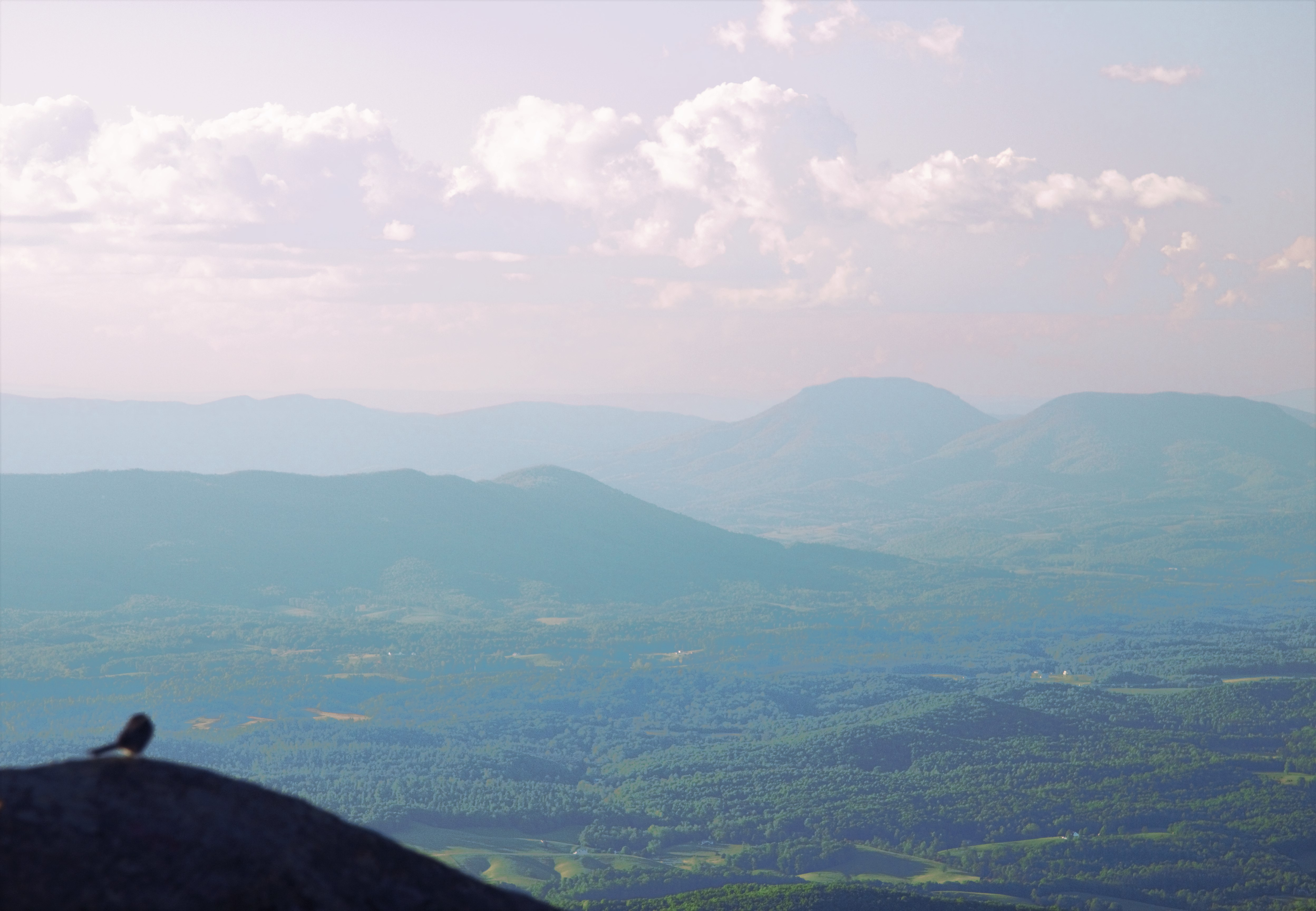
- Looking over Arnold Valley from Thunder Ridge

- Location within Virginia
- Location: Bedford, Rockbridge County, Virginia, United States
- Nearest city: Buena Vista, Virginia
- Coordinates: 37.55417°N 79.47368°W
- Area: 2,344 acres (949 ha)
- Established: 1984
- Administrator: U.S. Forest Service

The Thunder Ridge Wilderness is a 2,344 acres (949 ha) area located near Natural Bridge, Virginia, which is protected by the Eastern Wilderness Act of Congress to maintain its present, natural condition. As part of the National Wilderness Preservation System, it helps to preserve a variety of natural life forms and contributes to a diversity of plant and animal gene pools. Over half of the ecosystems in the United States exist within designated wilderness.

Dominated by Thunder Ridge with steep slopes towering above Arnold Valley, the interior is incredibly rugged, remote and rarely visited. The top of the ridge contains flowers blooming late into summer, long past blooms in the hot valley below. Trillium, may apple, pink lady slipper, Indian cucumber root and columbine flourish in the shade of black cherry trees, northern red oak and hickories.

The area is part of the Glenwood Cluster.

== Location and access ==
Thunder Ridge Wilderness is located in the Jefferson National Forest several miles from Natural Bridge Station, Virginia. It is just south of the James River Face Wilderness, bounded on the northeast by Forest Service Road 35, on the south by the Blue Ridge Parkway and on the northwest by a line approximately parallel to the parkway and offset by about a mile.

There are three trails into the wilderness:

- The Appalachian Trail travels in and out of the wilderness as it crosses the Blue Ridge Parkway giving several trailheads for access to the wilderness.
- Hunting Creek Trail enters the wilderness before meeting the Appalachian Trail. Trailhead on FS 45 at Hunting Creek
- Glenwood Horse Trail, 2.1 mile, 1000 foot elevation change, trailhead on FS 35

There are several overlooks of the wilderness from parking areas along the Blue Ridge Parkway:

- A view over the wilderness can be reached from the Thunder Ridge Parking area, Blue Ridge Parkway milepost 74.7. A short trail from the parking lot leads to an overlook with views to the west over Arnold Valley.
- The Apple Orchard Mountain Overlook at milepost 76.5 is the highest parkway elevation in Virginia with views of the wilderness and the valley below

== Natural history ==
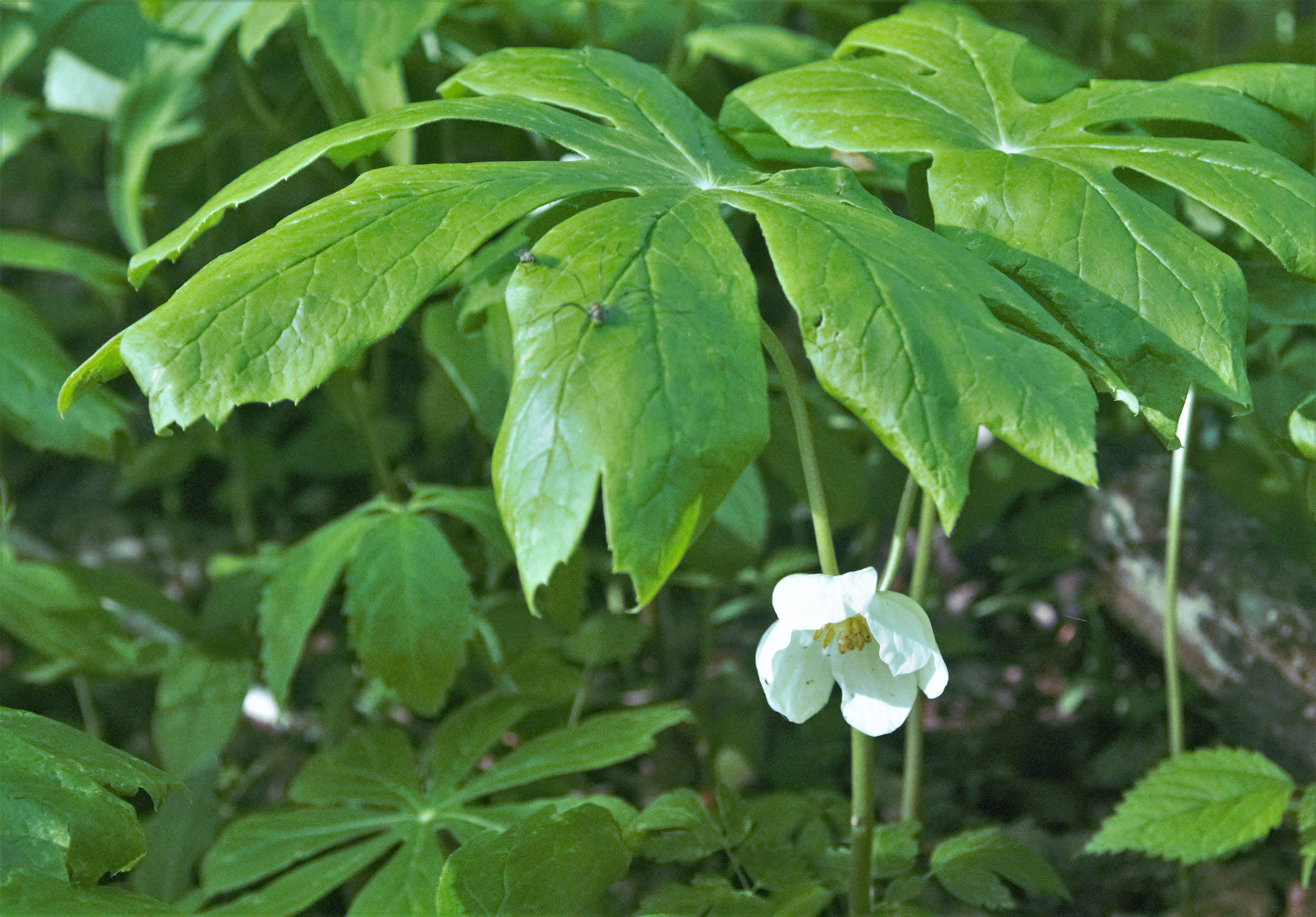
May Apple in the Thunder Ridge Wilderness, Virginia

With very different environments, the area sustains a great variety of trees found in a diversity of habitats. Coves support tulip poplar, oak and hemlock, some very large; the crest of Apple Orchard Mountain has a mix of hardwoods such as red and white oak as well as common persimmon, red spruce and hemlock; and the harsh environment of the dry western slopes support pitch pine, Virginia pine and chestnut oak.

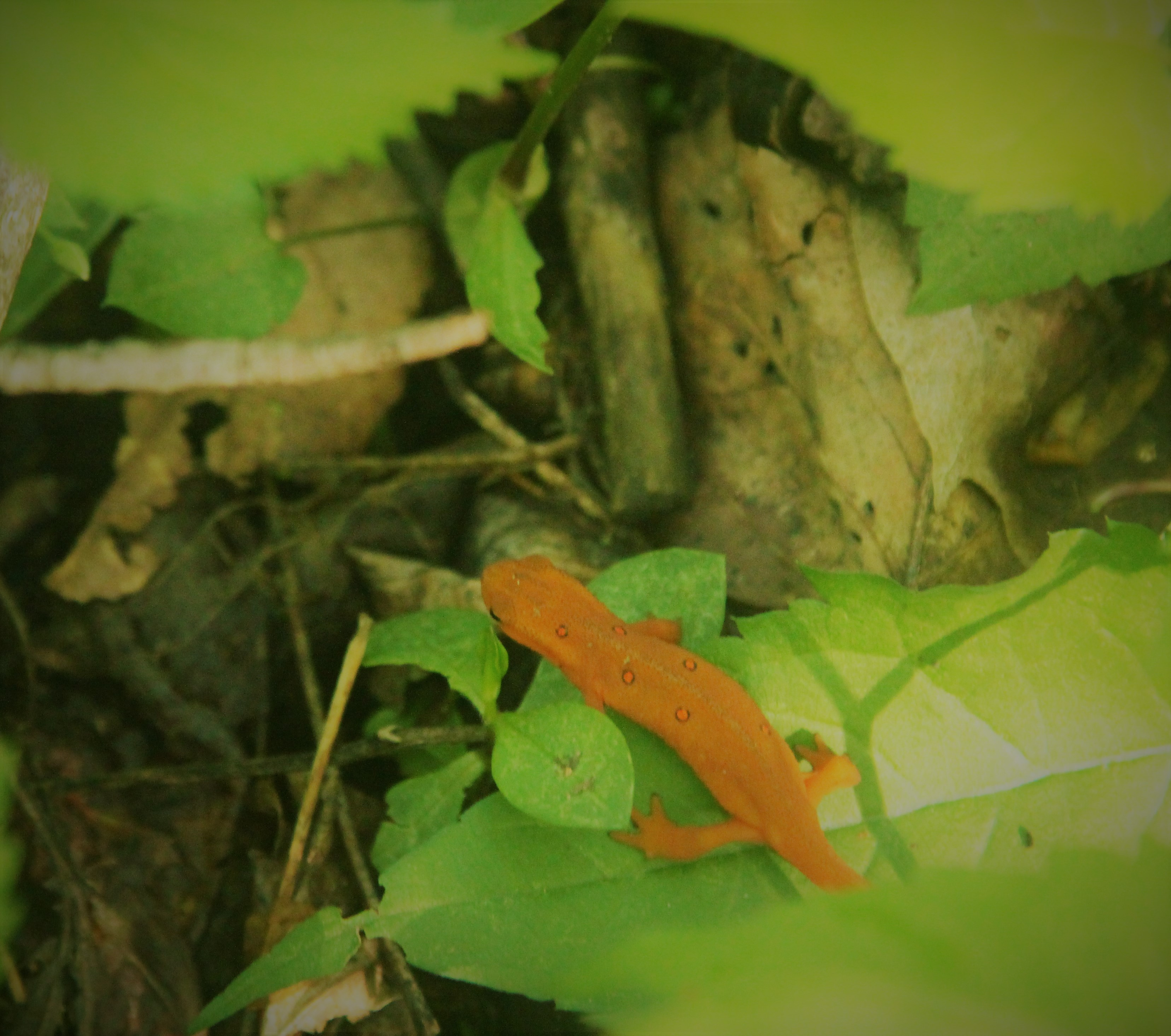
Red Eft

The moist forests provide good habitat for salamanders. The world’s greatest diversity of salamanders is found in the southeastern United States. More than 55 species are located in Virginia, with over 15 in the Thunder Ridge wilderness or adjacent public and private lands.

== Topography ==
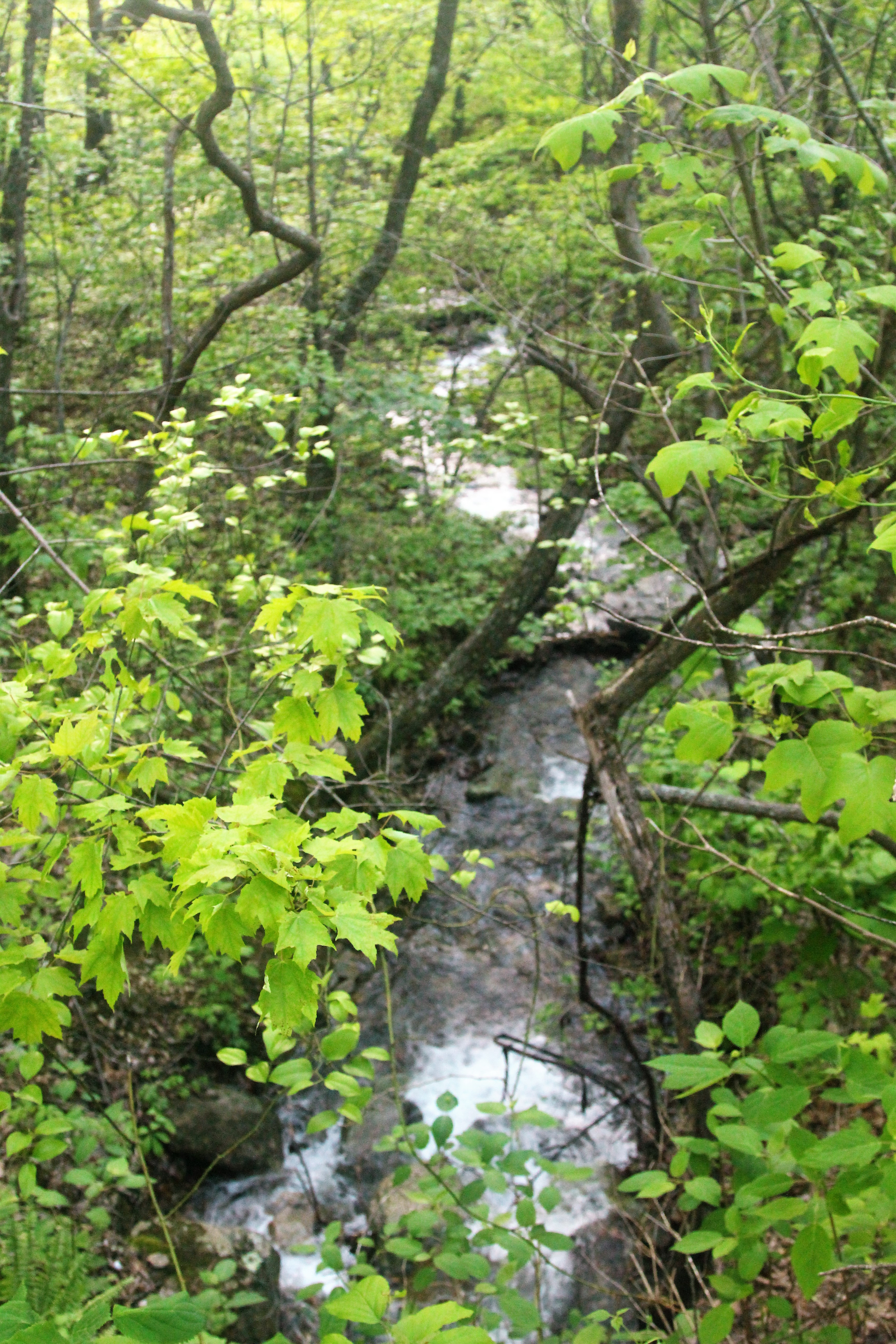
Sulphur Spring

The area is dominated by Thunder Ridge with steep slopes on the northern side, and elevations ranging from 1320 feet in the lowlands of the northwest to 4200 feet on Apple Orchard Mountain.

The peaks are part of the Pedlar Formation, composed of igneous granite and metamorphic gneiss with a mineral content which weathers to give a soil supporting a lush growth of plants. The area has the tallest trees and the finest groups of laurel and rhododendron in the region.

== Cultural history ==
Just south of the wilderness area on Apple Orchard Mountain, Apple Orchard Camp offered overnight accommodations in the early 1900s. In 1924 the camp became Camp Kewanzee, a summer camp for boys and girls. During the Cold War a nearby area was developed as a radar-based tracking station, and in the 1960s a large computer complex was built to process data for transmission to Fort Lee, Virginia. The military base was closed in 1975 leaving a single radar dome and other facilities. The dome, a prominent feature on the tallest mountain along the parkway in Virginia, can be seen from a long distance.

In 1928 during a violent storm, a balloon, participating in an international balloon race, crashed in the night onto Thunder Hill. Major injuries were sustained, especially during the climb down the mountain.

== Nearby Wildlands ==
Nearby wilderness areas and wildlands recognized as one of Virginia's "Mountain Treasures" by the Wilderness Society are:

- James River Face Wilderness
- James River Face Wilderness Addition
- White Oak Ridge-Terrapin Mountain
- North Creek (conservation area)
- Wilson Mountain
- Cove Mountain

== See also ==
- Glenwood Cluster
