= James River Face Wilderness =

Wilderness area in Virginia, United States

- IUCN category Ib (wilderness area)
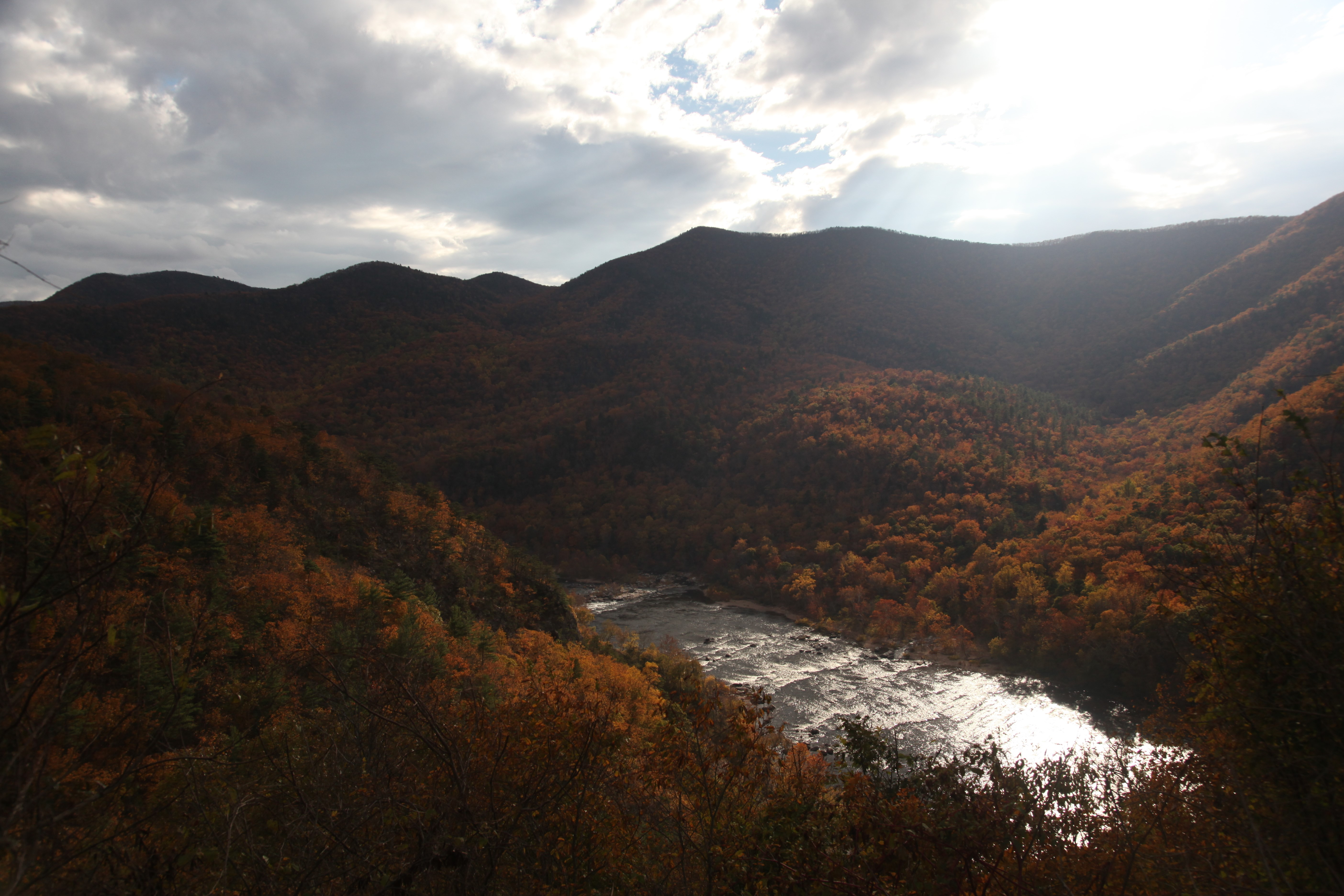
- James River Face, from Va 130 looking southeast

- Location within Virginia
- Location: Bedford, Rockbridge County, Virginia, United States
- Nearest city: Buena Vista, Virginia
- Coordinates: 37.588524°N 79.444885°W
- Area: 8,907 acres (3,605 ha)
- Established: 1975
- Administrator: U.S. Forest Service

The James River Face Wilderness is an 8,907-acre area located near Natural Bridge, Virginia that is protected by the Eastern Wilderness Act of Congress to maintain its present, natural condition. As part of the National Wilderness Preservation System, it helps to preserve a variety of natural life forms and contributes to a diversity of plant and animal gene pools. Over half of the ecosystems in the United States exist within designated wilderness.

The wilderness contains many contrasting features. A short distance separates scorched hillsides, stark rockpiles and dry forest on one side and exceedingly rich vegetation on the crest of the Blue Ridge on the other.

The area is part of the Glenwood Cluster.

== Location and access ==
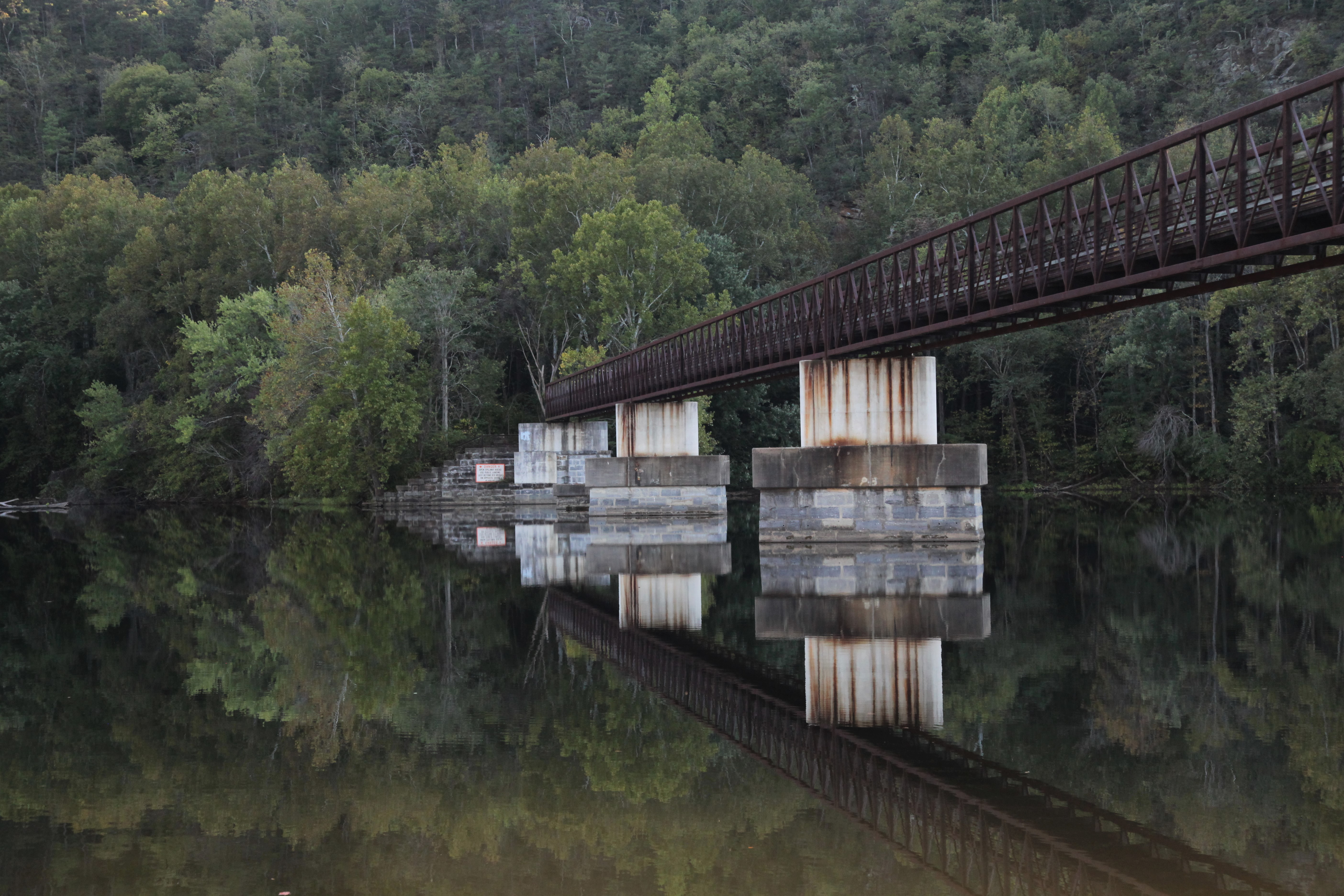
Bridge for Appalachian Trail, crossing the James River, Virginia, fall 2017

James River Face Wilderness is located in the Jefferson National Forest several miles from Natural Bridge Station, Virginia. It is bounded on the northeast by the James River, on the west by Forest Service Road 35, and on the south by the Blue Ridge Parkway.

There are several well maintained trails giving access into the wilderness. Among these are:

- Appalachian Trail, 9.9 miles, 2400 feet elevation change, trailheads on US 130 and FS 35
- Balcony Falls Trail, 4.1 miles, 1850 feet elevation change, trailhead on FS 3093
- Belfast Trail, 2.8 miles, 1700 foot elevation change, trailhead on FS 35
- Gunter Ridge Trail, 5.1 miles, 1560 foot elevation change, trailhead FS 54
- Piney Ridge Trail, 3.5 miles, 1720 foot elevation change, trailhead on FS 54
- Sulphur Springs Trail, 2.7 miles, 1050 foot elevation change, trailhead on FS 35

== Natural history ==
The forest cover includes chestnut oak and various types of yellow pine. Northern red oak and hickories are found near Highcock Knob. The wilderness has sheltered coves with white oak, basswood and tulip poplar. Old growth trees are found in the watershed of Matt’s Creek and along the James River where the Appalachian Trail goes into the drainage of Matt’s Creek.

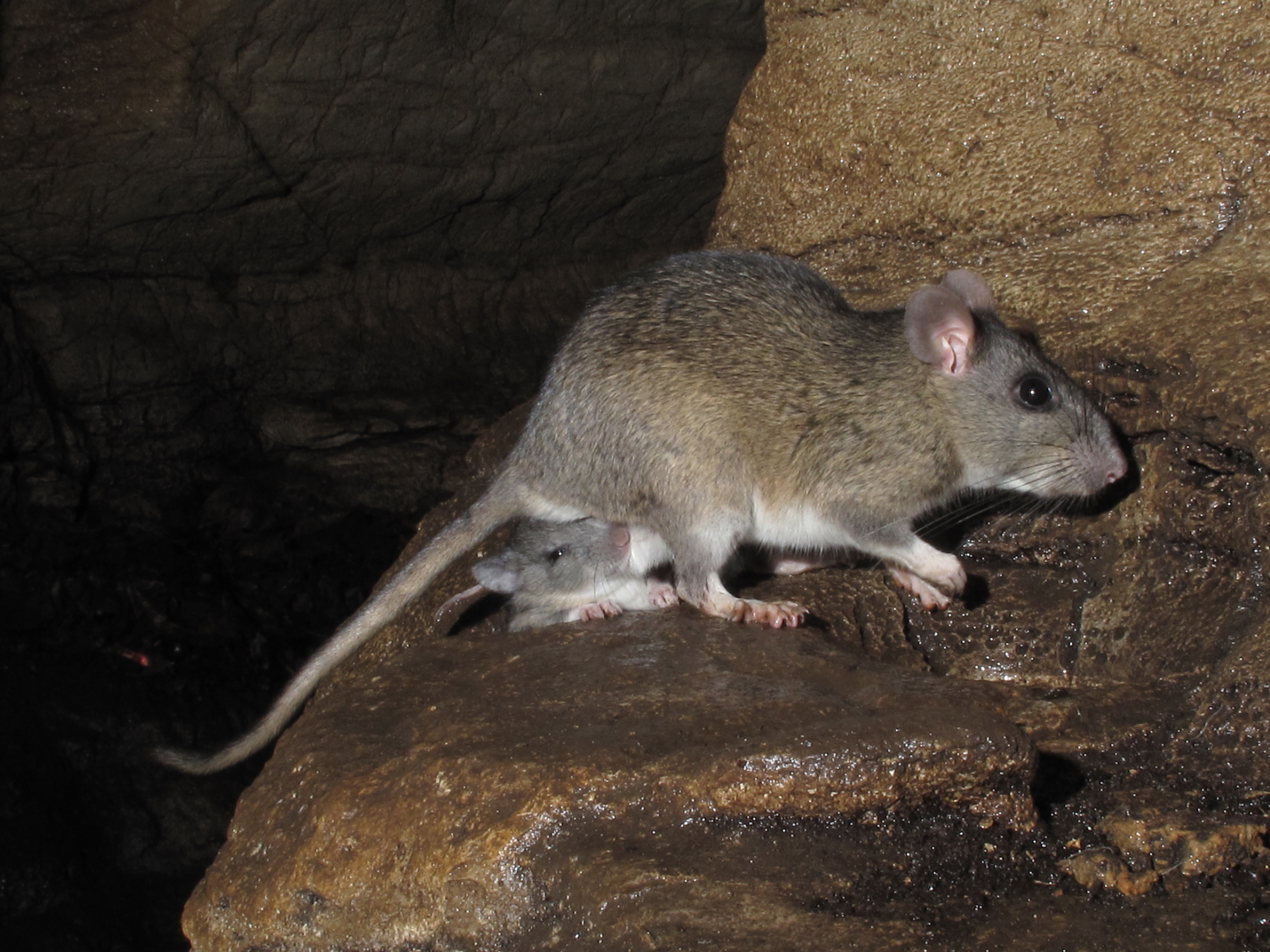
Allegheny Woodrat

The Allegheny woodrat has been observed in the wilderness at the rock outcrops of the Devils Marbleyard. The population of the woodrat is in decline. Among the hypotheses being considered for the decline are the loss of food sources, loss of habitat and mortality from parasites introduced by raccoons.

The lower elevations of the wilderness have a long history of mineral development and logging. The area contains the former Francis T. Anderson's Glenwood Estate, regarded as one of the finest principalities in western Virginia. Anderson operated the Glenwood Iron Furnace, an enterprise that required thousands of acres of timber to produce the charcoal used in the iron furnace. The area was stripped of its timber, and then operators returned to log second and third-growth timber.

== Topography ==
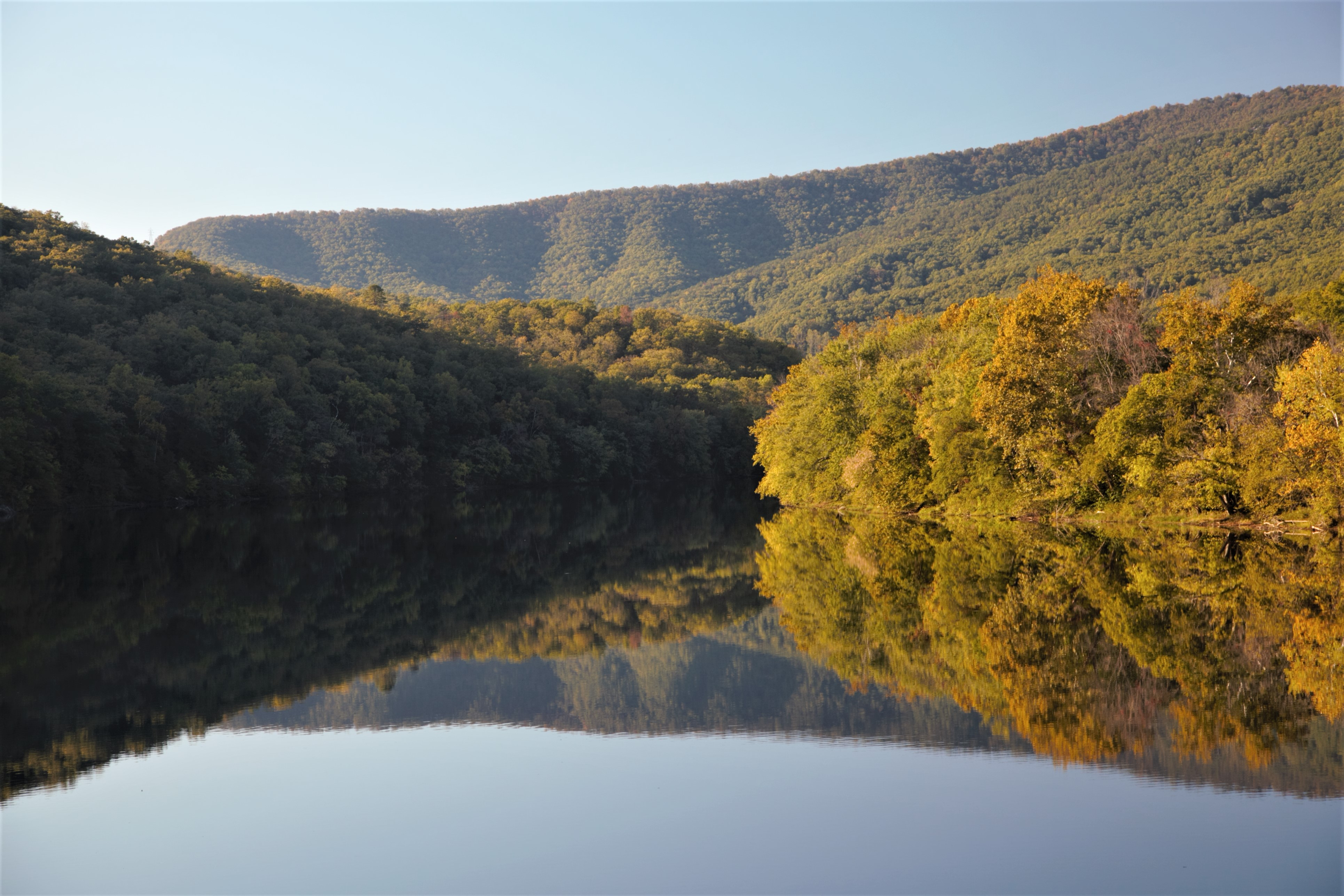
James River from AT bridge looking north, fall 2017

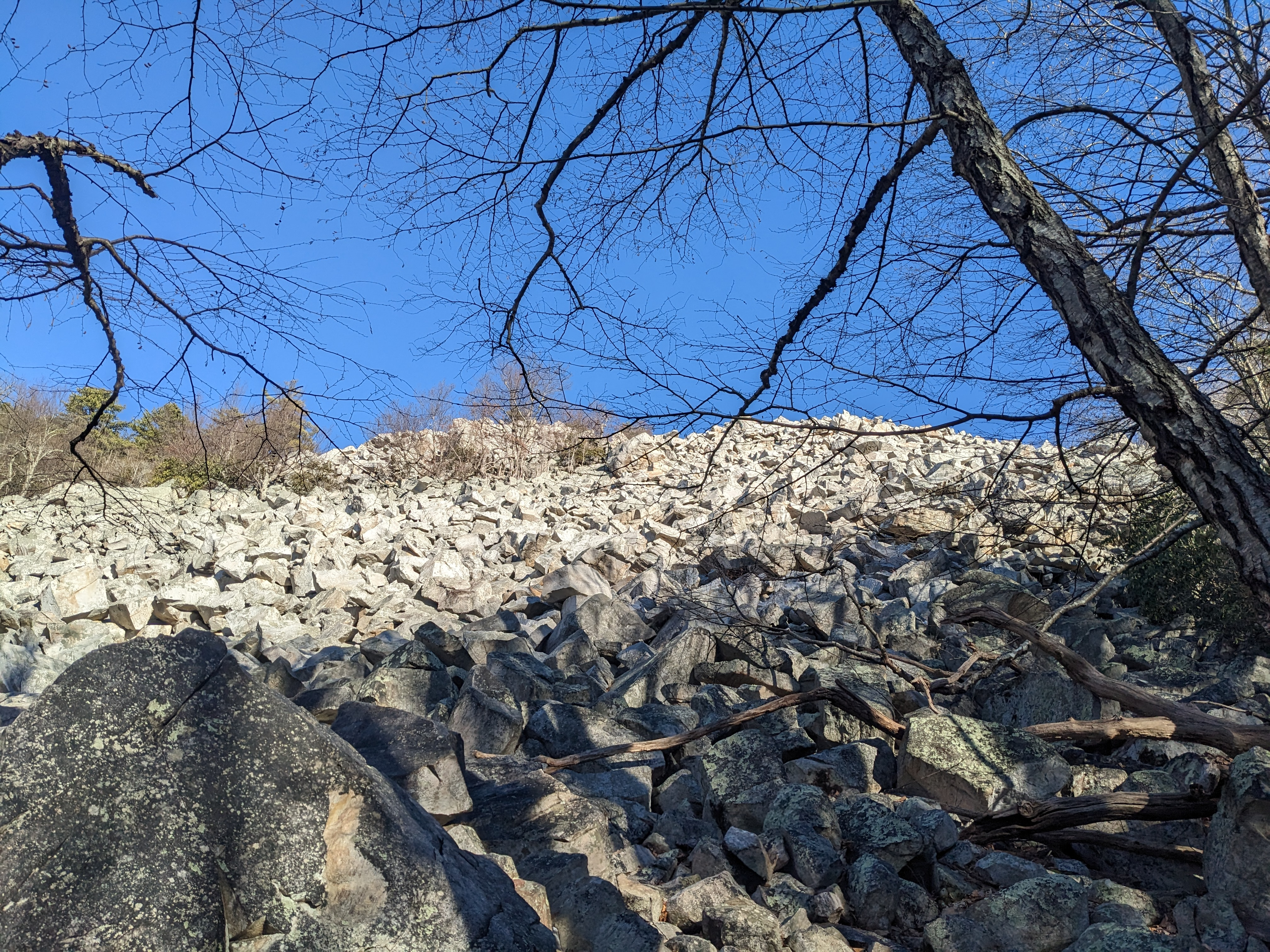
Devil's Marbleyard rock outcrop as seen from the base. The large boulders can be climbed by hikers.

The wilderness has a complex topography with a peak Highcock Knob towering at an elevation of 3100 feet over the James River at 650 feet, a rock outcrop Devils Marbleyard composed of quartzite boulders the size of a schoolbus, many creeks with rapid descents and waterfalls, and the tall ridges Piney Ridge on the east and Gunter Ridge on the west.

== Management ==
This wilderness was designated by congress in 1975 and is managed by the U.S. Forest Service as a part of the Glenwood-Pedlar Ranger Districts of the George Washington & Jefferson National Forests. There are some regulations to maintain the integrity of the area. For example, motorized equipment, motor vehicles and mountain bikes are prohibited, group size is limited to ten people, and limits are placed on camping.

The wilderness is being monitored for clean air, with special concern for visibility, water quality and vegetation. Sulfur compounds produce a haze reducing visibility, an acidification of streams and a leaching of nutrients from the soil, and ozone creates visible injury to plant leaves reducing plant growth. Pollutants are created by many sources over a large geographic region.

== Nearby wildlands ==
Nearby wilderness areas and wildlands recognized as one of Virginia's "Mountain Treasures" by the Wilderness Society are:

- Thunder Ridge Wilderness
- James River Face Wilderness Addition
- White Oak Ridge-Terrapin Mountain
- North Creek (conservation area)
- Wilson Mountain (Virginia)
- Cove Mountain

== See also ==
- Glenwood Cluster
- Wilderness
- Eastern Wilderness Act
- List_of_U.S._Wilderness_Areas
- George Washington and Jefferson National Forests
