= White Oak Ridge-Terrapin Mountain =

Forest lands in western Virginia, US

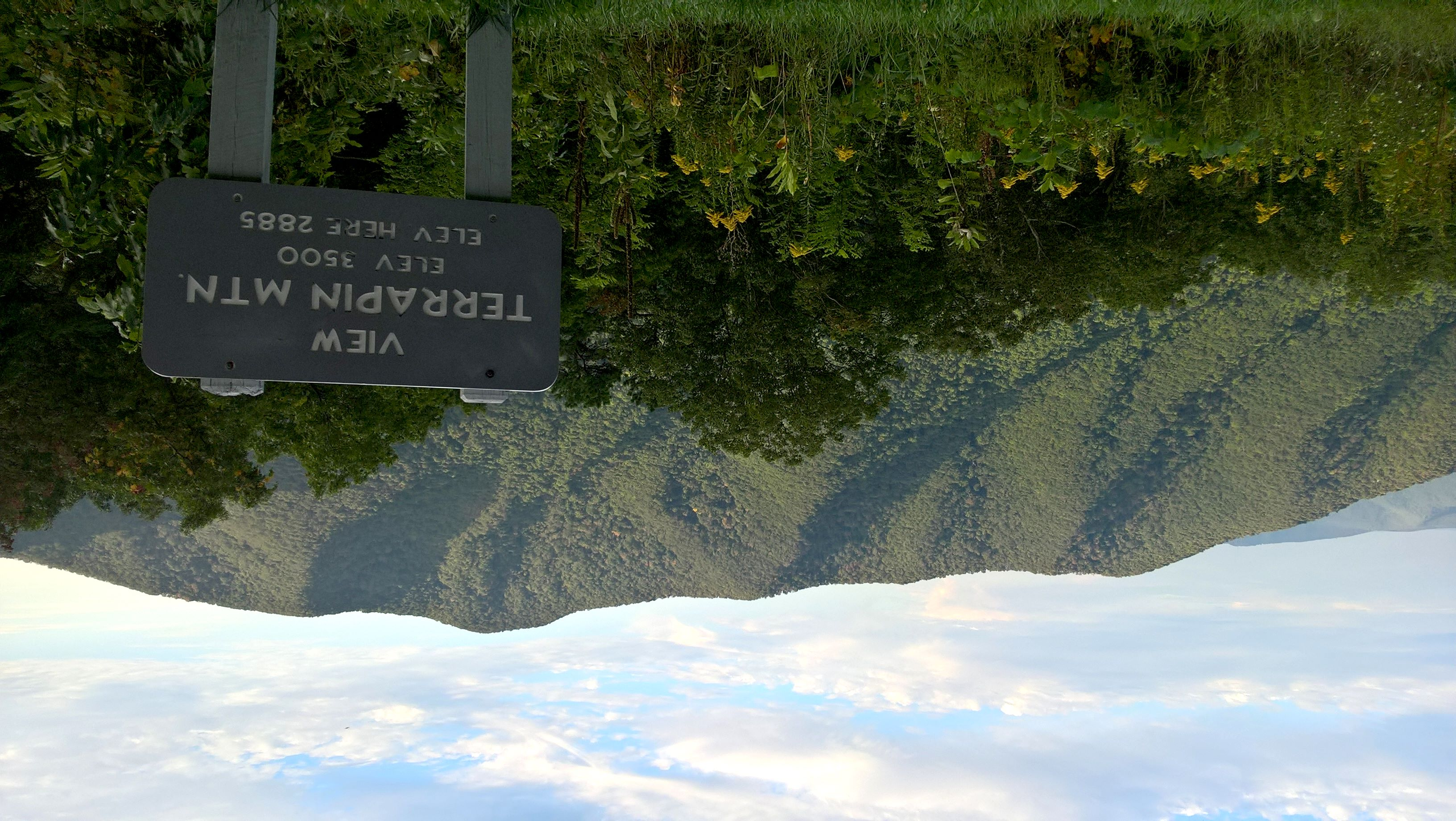
- Terrapin Mountain viewed from the Blue Ridge Parkway

- Location within Virginia
- Location: Glenwood, Virginia, Bedford County, Virginia, Virginia, United States
- Coordinates: 37°31′23″N 79°27′57″W
- Area: 8,000 acres (32 km^{2})

White Oak Ridge-Terrapin Mountain is a wildland in the George Washington and Jefferson National Forests of western Virginia that has been recognized by the Wilderness Society as a special place worthy of protection from logging and road construction. With over 1200 acres of possible old growth forest, this is a rugged area with a rich diversity of geology and plant life.

The area is part of the Glenwood Cluster.

== Location and access ==
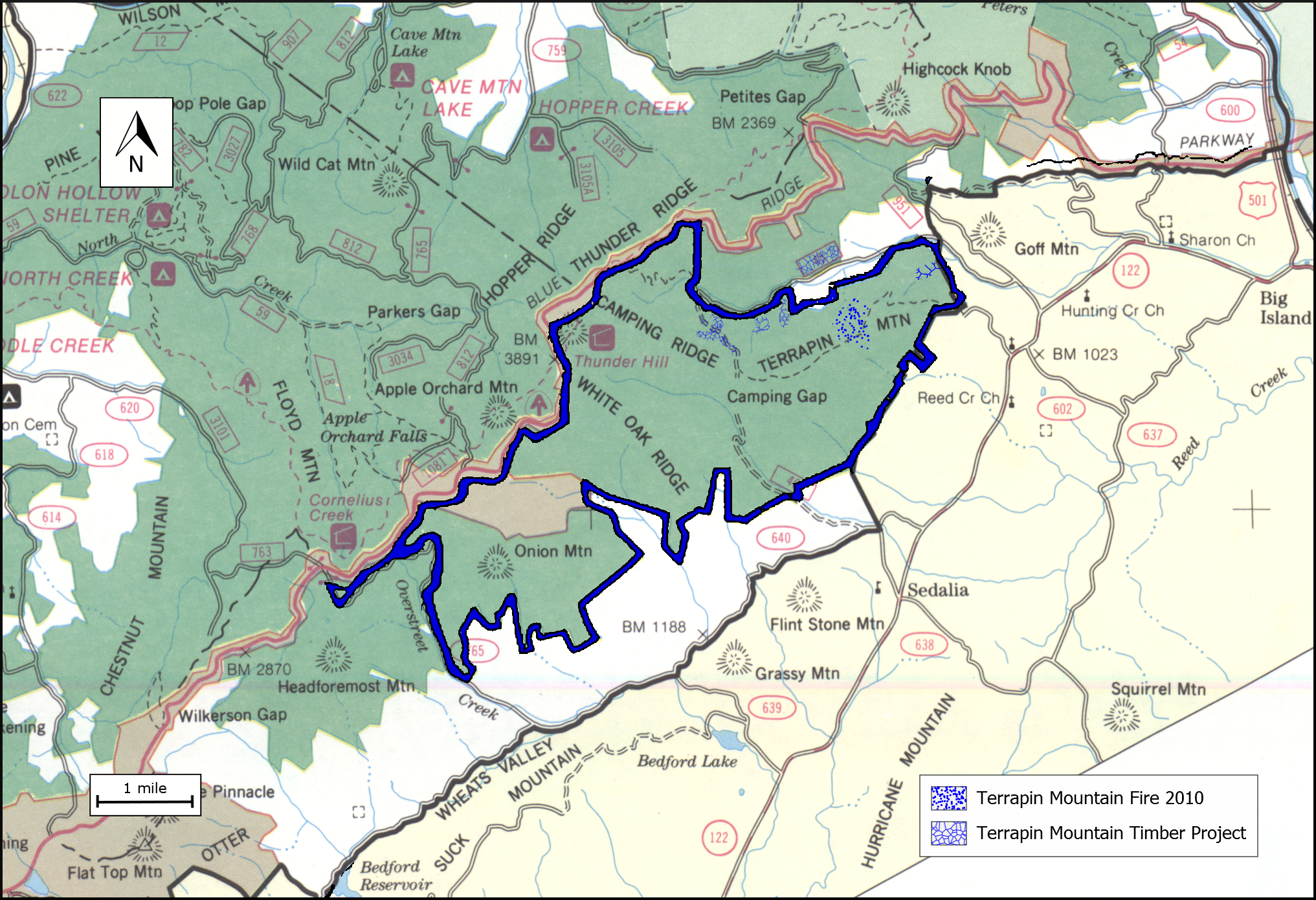
Boundary for the White Oak Ridge-Terrapin Mountain wildland as identified by the Wilderness Society

The area is located in the Appalachian Mountains of Southwestern Virginia about 10 miles south of Glasgow, Virginia. The area is bounded by the Blue Ridge Parkway on the northwest and Va 602 (Hunting Camp Creek Road) on the east. Good access is gained from Va 602.

The Forest Service has issued a document entitled "Motor Vehicle Use Map" dated January 1, 2015. The document is a set of 56 maps covering the George Washington and Jefferson National Forest. The maps show roads and trails in the forest and gives the type of vehicle allowed on each route with possible seasonal restrictions. The map covering the White Oak Ridge-Terrapin Mountain area is included in the gallery below.

Trails into the area include

- Appalachian Trail (Thunder Hill Section), 1.3 mile section in wildland includes Thunder Hill Shelter.
- Terrapin Mountain Trail, FS Trail 5, 3.0 miles, moderate difficulty, yellow blazed,
- Hunting Creek Trail, FS Trail 31.0 miles, moderate difficulty, blue blazed
- Glenwood Horse Trail, FS Trail 3004, 65.0 miles includes section in the wildland, moderate difficulty, orange blazed

The boundary of the wildland as determined by the Wilderness Society is shown in the adjacent map. Additional roads and trails are given on National Geographic Map 789. A great variety of information, including topographic maps, aerial views, satellite data and weather information, is obtained by selecting the link with the wildland's coordinates in the upper right of this page. Beyond maintained trails, old logging roads can be used to explore the area. The Appalachian Mountains were extensively timbered in the early twentieth century leaving logging roads that are becoming overgrown but still passable., Old logging roads and railroad grades can be located by consulting the historical topographic maps available from the United States Geological Survey (USGS). The White Oak Ridge-Terrapin Mountain wildland is covered by USGS topographic maps Snowden, Arnold Valley, Sedalia, and Peaks of Otter. A key to the topographic maps for the northern half of the Jefferson National Forest is in the gallery below.

== Natural history ==
The habitat of the southern Appalachians is rich in its biological diversity with nearly 10,000 species, some not found anywhere else. The great diversity is related to the many ridges and valleys which form isolated communities in which species evolve separately from one another. The region lies south of the glaciers that covered North America 11,000 years go. To escape the glaciers, northern species retreated south to find refuge in the southern Appalachians. When the glaciers retreated, many of these species remained along with the southern species that were native to the area. The diversity includes trees, mosses, millipedes and salamanders.

The wildland contains parts of two special biological areas, Apple Orchard Mountain and Camping Ridge. Special biological areas have large biological diversity with rare fauna and significant forest communities.

There is a small track of old growth forest near Camping Ridge, and large tracts on and east of Onion Mountain. Much of the northern side of Terrapin Mountain and Camping Ridge between Camping Gap and the Thunder Ridge Shelter are at least 140 years old.

The deep forests offer habitat for black bear, salamanders, trout, and other species dependent on this habitat.

Wild natural trout streams in Virginia are classified by the Department of Game and Inland Fisheries by their water quality, with class i the highest and class iv the lowest. Hunting Creek is ranked as a class ii trout stream.

== Topography ==
The wildland is in the Blue Ridge Mountains, a province of the Appalachian Mountains. The area, dominated by Terrapin Mountain at an elevation of 3506 feet and Onion Mountain with an elevation of 3812 feet, contains large scree slopes and boulders as large as buildings. Rising from the Piedmont, the area has a 2800-foot elevation change as it ascends to the mountain crests.

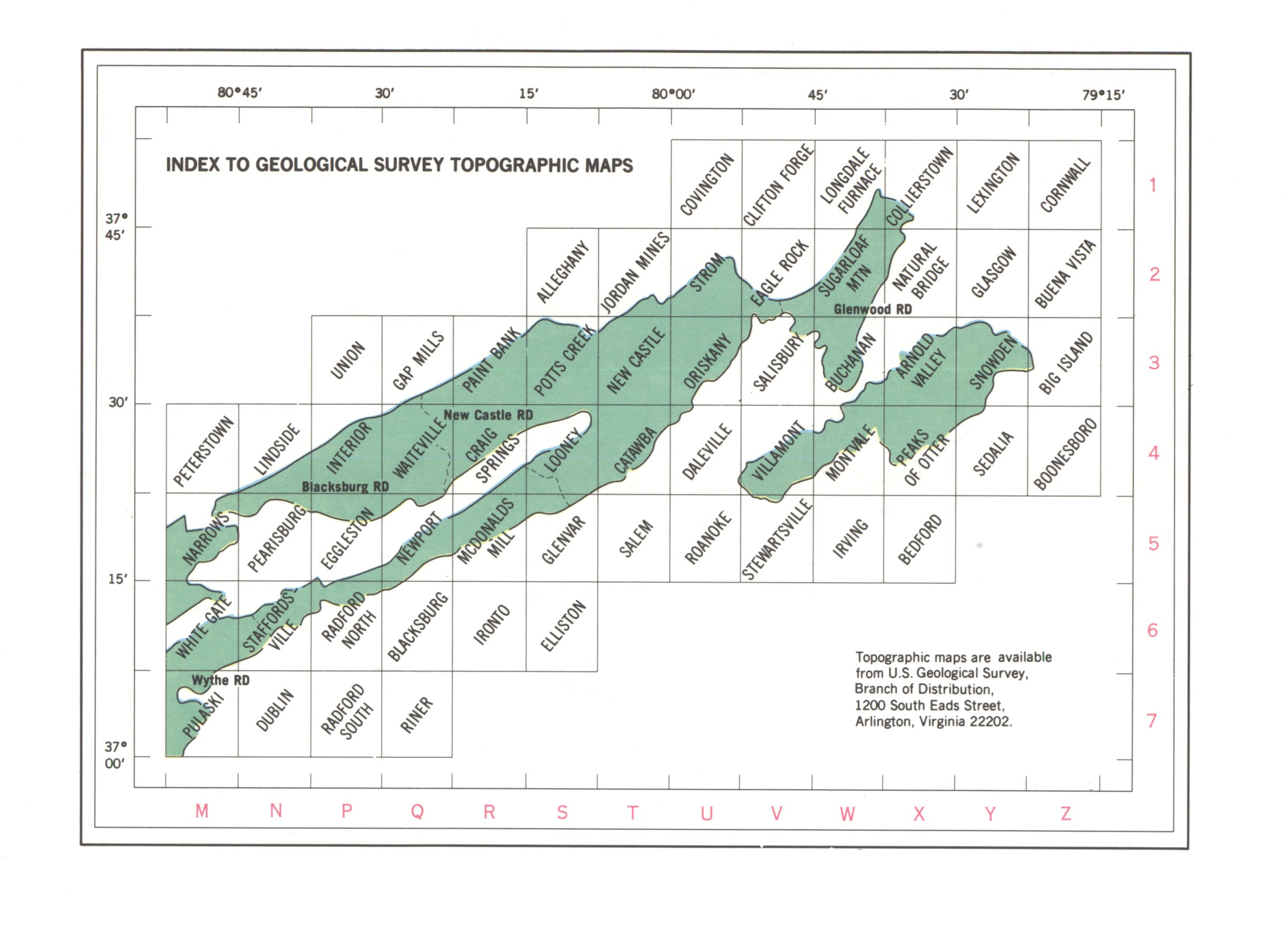
Index to topographic maps covering the northern section of the Jefferson National Forest

Motor Vehicle Use Map31 for White Oak Ridge-Terrapin Mountain wildland

== Forest Service management ==
The Forest Service has conducted a survey of their lands to determine their potential for wilderness designation. Wilderness designation provides a high degree of protection from development. The areas that were found suitable are referred to as inventoried roadless areas. Later a Roadless Rule was adopted that limited road construction in these areas. The rule provided some degree of protection by reducing the negative environmental impact of road construction and thus promoting the conservation of roadless areas. The White Oak Ridge-Terrapin Mountain wildland was not included in the inventoried roadless areas, and therefore not protected from possible road construction and timber sales.

To stop illegal motorized use, in 2010 the Forest Service blocked access to hill climbs in the area around Overstreet Creek. Two small areas on both sides of the ridge near the summit of Terrapin Mountain were burned in the Terrapin Mountain Fire of April 2010.

== Nearby Wildlands ==
Nearby wilderness areas and wildlands recognized as one of Virginia's "Mountain Treasures" by the Wilderness Society are:

- James River Face Wilderness
- Thunder Ridge Wilderness
- James River Face Wilderness Addition
- North Creek (conservation area)
- Wilson Mountain
- Cove Mountain
