= Wilson Mountain (Virginia) =

Protected area in Virginia, United States

- IUCN category VI (protected area with sustainable use of natural resources)
- Location within Virginia
- Location: Glenwood, Jefferson National Forest, Virginia, Virginia, United States
- Coordinates: 37°34′18″N 79°34′51″W
- Area: 5,194 acres (21.02 km^{2})

Wilson Mountain is a wildland in the George Washington and Jefferson National Forests of western Virginia that has been recognized by the Wilderness Society as a special place worthy of protection from logging and road construction.

Entering this wildland, one is in a world of solitude with a great canopy of forest. It has rarely used, primitive campsites sprinkled along streams and a ravine with a "great view" that gives no evidence of man's activities.

The area is part of the Glenwood Cluster.

== Location and access ==
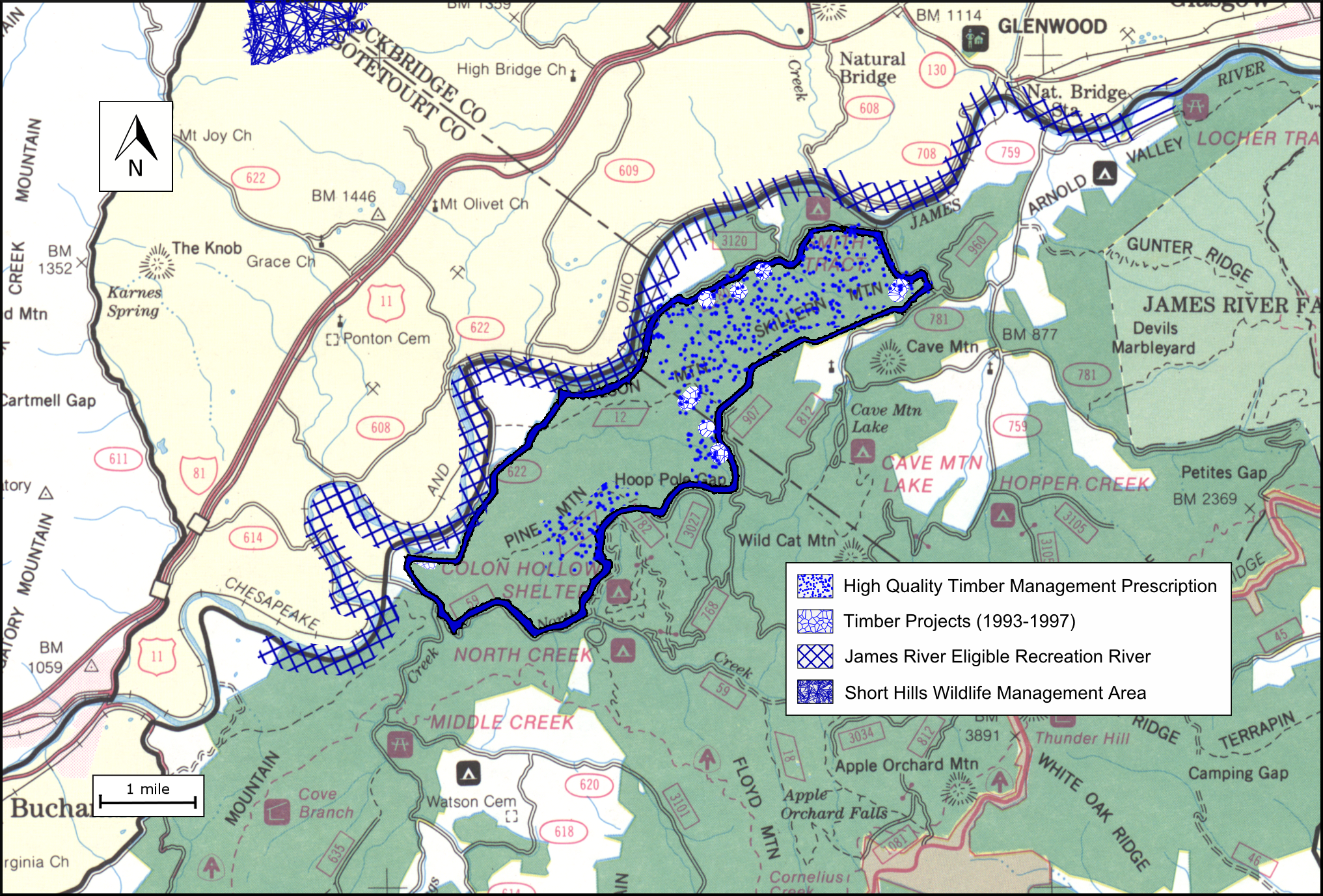
Boundary of the Wilson Mountain wildland of the Jefferson National Forest as identified by the Wilderness Society.

The area is located in the Appalachian Mountains of Southwestern Virginia about 10 miles northeast of Buchanan, Virginia, between the James River on the west, SR 780 on the northeast, and North Creek Road (FS 59) on the south.

The Forest Service 2015 Motor Vehicle Use Map shows roads and trails in the forest and gives the type of vehicle allowed on each route with possible seasonal restrictions. The map covering Wilson Mountain area (Map 31) is included in the gallery below. Caution should be taken when using forest service road numbers since they are not consistent in different maps of the area.

Trails and roads into the area include:

- The Wilson Mountain Trail, FS 12, 3.0 miles, moderate, blue-blazed.
- Sprouts Run National Recreation Trail, FS 3003, 3.3 miles, moderate, yellow-blazed.
- Skillen Mountain Road (Rt 316), 1.7 miles with an additional 0.3 miles seasonally restricted
- Gilmore Hollow A Road (Rt 280-A), 0.7 miles.
- Pine Ridge Trail

The boundary of the wildland as determined by the Wilderness Society is shown in the adjacent map. Additional roads and trails are given on National Geographic Map 789. A great variety of information, including topographic maps, aerial views, satellite data and weather information, is obtained by selecting the link with the wildland's coordinates in the upper right of this page. Beyond maintained trails, old logging roads can be used to explore the area. The Appalachian Mountains were extensively timbered in the early twentieth century leaving logging roads that are becoming overgrown but still passable., Old logging roads and railroad grades can be located by consulting the historical topographic maps available from the United States Geological Survey (USGS). The James River Face Wilderness Addition is covered by USGS topographic map Arnold Valley. A key to the topographic maps for the northern half of the Jefferson National Forest is in the gallery below.

== Natural history ==
The habitat of the southern Appalachians is rich in its biological diversity with nearly 10,000 species, some not found anywhere else. The great diversity is related to the many ridges and valleys which form isolated communities in which species evolve separately from one another. The region lies south of the glaciers that covered North America 11,000 years go. To escape the glaciers, northern species retreated south to find refuge in the southern Appalachians. When the glaciers retreated, many of these species remained along with the southern species that were native to the area. The diversity includes trees, mosses, millipedes and salamanders.

The Natural Heritage Program has identified three special biological areas in this wildland: the North Creek Woodland, Jennings Creek Shale Barren and Sprouts Run. These sites contain shale barrens with a unique collection of plants. Compared to the Ridge and Valley Province to the west, the Blue Ridge Mountains have few shale barrens.

There is a tract of forest close the ridgeline of Pine Mountain with trees older than 140 years. Water thrushes are found in a small wetland on the northwestern edge of the area. The area also contains unusual plants such as the Virginia white-haired leatherflower, the Virginia false-gromwell, crested coral root and the Biltmore form of white ash.

Hemlock beech forests are found along Sprouts Run.

== Topography ==
Wilson Mountain, a long ridge facing the James River with a 2044 feet elevation, is composed of quartzite and metasiltstone. This ridge is just south of the section of James River that forms the boundary between two physiographic provinces, the Blue Ridge and the Ridge and Valley. Whereas the Blue Ridge Mountains are composed mostly of granitic/metamorphic rock, the Ridge and Valley is composed of sedimentary, folded rock. Thus the area forms a habitat linkage between the two provinces.

Other peaks in the area include Pine Ridge (2172 feet) and Thomas Mountain (2231 feet).

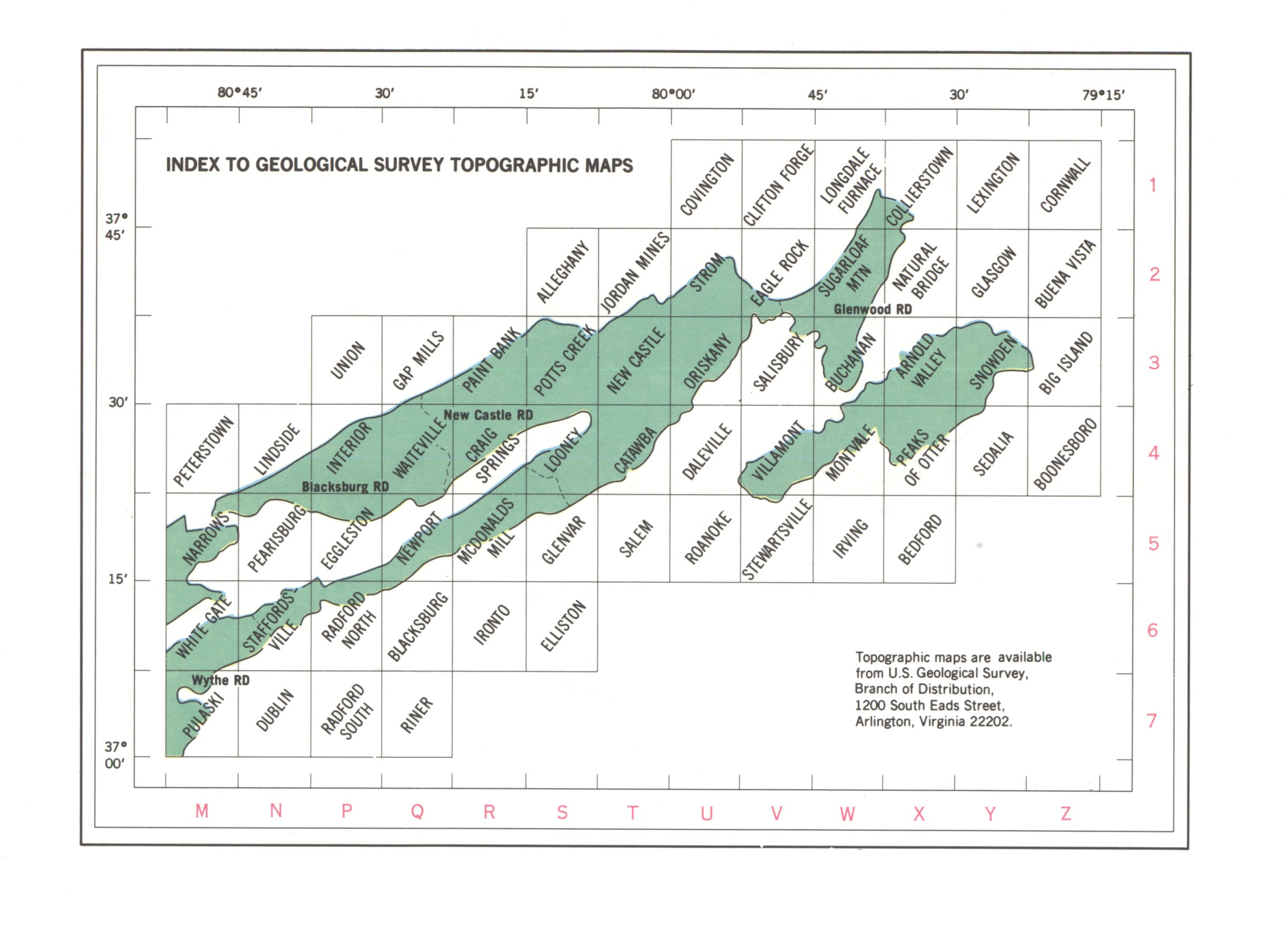
Index to topographic maps covering the northern section of the Jefferson National Forest

Motor Vehicle Use Map 31

== Forest Service management ==
The Forest Service has conducted a survey of their lands to determine the potential for wilderness designation. Wilderness designation provides a high degree of protection from development. The areas that were found suitable are referred to as inventoried roadless areas. Later a Roadless Rule was adopted that limited road construction in these areas. The rule provided some degree of protection by reducing the negative environmental impact of road construction and thus promoting the conservation of roadless areas. The area was not inventoried in the roadless area review, and therefore not protected from possible road construction and timber sales.

The Gilmore Hollow timber project was approved in 1993, and the 196 acre Wilson Mountain timber project was approved in 1997.

About half of the wildland is in a forest service prescription that allows up to 16% of the area to be logged in order to create early successional habitat A large part of the remaining area is designated as "Dispersed Recreation-Suitable" which also allows logging.

In 2001, the Skillern Mountain fire burned parts of the eastern end of the wildland.

== Nearby Wildlands ==
Nearby wilderness areas and wildlands recognized as one of Virginia's "Mountain Treasures" by the Wilderness Society are:

- James River Face Wilderness
- Thunder Ridge Wilderness
- James River Face Wilderness Addition
- White Oak Ridge-Terrapin Mountain
- North Creek (conservation area)
- Cove Mountain
