= Cove Mountain (conservation area) =

Wildland in Virginia, United States

- IUCN category VI (protected area with sustainable use of natural resources)
- Location within Virginia
- Location: Glenwood, Virginia, Botetourt County, Virginia, Virginia, United States
- Coordinates: 37°29′37″N 79°39′7″W
- Area: 4,490 acres (18.2 km^{2})

Cove Mountain is a wildland in the George Washington and Jefferson National Forests of western Virginia that has been recognized by the Wilderness Society as a special place worthy of protection from logging and road construction.

The wild area includes a seven-mile section of the Appalachian Trail with four miles following along Cove Mountain ridge. There are excellent winter views of Flat Top Mountain, Sharp Top and Peaks of Otter to the east. The area contains the headwaters of prime trout fisheries.

The area is part of the Glenwood Cluster.

== Location and access ==
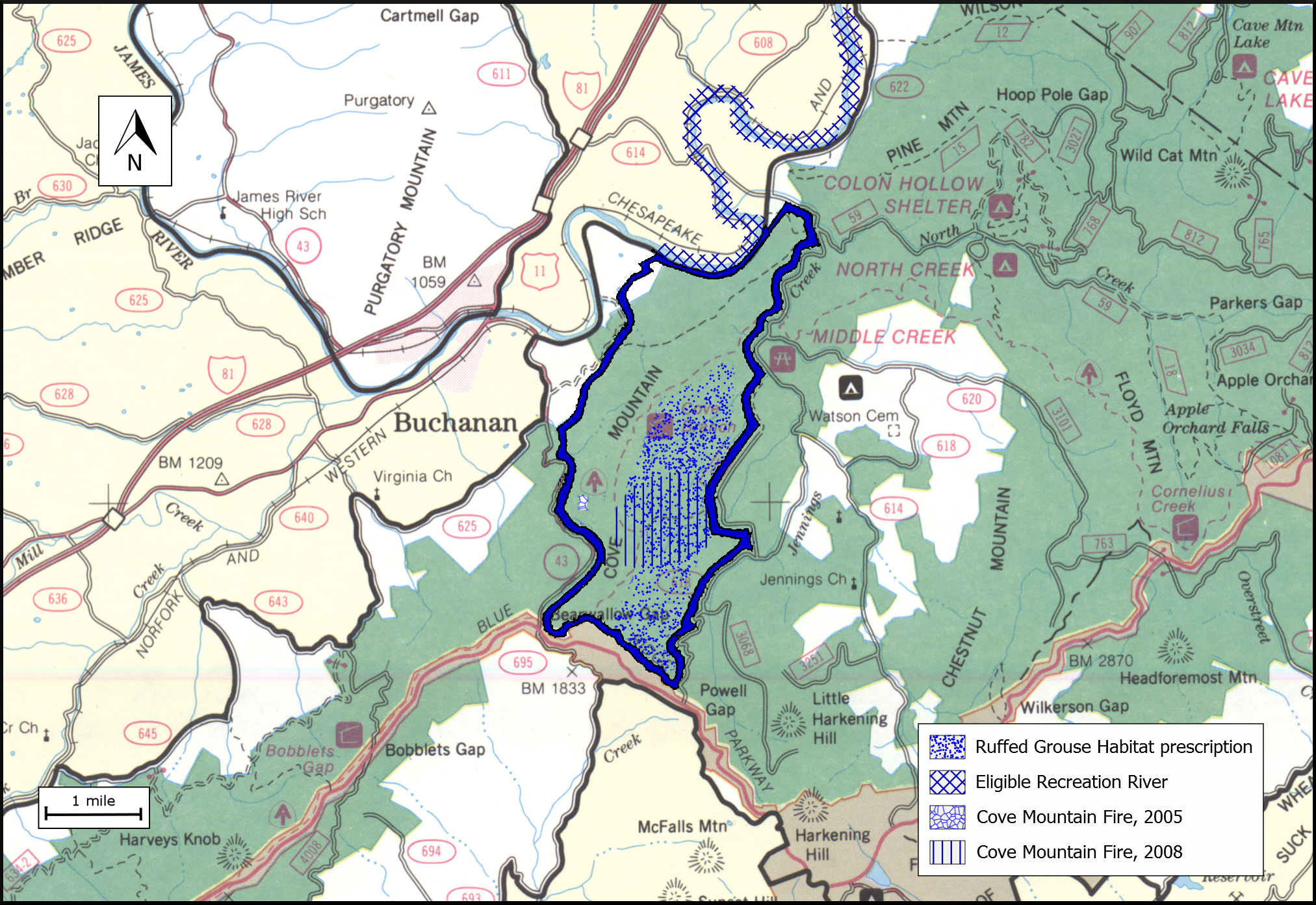
Boundary of the Cove Mountain wildland in the Jefferson National Forest as identified by the Wilderness Society.

The area is located in the Appalachian Mountains of Southwestern Virginia about 4 miles east of Buchanan, Virginia, between the James River on the north, Va 43 on the west, the Blue Ridge Parkway on the south and McFalls Creek Rd (Va 618) on the east.

The Forest Service 2015 Motor Vehicle Use Map shows roads and trails in the forest and gives the type of vehicle allowed on each route with possible seasonal restrictions. The maps covering Cove Mountain area (Maps 31 and 32) are included in the gallery below. Caution should be taken when using forest service road numbers since they are not consistent in different maps of the area.

Trails and roads into the area include:

- Appalachian Trail, 6.6 mil section in wild area, white_blazed
- Buchanan Trail, 1.1 miles
- a section of the Little Cove Mountain Trail, FS trail 25, 2.8 miles total length, moderate difficulty, blue-blazed.
- a section of the Glenwood Horse Trail, FS trail 3004, 65 miles total length, moderate. orange-blazed
- Bearwallow Creek Road, Rt. 3055
- Stillhouse Branch Rd, Rt 3053

The Cove Mountain Shelter is on the AT about 3 miles from the trail's crossing of Jennings Creek.

The boundary of the wildland as determined by the Wilderness Society is shown in the adjacent map. Additional roads and trails are given on National Geographic Map 789. A great variety of information, including topographic maps, aerial views, satellite data and weather information, is obtained by selecting the link with the wildland's coordinates in the upper right of this page.

Beyond maintained trails, old logging roads can be used to explore the area. The Appalachian Mountains were extensively timbered in the early twentieth century leaving logging roads that are becoming overgrown but still passable., Old logging roads and railroad grades can be located by consulting the historical topographic maps available from the United States Geological Survey (USGS). The Cove Mountain wild area is covered by USGS topographic maps Arnold Valley, Buchannan and Montvale. A key to the topographic maps for the northern half of the Jefferson National Forest is in the gallery below.

== Natural history ==
The habitat of the southern Appalachians is rich in its biological diversity with nearly 10,000 species, some not found anywhere else. The great diversity is related to the many ridges and valleys which form isolated communities in which species evolve separately from one another. The region lies south of the glaciers that covered North America 11,000 years go. To escape the glaciers, northern species retreated south to find refuge in the southern Appalachians. When the glaciers retreated, many of these species remained along with the southern species that were native to the area. The diversity includes trees, mosses, millipedes and salamanders.

According to historians, Bearwallow gap, at the intersection of Va 43 and the Blue Ridge Parkway, was an important path for Buffalo crossing the Blue Ridge Mountain. Until the mid-1700s, buffalo were plentiful in Virginia. There has been a road crossing the gap since the late eighteenth century. McFall's Creek special biological area, on the southeast side of the wild area, contains rare plants such as the orchid nodding pogonia.

Invasive plants, such as tree of heaven, Paulownia and autumn olive, are a problem in open areas with roads. clearcuts and game openings.

There are several tracts of old growth forest, one near the Appalachian Trail on the south end of the area near Little Cove Mountain Trail, and others to the north and south near the Appalachian Trail. A one-mile long tract on the northeast has trees at least 140 years old.

Wild natural trout streams in Virginia are classified by the Department of Game and Inland Fisheries by their water quality, with class i the highest and class iv the lowest. Peters Creek, McFalls Creek, Yellowstone Branch and McCoglin Branch are ranked as a class ii trout streams.

In 2008, large woody debris enhancement projects in McCoglin Branch and Yellowstone Branch were designed to improve stream habitat for trout and other species by creating small pools that provide habitat for fish. The debris collects organisms for the fish to eat, and protects the streams from erosion during floods.

== Topography ==
Cove Mountain (elevation 2684 feet) is a spur of the Blue Ridge, stretching from the James River to the Blue Ridge Parkway at Bearwallow Gap.

Bearwallow Creek and Jennings Creek, with many tributaries, are the principal drainages of the area.

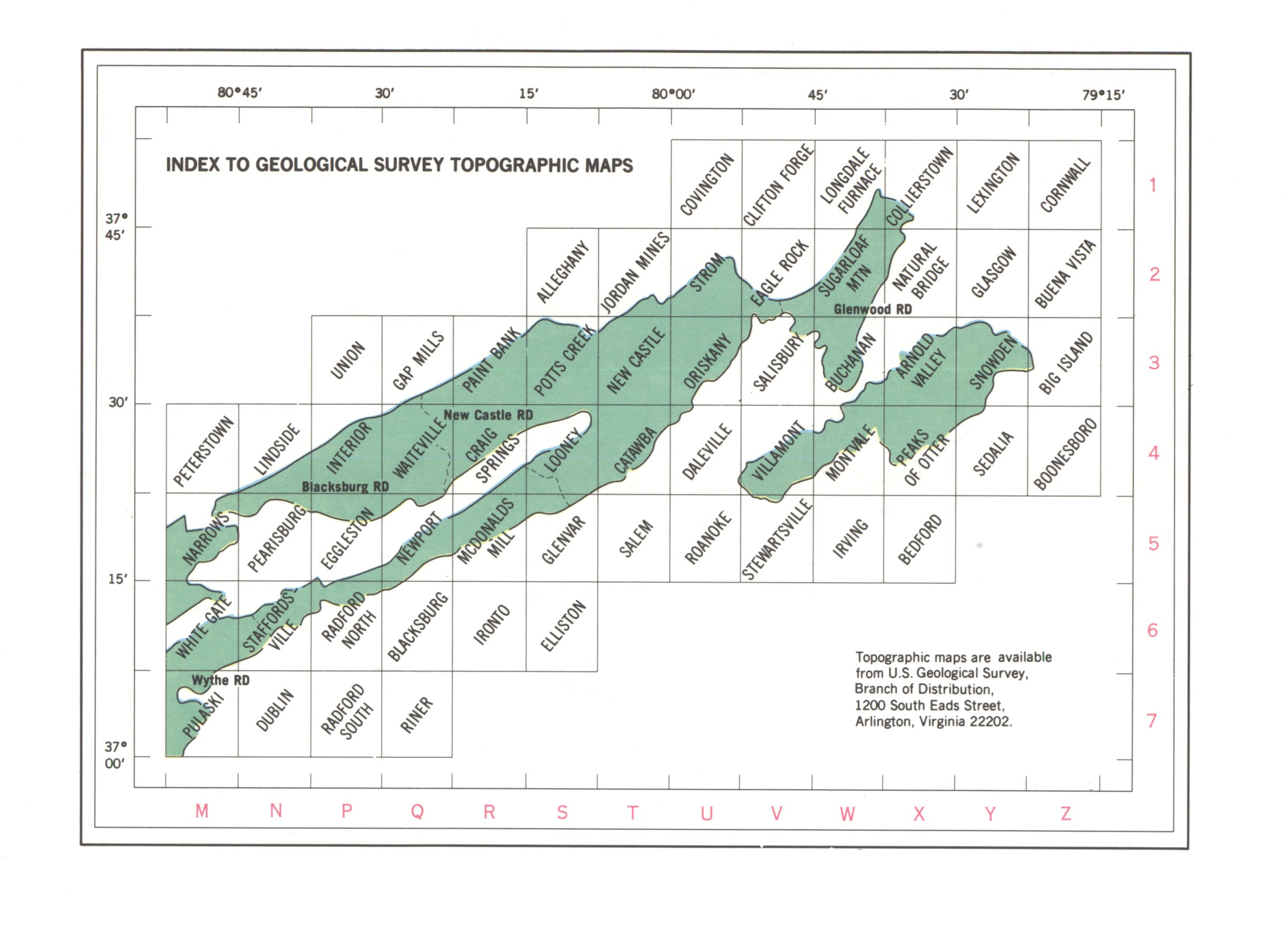
Index to topographic maps covering the northern section of the Jefferson National Forest

Motor Vehicle Use Map 31

Map32, from USFS Motor Vehicle Use Map 2015 collection

== Forest Service management ==
The Forest Service has conducted a survey of their lands to determine the potential for wilderness designation. Wilderness designation provides a high degree of protection from development. The areas that were found suitable are referred to as inventoried roadless areas. Later a Roadless Rule was adopted that limited road construction in these areas. The rule provided some degree of protection by reducing the negative environmental impact of road construction and thus promoting the conservation of roadless areas. The area was not inventoried in the roadless area review, and therefore not protected from possible road construction and timber sales.

In 1930 a forest fire burned 10,000 acres from the Peaks of Otter to Cove Mountain and down the length of Cove Mountain to within a half mile of Arcadia. There was a wildfire in 2005 near Va 43 and Bearwallow Creek, and in 2008 a wildfire in the Little Cove Creek watershed almost reached Va 43. A bulldozed fire line was constructed south of McFalls Ridge and another across Cove Mountain, near the Cove Mountain Shelter and south of the Buchanan Trail.

The Appalachian Trail Corridor and old growth tracts are protected from timber cutting. The forest plan for the area includes Ruffed Grouse Habitat, where timber cutting and road building are allowed, and mixed successional habitat which allows logging.

== Nearby Wildlands ==
Nearby wilderness areas, and wildlands recognized as one of Virginia's "Mountain Treasures" by the Wilderness Society are:

- James River Face Wilderness
- Thunder Ridge Wilderness
- James River Face Wilderness Addition
- White Oak Ridge-Terrapin Mountain
- North Creek (conservation area)
- Wilson Mountain
