= James River Face Wilderness Addition =

Protected area in Bedford County, Virginia

- Location within Virginia
- Location: Glenwood, Virginia, Bedford, Virginia, Virginia, United States
- Coordinates: 37°34′30″N 79°24′8″W
- Area: 1,140 acres (4.6 km^{2})

James River Face Wilderness Addition is a wildland in the George Washington and Jefferson National Forests of western Virginia that has been recognized by the Wilderness Society as a special place worthy of protection from logging and road construction. Adjacent to the James River Face Wilderness, it extends the wildland opportunities of the wilderness on the east to the Jefferson National Forest boundary. The area, managed for bear, has hardwood forests with ages between 60 and almost 100 years.

The area is part of the Glenwood Cluster.

== Location and access ==
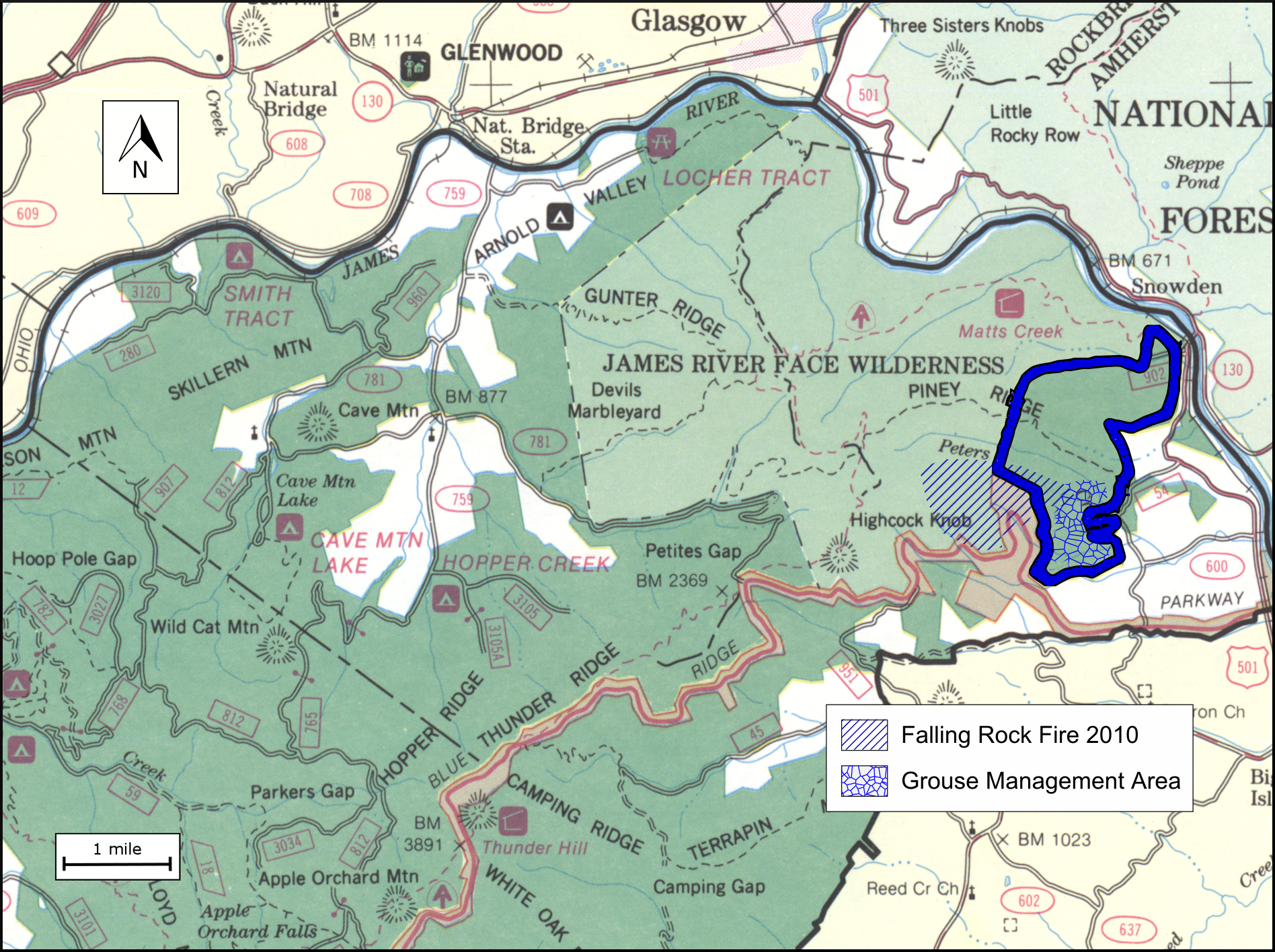
Boundary of the James River Face Wilderness Addition wildland in the Jefferson National Forest as identified by the Wilderness Society.

The area is located in the Appalachian Mountains of Southwestern Virginia about 6 miles south of Glasgow, Virginia, between the James River Wilderness on the west, the Blue Ridge Parkway on the east, and Hunt Club Road (FS 54) on the southwest.

The Forest Service 2015 Motor Vehicle Use Map shows roads and trails in the forest and gives the type of vehicle allowed on each route with possible seasonal restrictions. The map covering the James River Face Wilderness Addition (Map 30) is included in the gallery below.

Trails and roads into the area include:

- The Piney Ridge Trail, FS Trail 2, 3,5 miles, moderate difficulty, blue-blazed. The trail starts at an elevation of 840 feet at the trailhead on FS road 54, then climbs to an elevation of near 2800 feet at the boundary with the James River Face Wilderness. The trail then enters the James River Face Wilderness and connects with the Appalachian Trail
- Peters Creek Spur, FS 54A
- Other roads are shown on the Motor Vehicle Use Map in the gallery below.

The boundary of the wildland as determined by the Wilderness Society is shown in the adjacent map. Additional roads and trails are given on National Geographic Map 789. A great variety of information, including topographic maps, aerial views, satellite data and weather information, is obtained by selecting the link with the wildland's coordinates in the upper right of this page.

Beyond maintained trails, old logging roads can be used to explore the area. The Appalachian Mountains were extensively timbered in the early twentieth century leaving logging roads that are becoming overgrown but still passable., Old logging roads and railroad grades can be located by consulting the historical topographic maps available from the United States Geological Survey (USGS). The James River Face Wilderness Addition is covered by USGS topographic map Snowden. A key to the topographic maps for the northern half of the Jefferson National Forest is in the gallery below.

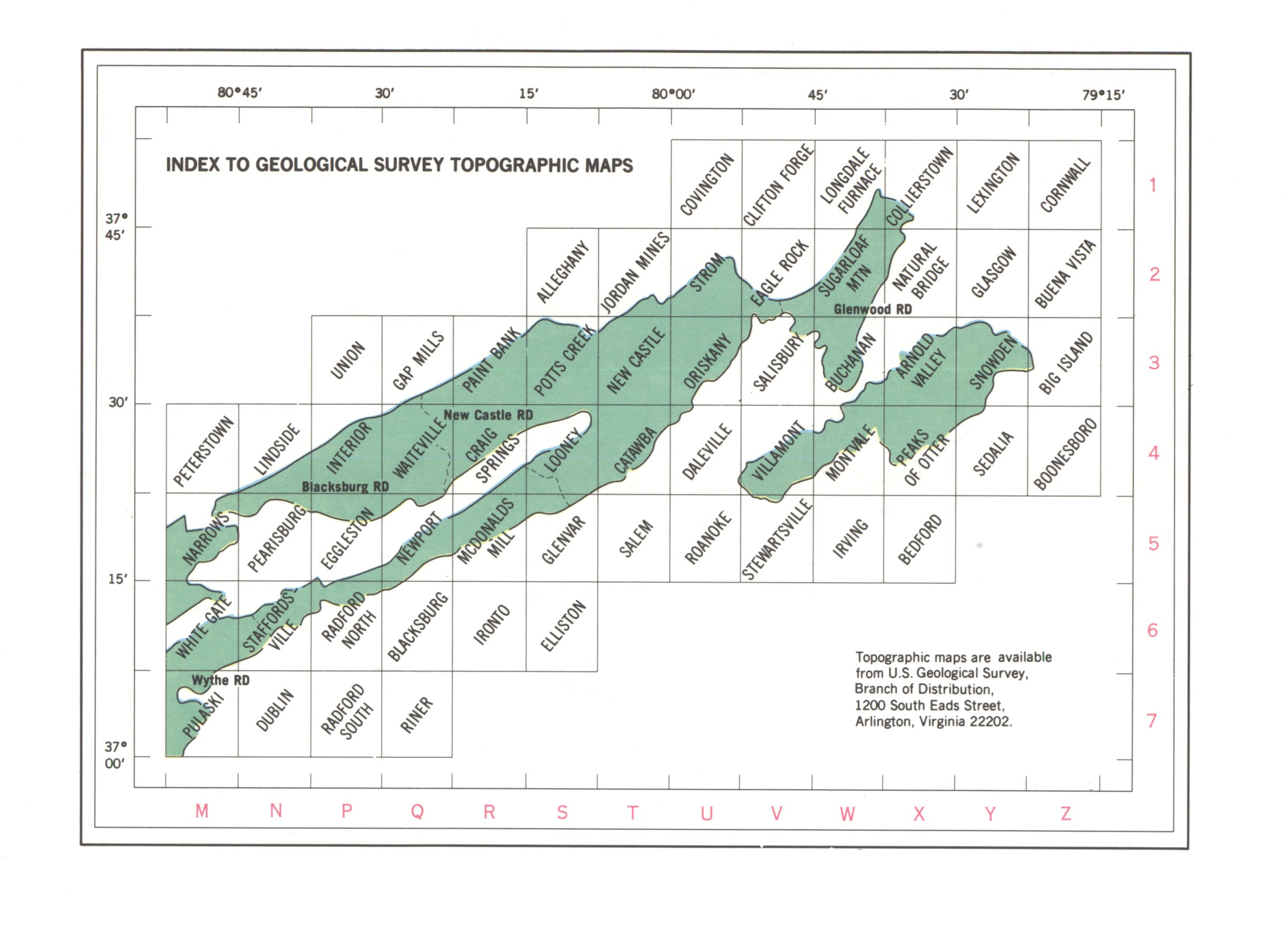
Index to topographic maps covering the northern section of the Jefferson National Forest

Map 30, from USFS Motor Vehicle Use Map 2015

== Natural history ==
The habitat of the southern Appalachians is rich in its biological diversity with nearly 10,000 species, some not found anywhere else. The great diversity is related to the many ridges and valleys which form isolated communities in which species evolve separately from one another. The region lies south of the glaciers that covered North America 11,000 years go. To escape the glaciers, northern species retreated south to find refuge in the southern Appalachians. When the glaciers retreated, many of these species remained along with the southern species that were native to the area. The diversity includes trees, mosses, millipedes and salamanders.

A small portion of the James River Gorge special biological area is included in this area. This portion contains the Kankakee globe mallow.

Wild natural trout streams in Virginia are classified by the Department of Game and Inland Fisheries by their water quality, with class i the highest and class iv the lowest. Peters Creek is ranked as a class ii trout stream.

== Forest Service management ==
The Forest Service has conducted a survey of their lands to determine the potential for wilderness designation. Wilderness designation provides a high degree of protection from development. The areas that were found suitable are referred to as inventoried roadless areas. Later a Roadless Rule was adopted that limited road construction in these areas. The rule provided some degree of protection by reducing the negative environmental impact of road construction and thus promoting the conservation of roadless areas. The northern 1,121 acres of this area has been inventoried in the roadless area review, and therefore protected from possible road construction and timber sales.

A part of the wildland on the east is "designated utility corridor", the southern portion is designated "Ruffed Grouse Habitat", and the extreme southern tip is designated "Blue Ridge Parkway Corridor". The grouse habitat designation allows timber cutting and roadbuilding.

== Nearby Wildlands ==
Nearby wilderness areas and wildlands recognized as one of Virginia's "Mountain Treasures" by the Wilderness Society are:

- James River Face Wilderness
- Thunder Ridge Wilderness
- White Oak Ridge-Terrapin Mountain
- North Creek (conservation area)
- Wilson Mountain
- Cove Mountain
