= Natural Bridge Station, Virginia =

Natural Bridge Station, Virginia (Greenlee)
- Unincorporated community
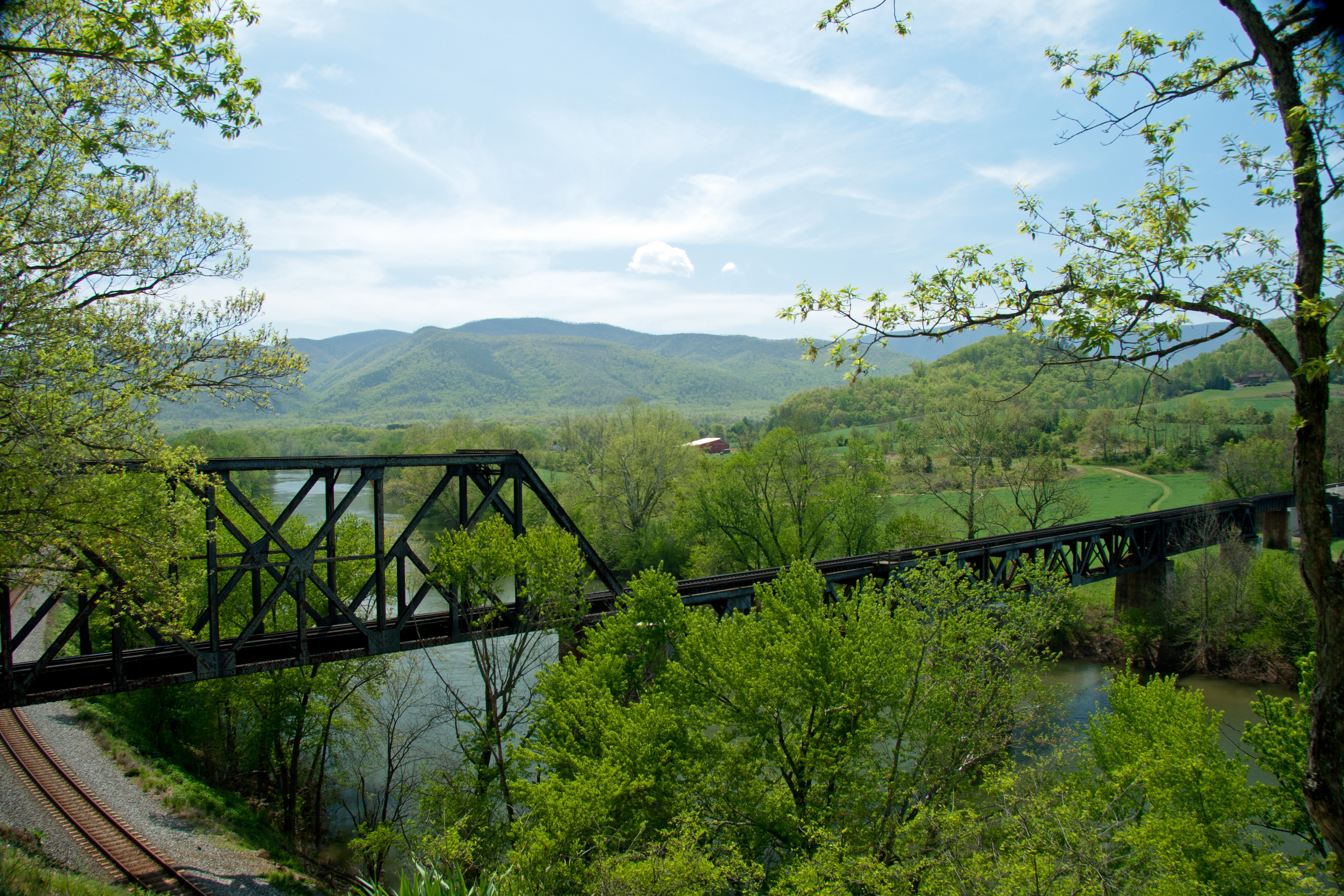
- The James River is framed by crossing railway lines at Natural Bridge Station.

- Location within Virginia Location within the United States
- Coordinates: 37°37′15″N 79°30′21″W
- Country: United States
- State: Virginia
- County: Rockbridge
- Rockbridge Board of Supervisors Current Term: January 1, 2020 - December 31, 2023

Government
  - Type: County District (Natural Bridge, Rockbridge County)
  - District Supervisor: David B. McDaniel

Area
  - Total: 33.1 sq mi (86 km^{2})
  - Land: 32.7 sq mi (85 km^{2})
  - Water: 0.4 sq mi (1.0 km^{2})
- Elevation: 764 ft (233 m)

Population (2020)
  - Total: 1,540
  - Density: 47/sq mi (18/km^{2})
- Time zone: UTC-5 (Eastern (EST))
  - Summer (DST): UTC-4 (EDT)
- ZIP code: 24579
- Area code: 540
- GNIS feature ID: 1493338

Natural Bridge Station is an unincorporated community in Rockbridge County, Virginia, United States, named for both its proximity to Natural Bridge and formerly having a train depot along the Norfolk & Western rail line. Formerly known as Sherwood and Greenlee, the community is located along the James River and Virginia State Route 130, 3.2 miles (5.1 km) west of Glasgow.

Natural Bridge Station is made up mostly of the southeastern corner of Rockbridge County encompassing all of the community of Arnolds Valley (named for the area's first settler, Stephen Arnold) and partially covering several other communities, with its southeastern border running along the Blue Ridge Parkway. Natural Bridge Station has a post office with ZIP code 24579. The population as of 2020 was 1,540.

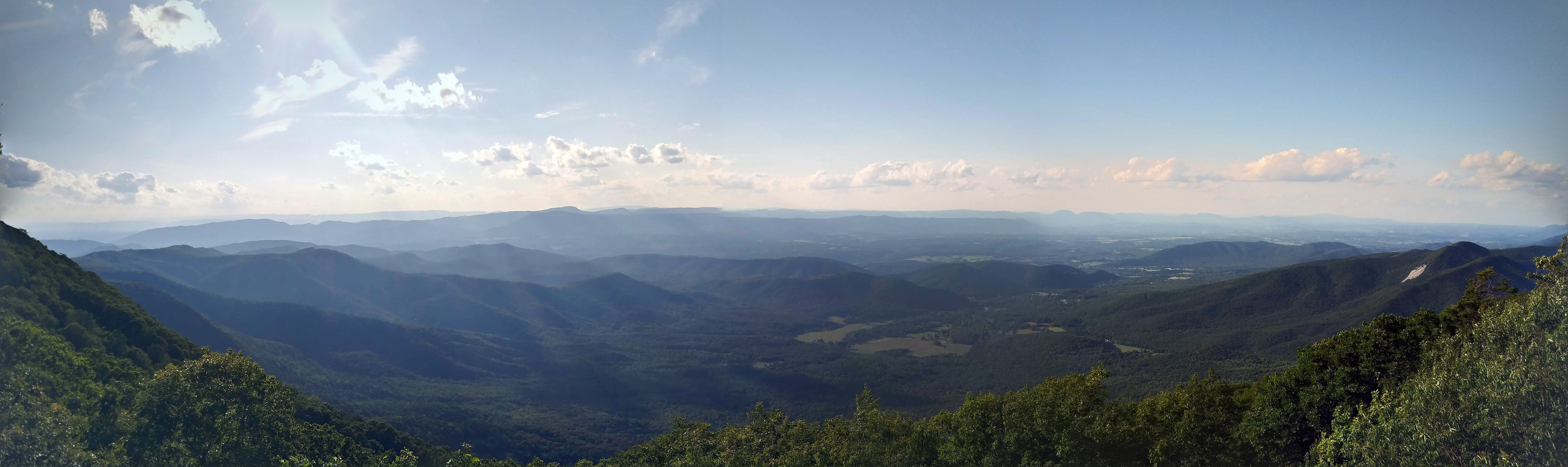
Arnolds Valley, panoramic view

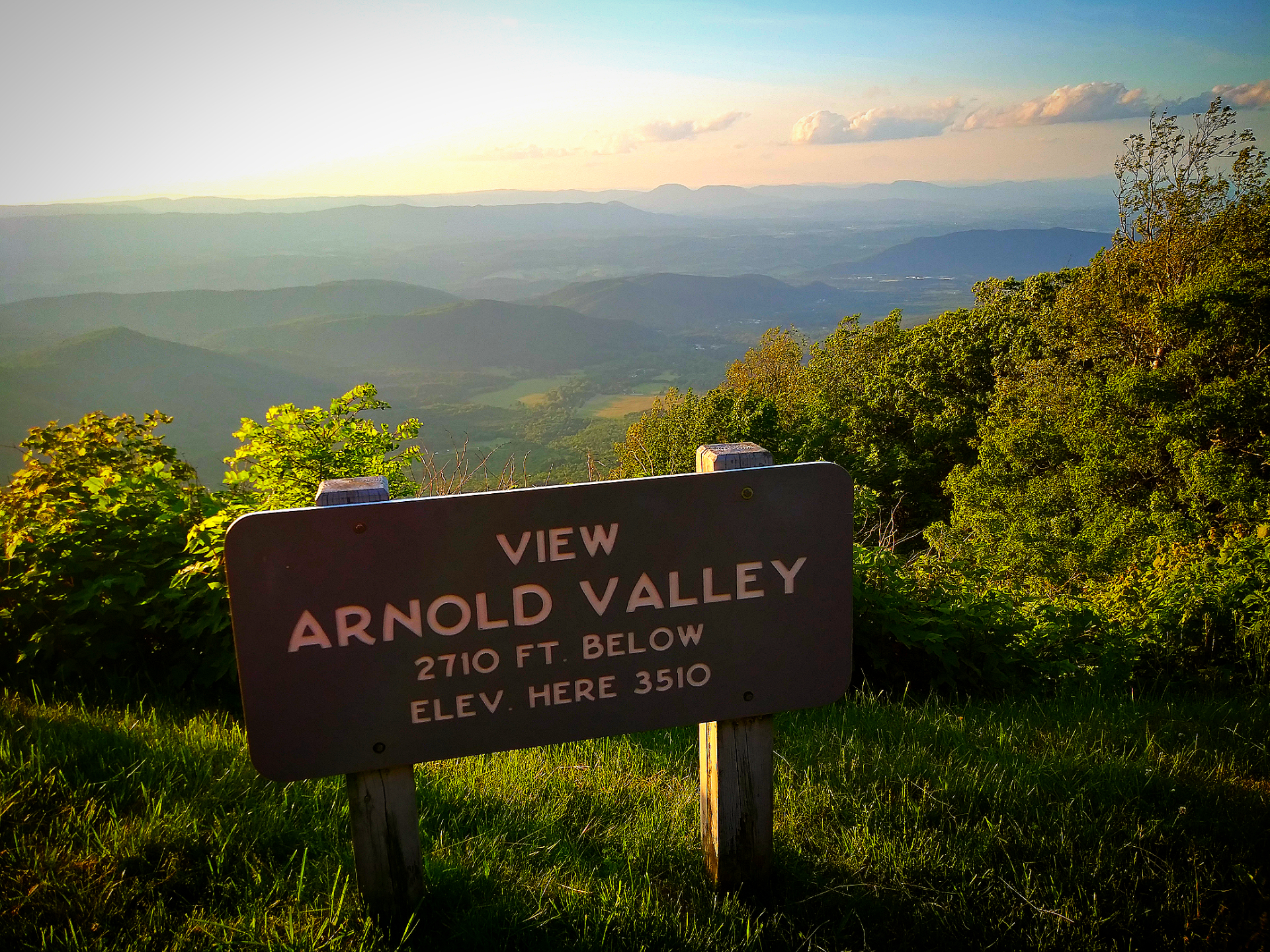
Southern Arnold Valley overlook at Thunder Ridge

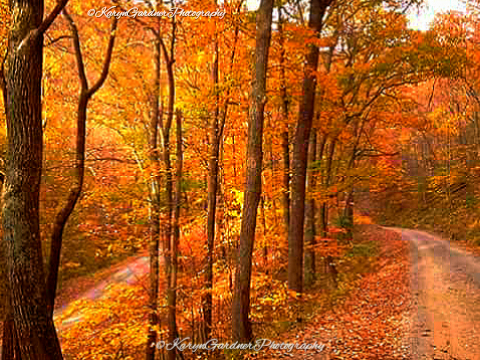
Switchback on Petite's Gap Road

== Government ==
Natural Bridge Station is governed within the Natural Bridge District of the Rockbridge County Board of Supervisors, the 24th district of the Virginia House of Delegates, the 25th district of the Virginia Senate, and Virginia's 6th congressional district of the United States House of Representatives.

Local law enforcement for Natural Bridge Station is administered by the Rockbridge County Sheriff's Department located in Lexington. Some areas of Natural Bridge Station along the Blue Ridge Parkway are patrolled by the National Park Service. Natural Bridge Station is part of the Glenwood-Pedlar Ranger District. The area's local Ranger Station is located on Ranger Lane just off Wert Faulkner Hwy.

== Schools ==
Natural Bridge Elementary School is located within the "downtown" zone of the community and serves most of southern Rockbridge County. The community's middle and high school students are bussed to Maury River Middle School and Rockbridge County High School in Lexington. The Bridge Christian Academy is a private school within the area.

The Stonebridge Community Center and the Stonebridge Community Church now occupy the main building and surrounding facilities that were once Natural Bridge High School, which closed after the graduation of its Class of 1990. The main building was sold by Sayre Enterprises to Virginia Tech in 2020.

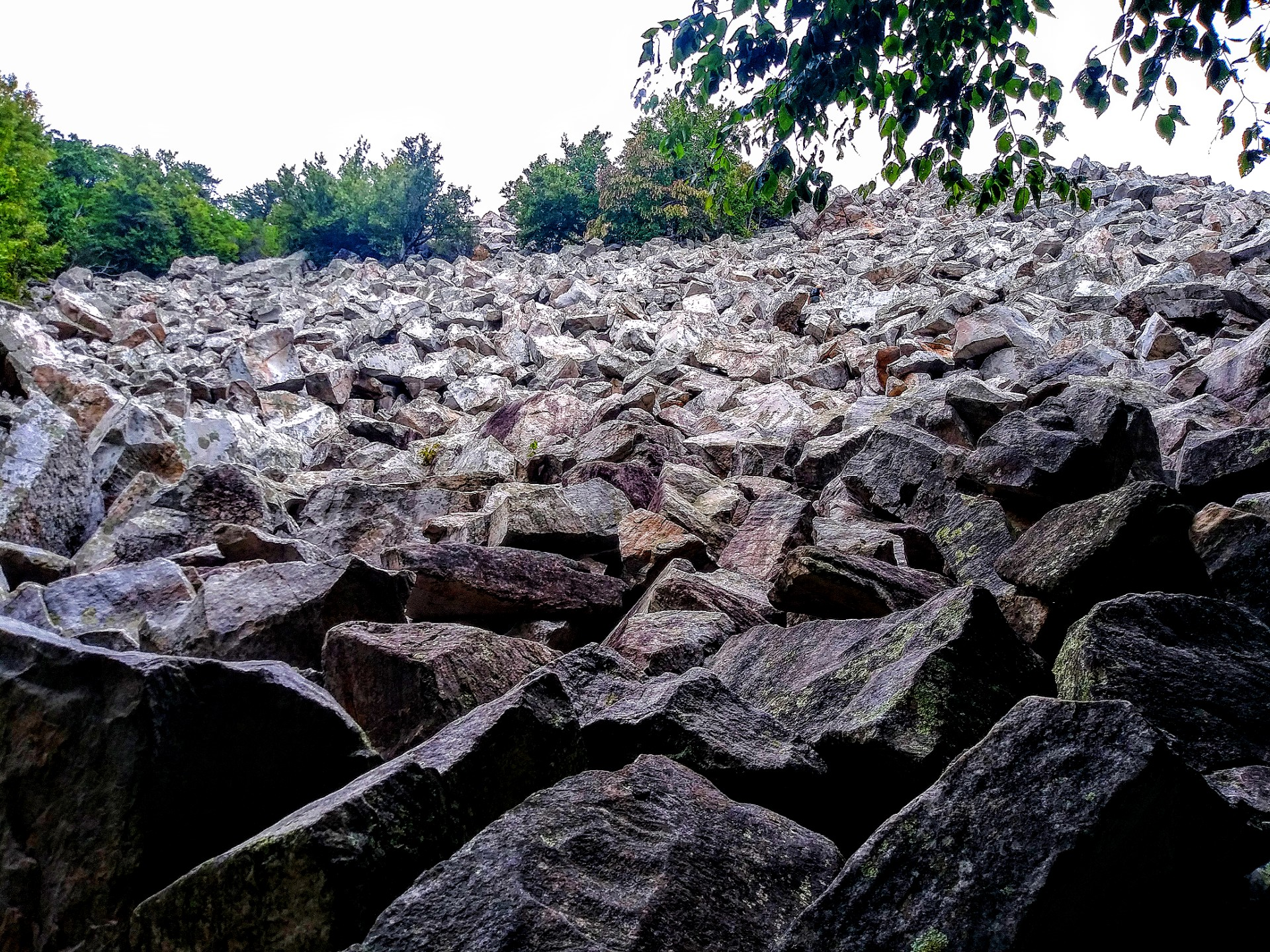
Bottom view, looking up over Devil's Marble Yard in Natural Bridge Station.

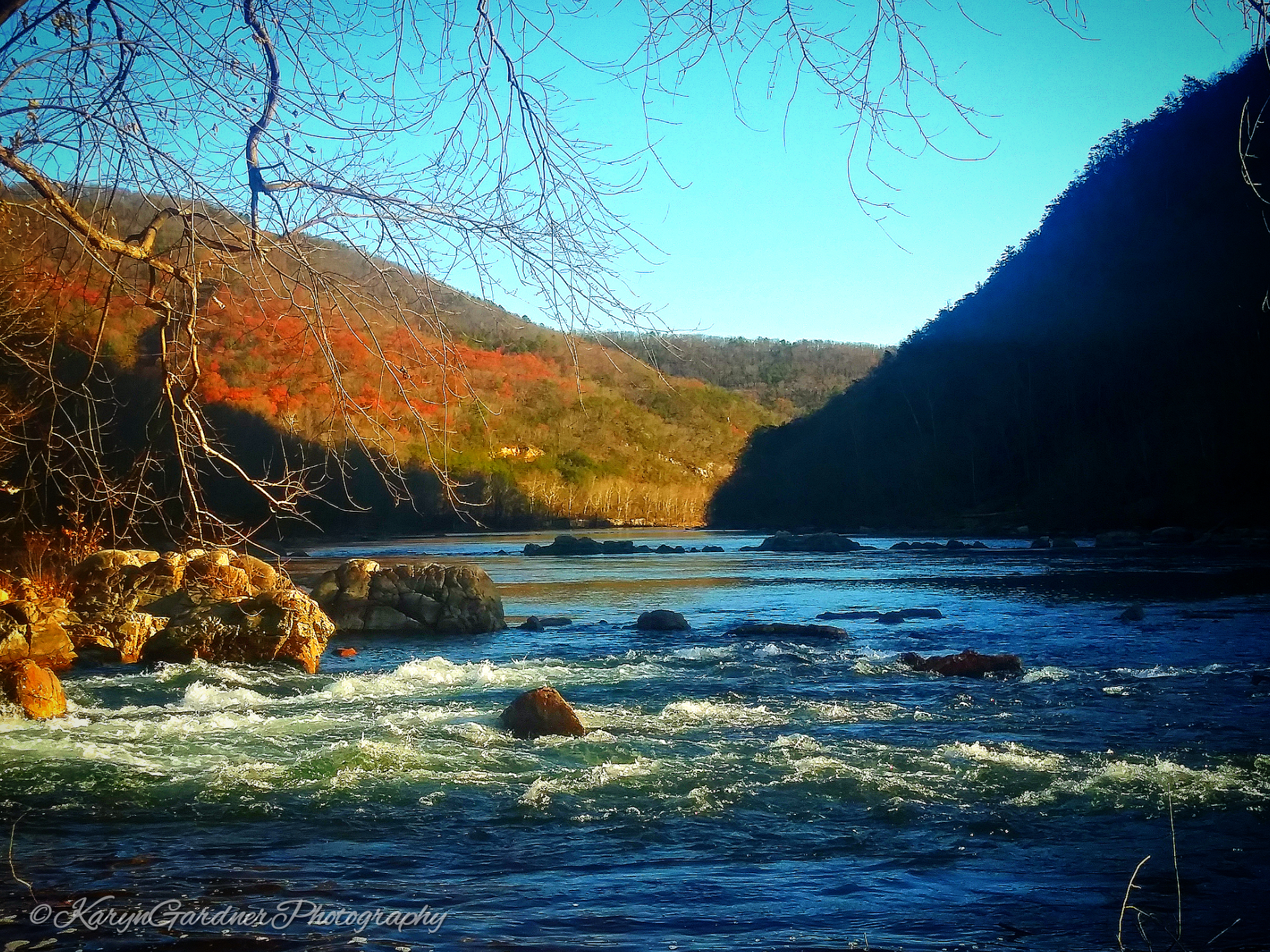
View downstream over James River near Glasgow Landing

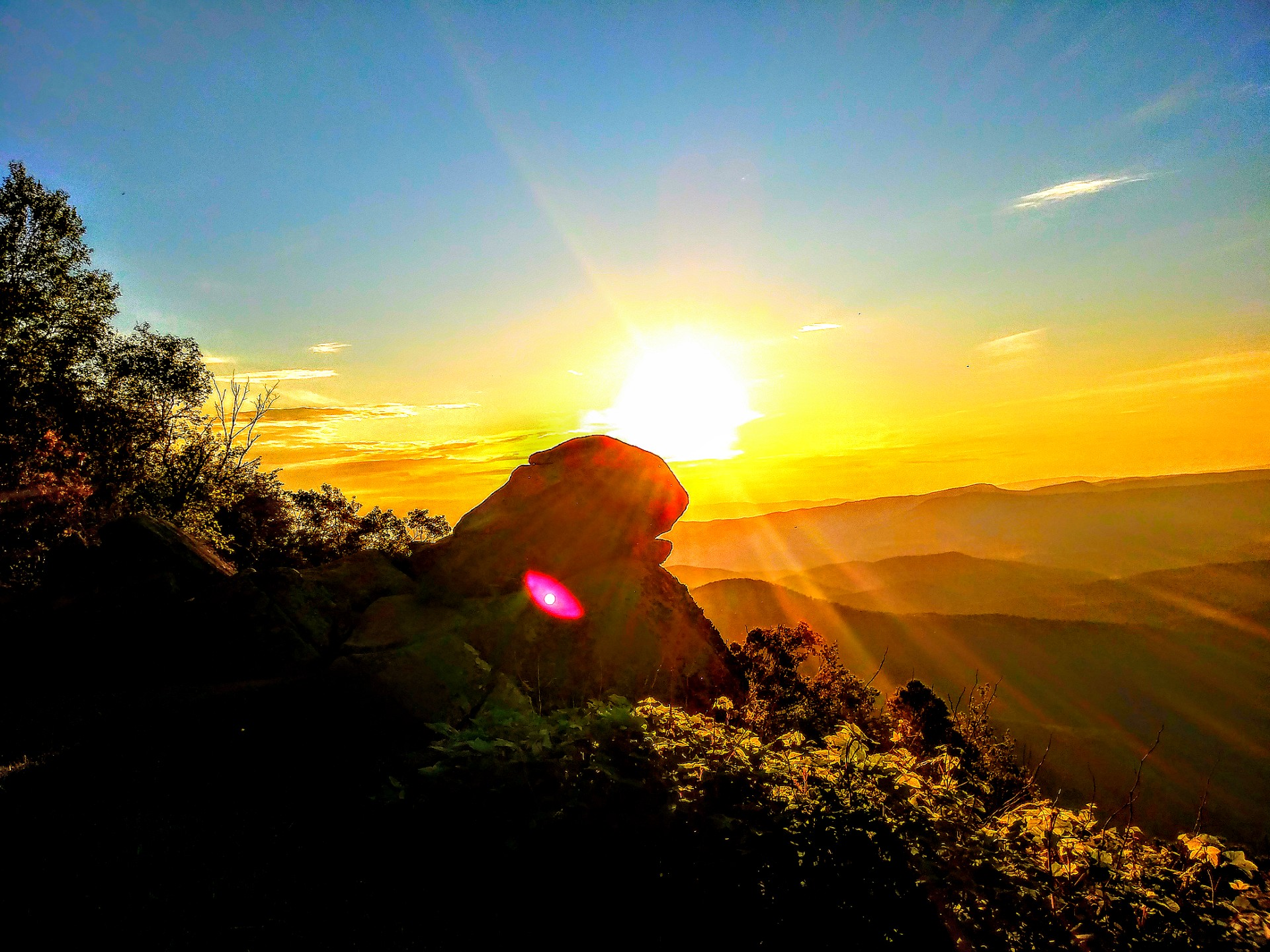
Arnold Valley overlook at Thunder Ridge at sunset
