= Kimberling Creek Wilderness =

Wilderness area in Virginia, United States

- IUCN category Ib (wilderness area)
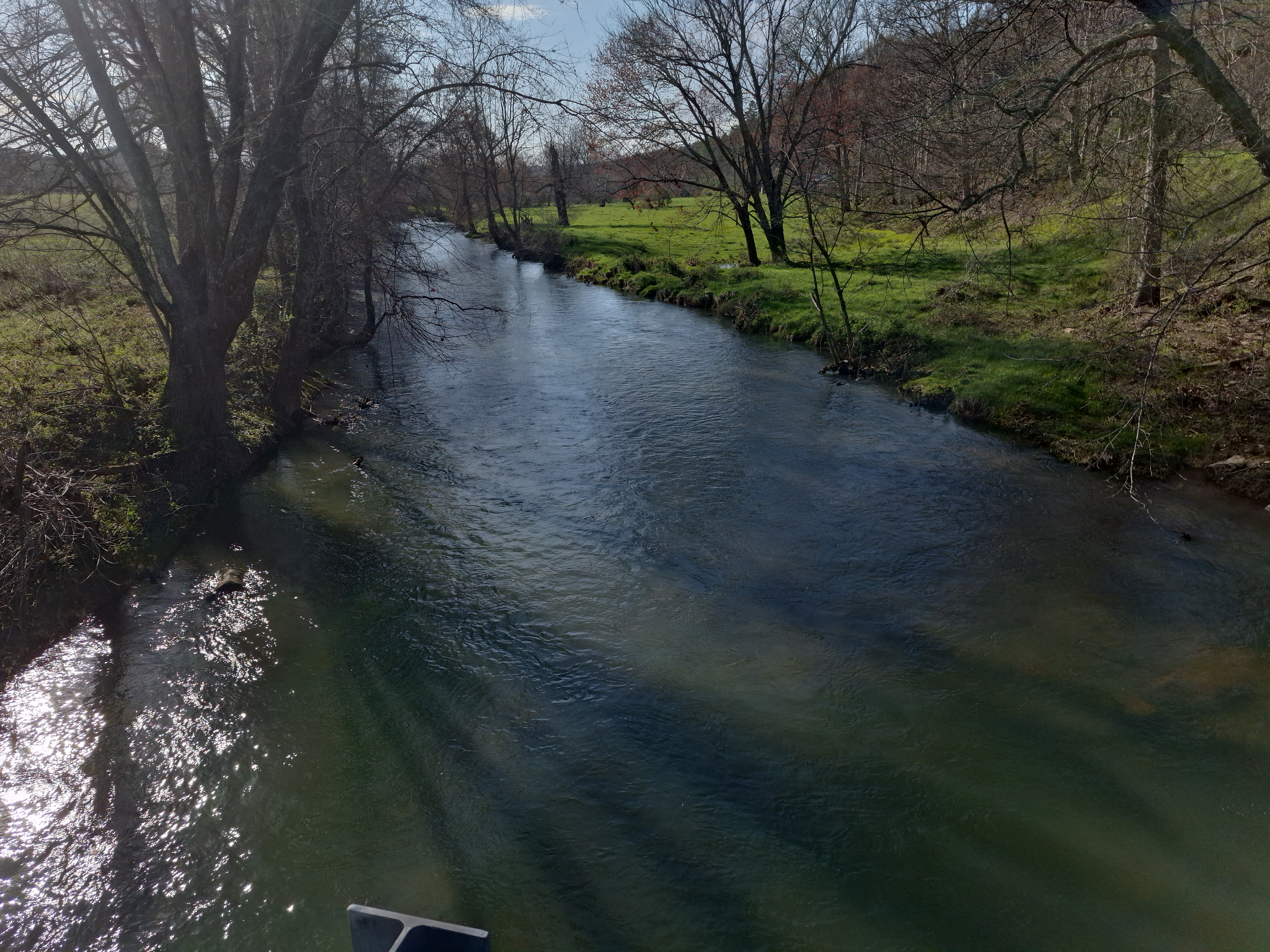
- Kimberling Creek

- Location within Virginia
- Location: Bland County Virginia, United States
- Nearest city: Bastian, Virginia
- Coordinates: 37.18683°N 81.07319°W
- Area: 5,928 acres (2,399 ha)
- Established: 1984
- Administrator: U.S. Forest Service

The Kimberling Creek Wilderness is an area protected by the Eastern Wilderness Act of Congress to maintain its present, natural condition. It is managed as part of the Jefferson National Forest. As part of the wilderness system, it helps to preserve a variety of natural life forms and contributes to a diversity of plant and animal gene pools. Over half of the ecosystems in the United States exist within designated wilderness.

With no official trails, the area offers the true wilderness experience amongst old growth forests. While there are some possibilities for off-trail walking, most of the forest and terrain are difficult to access.

The wilderness is part of the Kimberling Creek Cluster.

== Location and access ==
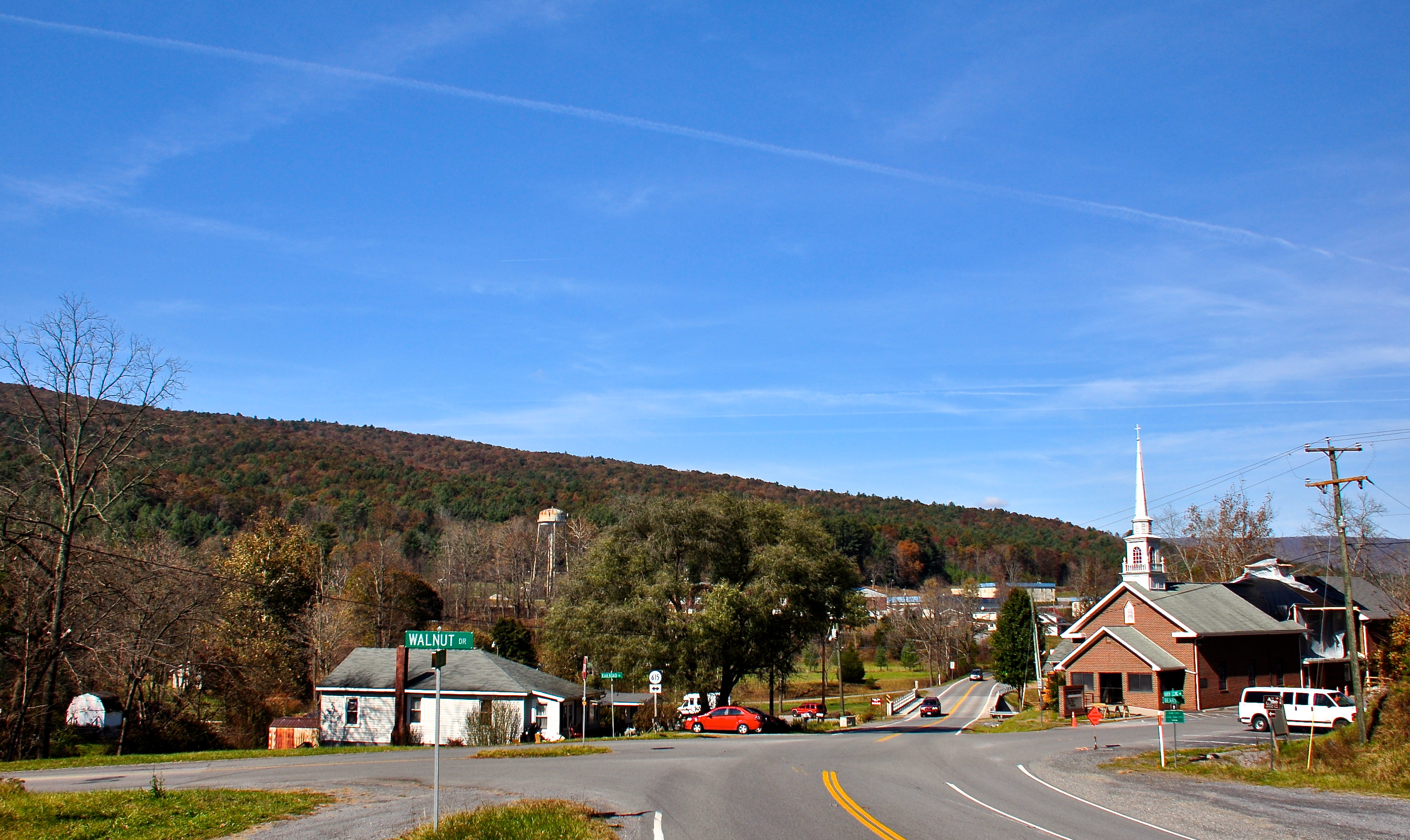
Bastian, Virginia

The area is about 3 miles west of Bastian, Virginia in Bland County in southwestern Virginia. Extending for about five miles along the slopes of Hogback Mountain, the wilderness is bounded on the north by Forest Service Road 640, a dirt road requiring a four-wheel drive vehicle.

The south side of the wilderness can be reached from Va. 281; the north end is reached from Va 640.

Boundary of Kimberling Creek Wilderness

With a rugged and steep terrain, there is a level of personal risk as one leaves the edge of the wilderness and could become lost or injured in a life-threatening situation. Visitors will require a degree of outdoor skill to traverse the area.

While there are no maintained trails, several bushwhacks and old roads offer a chance to enter the area:

- North Fork, 3.6 miles, trailhead on Forest Service Road 640
- Ridgetop Trail, 1.2 miles, trailhead on Forest Service Road 640
- Sulphur Spring Trail, 1.6 miles, trailhead on Forest Service Road 281
- Trail to the Ridge, 1 mile, trailhead on Forest Service Road 281

== Natural history ==
Protected coves in the wilderness contain white oak, tulip poplar, Frazier magnolia and yellow birch, while ridges contain varieties of oak and hickory, and the whole forest has thickets of rhododendron covering the under-story.

The wilderness has an abundance of new old growth trees. Compared to western forests where old growth trees can be quite large, new old growth trees in eastern forests are typically smaller and most readily identified by their scruffy appearance. New old growth forests can take more than 100 years to develop, then the forests will contain a variety of ages as younger trees are seeded and begin to compete with the older trees.

The dense forests provide above-ground dens for black bear, and loose, flaking bark for good summer roosting spots for the endangered Indiana bat.

The area was logged and frequently burned in the late 1800s and early 1900s.

== Topography ==
The elevation rises from 2,282 feet on Kimberling Creek to 3,200 feet on Hogback Mountain.

The center of the wilderness is drained by North Fork which begins on the summit of Hogback Mountain, is fed by many small streams, then flows out of the wilderness into Kimberling Creek. The south side of the wilderness is drained by Sulphur Spring Fork and the north by Wolfpen Branch. Kimberling Spring, on the wilderness boundary, feeds Sulphur Spring Fork.

== Cultural history ==
The area was heavily logged in the early 20th century. Remnants of steel rails, cross ties, small bridge abutments and large tree stumps still provide evidence of the timbering industry that brought logs to local mills and kilns.

== Nearby wild areas ==
- Little Walker Mountain (conservation area)
- Long Spur (conservation area)
- Seven Sisters (conservation area)
- Crawfish Valley (Bear Creek)
- Brushy Mountain (conservation area)

== See also ==
- Kimberling Creek Cluster
