= Kimberling =

Kimberling could refer to:

- Clark Kimberling, an American mathematician
  - Kimberling center, or any triangle center in the Encyclopedia of Triangle Centers, founded by Clark Kimberling
- Kimberling Creek Cluster, a forested region in Virginia, U.S.
  - Kimberling Creek Wilderness, within the region
- Kimberling City, Missouri, U.S., a city
