= National Scenic Area (United States) =

Type of federally protected area

A National Scenic Area in the United States is a federally designated area of outstanding natural and scenic value that receives a level of protection that is less stringent than wilderness designation. Scenic areas are typically occupied or used in some manner by people and either cannot be considered for wilderness designation, or are seen as suitable for a wider range of uses than those permitted under wilderness designation.

The first National Scenic Area in the United States was Mono Basin National Scenic Area in 1984, followed by the much larger and more ambitious Columbia River Gorge National Scenic Area in 1986. The Columbia River Gorge was in a region of outstanding natural beauty that was already heavily used by people. The designation of the Columbia Gorge was controversial, as it imposed a significant amount of federal control on public and private lands that had previously not been significantly regulated. Subsequent scenic area designations have been significantly less far-reaching, typically involving existing federal lands.

== List of national scenic areas ==
Name	Image	Agency	Location	Date established	Description
Alabama Hills		BLM	California; 36.36°N 118.05°W	2019	The Alabama Hills are a range of hills and rock formations near the eastern slope of the Sierra Nevada in the Owens Valley, just west of Lone Pine, California. The site is home to dozens of natural arches.
Bear Creek		USFS	Virginia; 36.54°N 81.24°W	2009	Protects the headwaters of Bear Creek in the valley between the convergent ridges of Walker Mountain (to the north) and Brushy Mountain (to the south).
Beech Creek		USFS	Oklahoma; 34.35°N 94.31°W	1988	
Columbia River Gorge		USFS	Oregon and Washington; 45.42°N 121.47°W	1986	The Columbia River Gorge is a canyon that stretches for over 80 mi (130 km) as the Columbia River winds westward through the Cascade Range, forming the boundary between the state of Washington to the north and Oregon to the south.
Coosa Bald		USFS	Georgia; 34.46°N 83.58°W	1995	
Indian Nations		USFS	Oklahoma; 34.46°N 94.42°W	1988	The wildlife and scenic area consists of 41,051 acres (16,613 ha), comprising the Winding Stair Mountains, Cedar Lake, several campgrounds, and many hiking trails. Talimena Scenic Drive winds through the southern portion of the wildlife and scenic area.
Mono Basin		USFS	California; 37.57°N 119.03°W	1984	Mono Basin is an endorheic drainage basin located east of Yosemite National Park in California and Nevada. Notable features in the basin include Mono Lake and the Mono-Inyo Craters.
Mount Pleasant		USFS	Virginia; 37.45°N 79.10°W	1994	
Saint Helena Island		USFS	Michigan; 45.51°N 84.52°W	2000	St. Helena Island is an uninhabited 240 acres (97 ha) island in the Lake Michigan approach to the Straits of Mackinac. A small shallow embayment on the island's northern shore provided shelter for both Native Americans and voyageurs who sought shelter from fierce southerly storms. By contrast, the south of the island features a watery shoal at its southernmost point, a navigational hazard which inspired the construction of the St. Helena Island Light in 1873.
Seng Mountain		USFS	Virginia; 36.43°N 81.35°W	2009	The scenic area includes Rowland Creek Falls and all portions of the Iron Mountain system within the upper drainage of the South Fork of the Holston River.

== Proposed National Scenic Areas ==
Several proposals have been advanced for additional National Scenic Areas:

- Big Sur Coast National Scenic Area, California, 1980
- Big Schloss National Scenic Area, Virginia and West Virginia, 2009
- Kelley Mountain National Scenic Area, Virginia, 2009
- Shenandoah Mountain National Scenic Area, Virginia, 2009
- Sedona-Red Rocks National Scenic Area, Arizona, legislation introduced in 2010 failed.
- Grandfather National Scenic Area, North Carolina, 2011
- Black Mountain Scenic Area, California, 2019
- Condor Ridge Scenic Area, California, 2019

== Former National Scenic Areas ==
- East Mojave National Scenic Area, designated Mojave National Preserve in 1994

== See also ==
- Protected areas of the United States
