= Saint Helena Island National Scenic Area =

National Scenic Area in Michigan, United States

- Location within Michigan
- Location: Mackinac County, Michigan, USA
- Nearest city: St. Ignace, Michigan
- Coordinates: 45°51′30″N 84°52′00″W
- Area: 240 acres (0.97 km^{2})
- Established: 2000
- Governing body: U.S. Forest Service

Saint Helena Island National Scenic Area is a federally designated National Scenic Area within the Hiawatha National Forest in the US state of Michigan. The scenic area is administered by the U.S. Forest Service. It is contains all of 240-acre (97 ha) Saint Helena Island, excluding the St. Helena Island Light. The Hiawatha National Forest was extended to encompass the island, which was acquired when existing property owners placed the land for sale.

The National Scenic Area was established by Public Law 106-431, known as the "Saint Helena Island National Scenic Area Act" of 2000.
