= Indian Nations National Wildlife and Scenic Area =

Protected area in Le Flore County, Oklahoma

- IUCN category V (protected landscape/seascape)
- Location within the United States Location within Oklahoma
- Location: Le Flore County, Oklahoma, USA
- Nearest city: Heavener, Oklahoma
- Coordinates: 34.76667°N 94.7°W
- Area: 41,051 acres (166.13 km^{2})
- Established: 1988
- Governing body: U.S. Forest Service

Indian Nations National Scenic and Wildlife Area is a federally designated National Scenic Area within Ouachita National Forest 11 miles (18 km) south of Heavener, in Le Flore County, Oklahoma USA. The 41,051-acre (16,613 ha) scenic area is administered by the U.S. Forest Service. The scenic area includes the Homer L. Johnson Wildlife Management Area. There is also a 15-acre (6.1 ha) fishing lake atop Post Mountain, developed by the U. S. Forest Service during the 1930s, is included within the scenic area.

The National Scenic Area was established by Public Law 100-499, known as the "Winding Stair Mountain National Recreation Area and Wilderness Area Act", designating the area as the Indian Nations National Scenic and Wildlife Area in 1988.

== Cedar Lake ==
Cedar Lake has 3 miles (4.8 km) of shoreline and covers an area of 78 acres (32 ha). It is a recreational lake, primarily used for fishing, although swimming and boating are also allowed and are popular. (Note: The Oklahoma Department of Wildlife Conservation (ODWC), which regulates both fishing and hunting, does not allow boat motors that exceed 7.5 horsepower.) The main fish species are channel catfish, crappie, largemouth bass, spotted bass and sunfish. Facilities include boat docks and ramps, drinking water, outdoor grills, pavilion, picnic area with tables, playground, hook-up sites for recreational vehicles and tent sites for camping.

== See also ==
- Winding Stair Mountain National Recreation Area
- Cedar Lake (Le Flore County, Oklahoma)
