= Coosa Bald National Scenic Area =

National Scenic Area in Georgia, US

- IUCN category V (protected landscape/seascape)
- Location within the United States
- Location: Union County, Georgia, US
- Nearest city: Blue Ridge, Georgia
- Coordinates: 34.76667°N 83.96667°W
- Area: 7,100 acres (29 km^{2})
- Established: 1991
- Governing body: U.S. Forest Service

Coosa Bald National Scenic Area is a federally designated National Scenic Area within Chattahoochee National Forest in northern Georgia, US. The 7,100-acre (2,900 ha) scenic area is administered by the U.S. Forest Service. The scenic area was established at the same time as the nearby Ed Jenkins National Recreation Area.

The National Scenic Area was established by Public Law 102-217, known as the "Chattahoochee National Forest Protection Act" of 1991,
