= Mount Pleasant National Scenic Area =

Protected area in Amherst County, Virginia

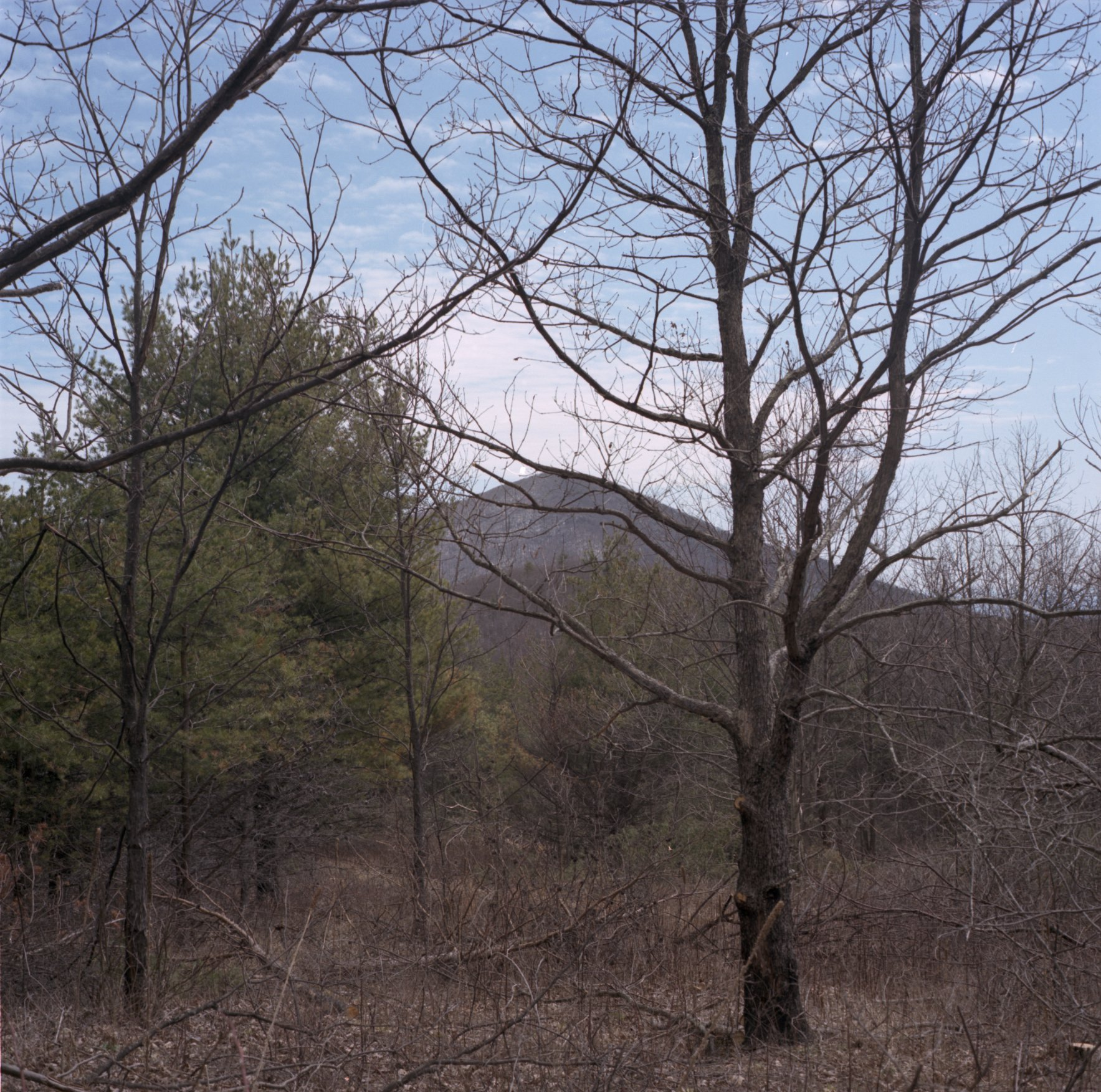
- A view of Mount Pleasant from the Scenic Area

- Location within the United States
- Location: Amherst County, Virginia, USA
- Nearest city: Lynchburg, Virginia
- Coordinates: 37°45′30″N 79°10′00″W
- Area: 7,580 acres (30.7 km^{2})
- Established: 2009
- Governing body: U.S. Forest Service

Mount Pleasant National Scenic Area is a federally designated National Scenic Area within George Washington National Forest in Virginia, USA, to the north of Lynchburg. The 7,580-acre (3,070 ha) scenic area is administered by the U.S. Forest Service. The scenic area includes a portion of the Appalachian Trail, which crosses Cole Mountain (3,920 feet (1,190 m)) and Bald Knob (4,040 feet (1,230 m)). The area also includes Mount Pleasant (4,071 feet (1,241 m)) and Pompey Mountain (4,032 feet (1,229 m)). The area was designated a scenic area as an alternative to federal wilderness designation.

The National Scenic Area was established in 1994.
