= Crawfish Valley (Bear Creek) =

Protected natural area in Virginia, United States

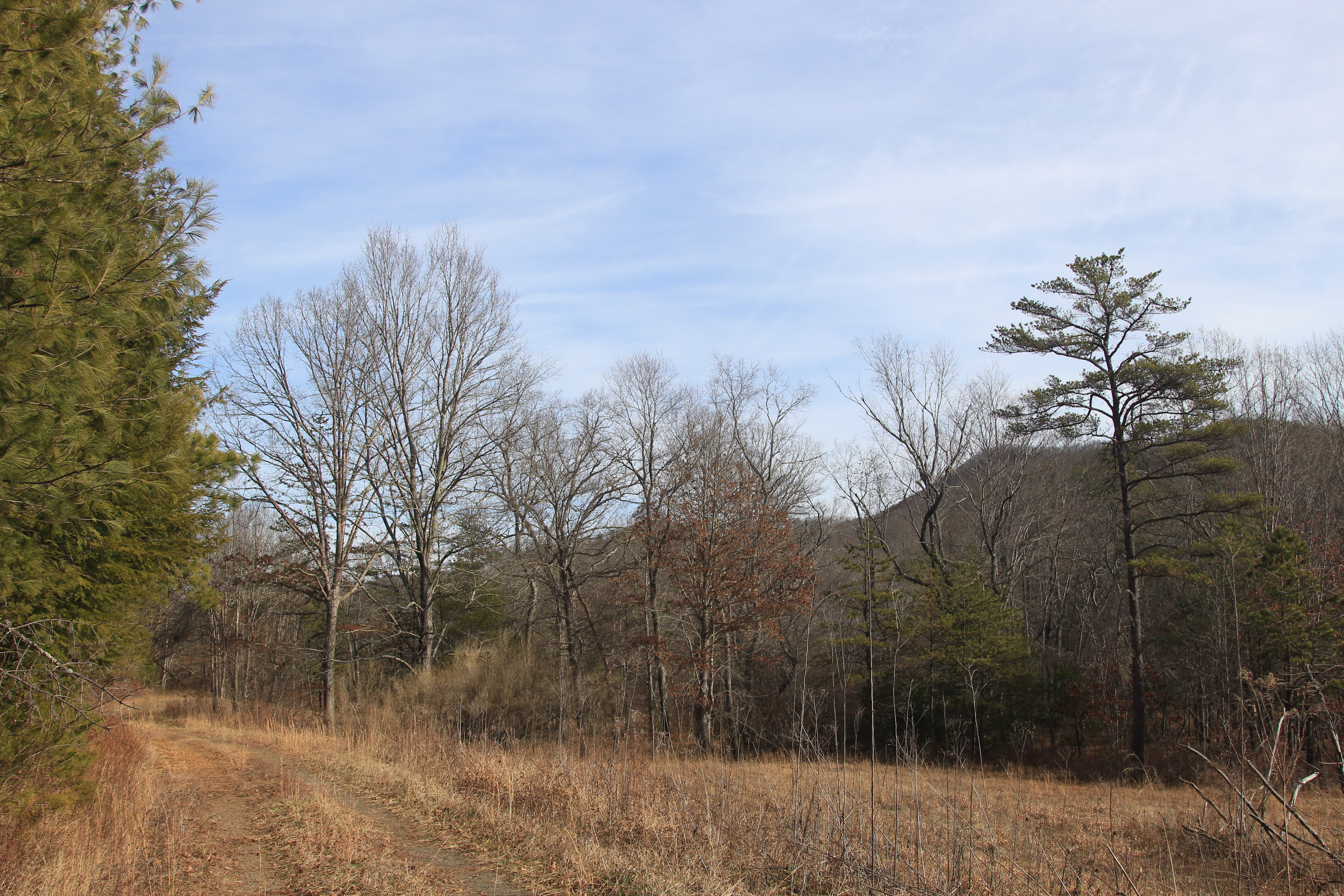
- Crawfish Valley

- Location within Virginia
- Location: Northwest of Rt. 81, Wythe County, Smyth County; Virginia, United States
- Nearest town: Wytheville, Virginia
- Coordinates: 36°57′45″N 81°20′7″W
- Area: 18,659 acres (75.51 km^{2})
- Administrator: U.S. Forest Service

Crawfish Valley, a wildland in the George Washington and Jefferson National Forests of western Virginia, has been recognized by the Wilderness Society as a special place worthy of protection from logging and road construction.

The Forest Service refers to this area as "Bear Creek", which is part of a larger area recognized by the Wilderness Society as "Crawfish Valley".

The largest inventoried roadless area in the Jefferson Forest, the immense area includes a section of the Appalachian Trail and 24 miles of other trails making the area popular with hikers and horseback riders. Bounded by Walker Mountain on the north and Brushy and Little Brushy Mountain on the south, the area possesses the size and shape needed for making its preservation as a potential wilderness practical.

The area is part of the Walker Mountain Cluster.

== Location and access ==
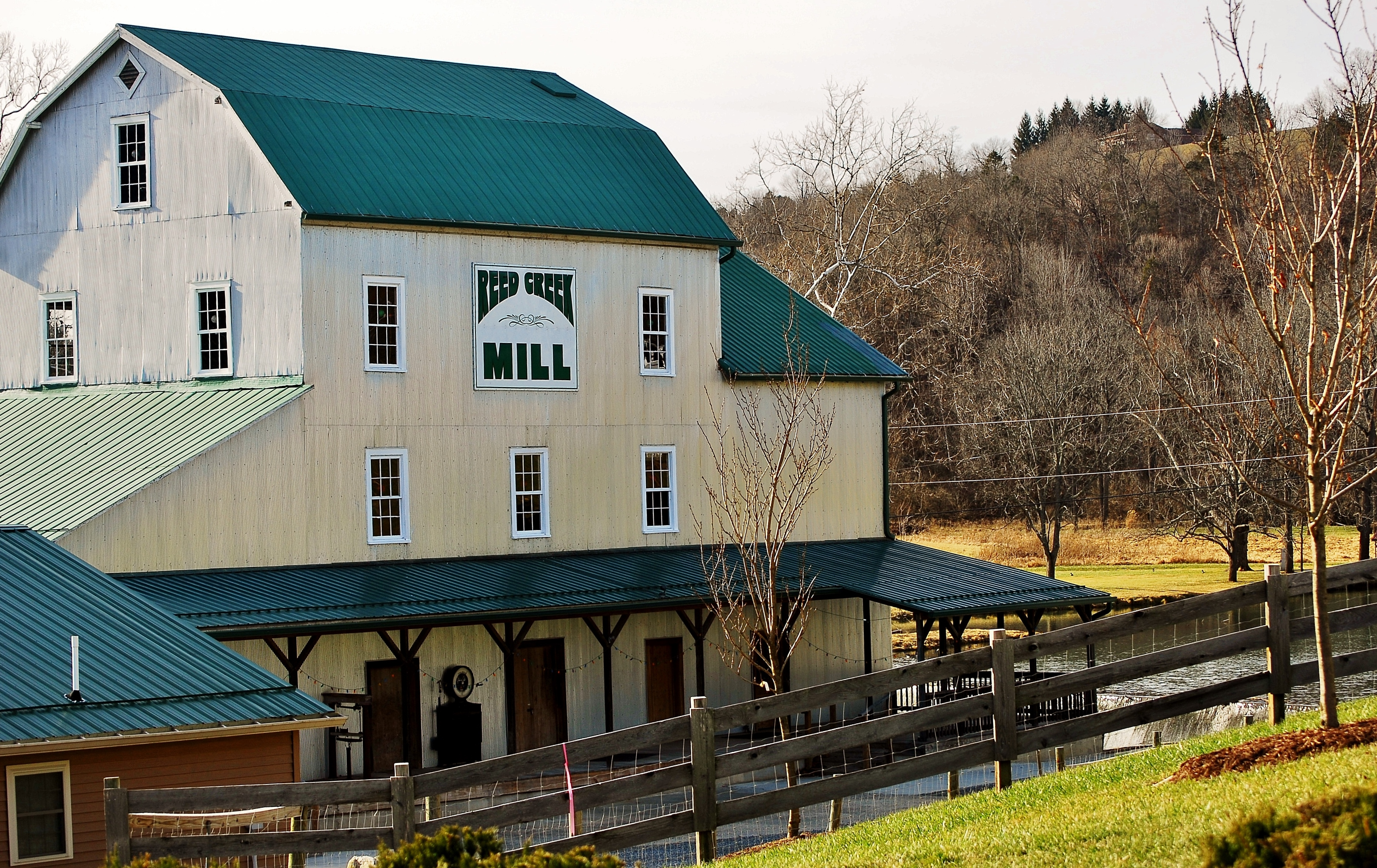
Reed Creek Mill in Wytheville, VA

The area is located in the Appalachian Mountains of Southwestern Virginia, just west of Interstate 81 and about 7 miles west of Wytheville, Virginia.

A 4.1 mile section of the Appalachian Trail crosses the southern end of the area. Hikers traveling south enter the area at Tilson Gap and leave at the crest of Brushy Mountain. The trail intersects with the Black Lick-Plaster Bank Turnpike 0.2 miles south of Tilson Gap. a turnpike used to carry gypsum (plaster) from Plaster Bank, where it was mined, to Black Lick for shipment. Gypsum was used as a fertilizer before being replaced by petroleum-based products. Continuing south, the trail passes the Crawfish Valley Trail and the Walker Mountain Trail, then reaches Reed Creek in the Crawfish Valley. Good campsites are found here. In another 1.1 miles the trail reaches the crest of Brushy Mountain where it intersects once again with the Crawfish Valley Trail, offering the possibility of a loop hike that combines this section of the AT with the Crawfish Valley Trail. The trail leaves the wild area at the crest of Brushy Mountain. The Appalachian Trail is closed to horses and mountain bikes, but a trail for horse and mountain bikes is nearby.

Other trails into the area include:

- Bear Creek Trail; Forest Trail 159; 3.5 miles; rated easy-moderate in difficulty; yellow blazed; hiking, mountain biking and horseback riding.
- Crawfish Trail; Forest Trail 6506; 10.0 miles, moderate-difficult; orange blazed; hiking, mountain biking, and horseback riding
- Walker Mountain Trail; Forest Trail 6501; 12.3 miles; moderate; yellow blazed; hiking, mountain biking and horseback riding
- Ceres Trail; Forest Trail 804.1; 2.5 miles; moderate, no blazes, hiking, mountain biking and horseback riding

The Ceres Turnpike, Forest Service Road 804.1, is an unimproved, 2.1 mile road now gated and managed as closed.

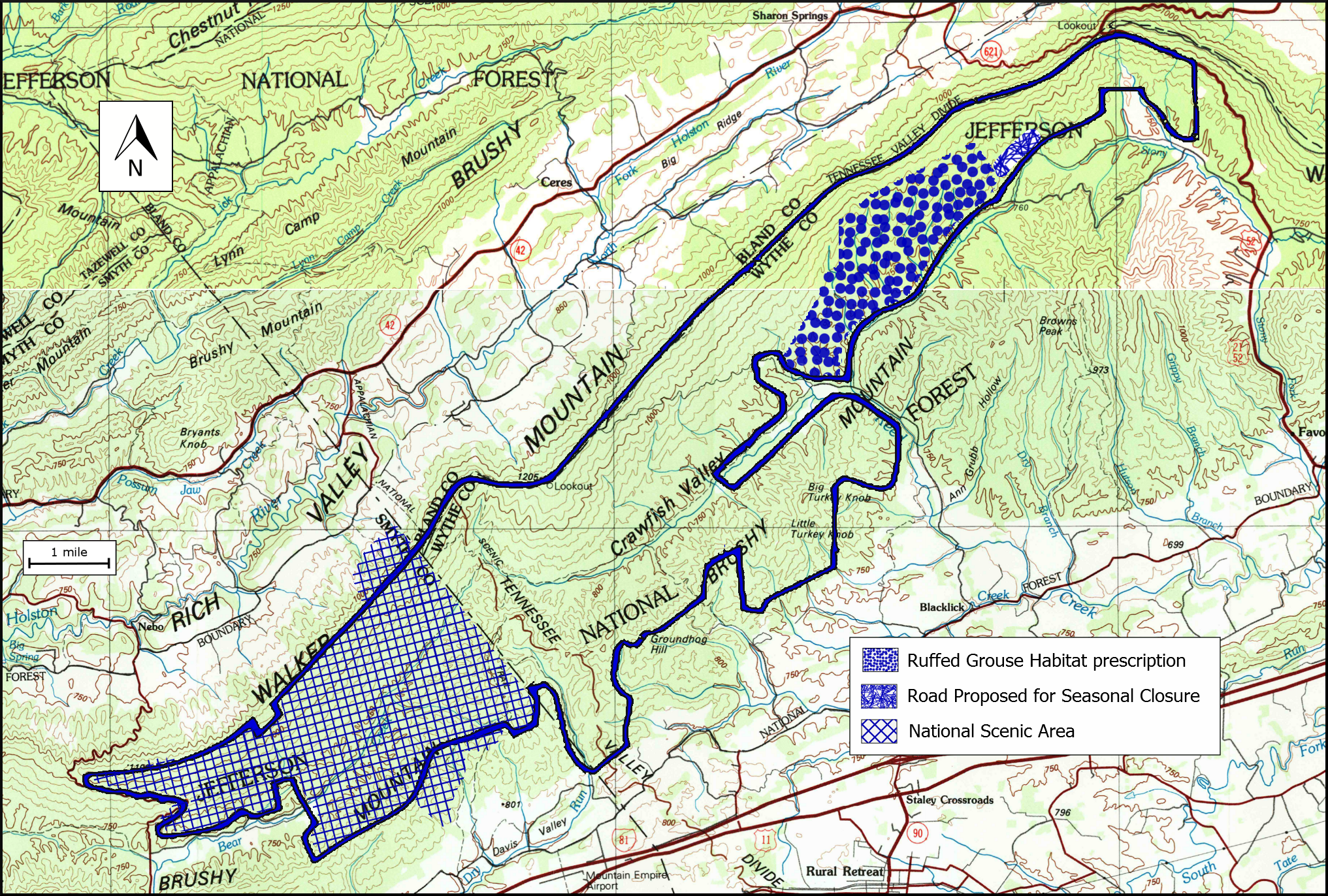
Boundary of the Crawfish Valley wildland as identified by the Wilderness Society

The boundary of the wildland recognized by the Wilderness Society is shown in the adjacent map. The map can be enlarged by selecting the icon in the lower right of the image. Additional roads and trails are given on National Geographic Maps 787 (Blacksburg, New River Valley, Trails Illustrated Hiking Maps, 787). A great variety of information, including topographic maps, aerial views, satellite data and weather information, is obtained by selecting the link with the wild land's coordinates in the upper right of this page.

Beyond maintained trails, old logging roads can be used to explore the area. The Appalachian Mountains were extensively timbered in the early twentieth century leaving logging roads that are becoming overgrown but still passable. Old logging roads and railroad grades can be located by consulting the historical topographic maps available from the United States Geological Survey (USGS). The Crawfish Valley wild area is covered by USGS topographic maps Nebo, Rural Retreat, Big Bend, and Garden Mountain.

== Natural history ==
The area is part of the Central Appalachian Broadleaf Coniferous Forest-Meadow Province. Yellow poplar, northern red oak, white oak, basswood, cucumber tree, white ash, eastern hemlock, white pine and red maple are found in colluvial drainages, toeslopes and along flood plains of small to medium-sized streams. White oak, northern red oak, and hickory dominate on the north and west, while chestnut oak, scarlet oak and yellow pine are found on ridgetops and exposed sites. There are a few stands of table mountain pine, a tree that has become uncommon because it requires fire to reproduce. There are about 70 acres of wildlife opening and old fields, mostly along and above Reed Creek, maintained by prescribed burns and mowing. There are also two artificial waterholes for wildlife.

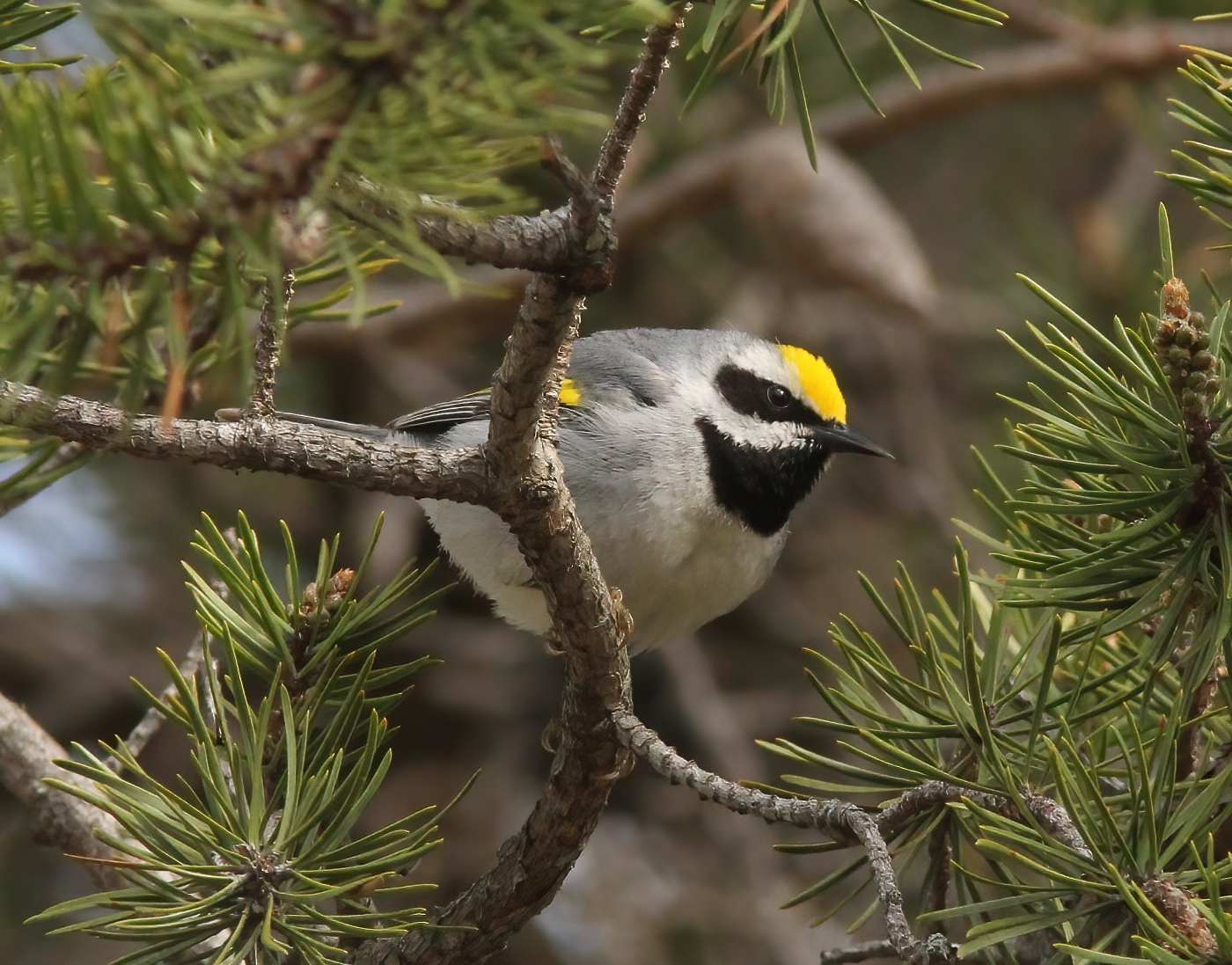
Golden-winged Warbler, Tawas Point State Park, 17 May 2014 (14031168117)

The area provides habitat for the golden-winged warbler, a species listed by the Department of Interior as a "Bird in Jeopardy" as well as on the locally rare species list maintained by the National Forest. The Tennessee dace, found in Bear Creek and Reed Creek, is listed as a federally sensitive species by the Forest Service.

There are potentially 1262 acres of old growth forest.

Along Reed Creek there is a mature woodland with a hardwood forest on adjacent hillsides as well as meadows and marshland in low-lying areas. The variety of features creates habitat for a great diversity of birds, with ruffed grouse, wild turkey, and a large number of warblers including northern parula, blue, black-and-white, Blackburnian, American redstart, ovenbird and common yellowthroat. And there are many other woodland species as well.

== Topography ==
The wildland is part of the Ridge and Valley Subsection of the Northern Ridge and Valley Ecosystem Section. Ridges, composed of sandstone and shale, run northeast–southwest, with parallel valleys created from limestone or shale.

The area includes three mountains, Walker, Brushy, and Little Brushy, as well as the headwaters of Bear Creek, Reed Creek and Guillion Fork. Monster Rock, located on the eastern end of the area, is a huge outcrop sticking out from the ridgetop of Walker Mountain.

The lowest elevation of 2360 feet is found in Six Valley, and the high elevation of 3955 feet is found at a point on the crest of Walker Mountain.

== Forest Service management ==
Congress has declared a 5503-acre section on the Smyth County side of the area a National Scenic Area called the Bear Creek National Scenic Area. It was designated as a National Scenic Area through congressional authorization under 16 USC 546b. This legislation, involving part of the Jefferson National Forest, established the Bear Creek Scenic Area to protect its scenic quality, water resources, and natural characteristics. In the Scenic Area logging and road building are prohibited, but other activities, such as mountain biking, are allowed. The land outside the Scenic Area has been inventoried and is listed as an inventoried roadless area. Later a Roadless Rule was adopted that limited road construction in inventoried roadless areas. The rule provided some degree of protection by reducing the negative environmental impact of road construction and thus promoting the conservation of roadless areas. Since most of Crawfish Valley was inventoried in the roadless area review, it is protected from possible road construction and timber sales.

The forest service classifies areas under their management by a recreational opportunity setting that informs visitors of the diverse range of opportunities available in the forest. Most of the area in Smyth County is a national scenic area, the remaining area in Smyth County, located near Newman Hollow Rd. (Rt. 6261) in Smyth county, is designated "Black Bear Habitat". Most of the remaining area on the Wythe County side is designated as "Backcountry-Natural Processes" or "Backcountry-Nonmotorized". A large part in Six Valley is designated "Ruffed Grouse Habitat", and the eastern end of the wild area has a section designated "Maintenance/Restoration of Forest Communities" and "Scenic Corridor". The highest level of protection for backcountry areas is the "Backcountry-Natural Process" designation.

The area includes 243 acres of land for which the mineral rights are privately owned.

== Cultural history ==
The Mozer Place, an old homesite in Crawfish Valley, is next to the Crawfish Trail. As of March 1998, a survey for cultural resources in about 1085 acres found nine prehistoric transient camps. There is a high probability of finding historic farmsteads within the area.

== See also ==
- Walker Mountain Cluster
- Big Walker Mountain
- Crawfish Valley
- Monster Rock
