= Walker Mountain Cluster =

Protected natural area in Virginia, US

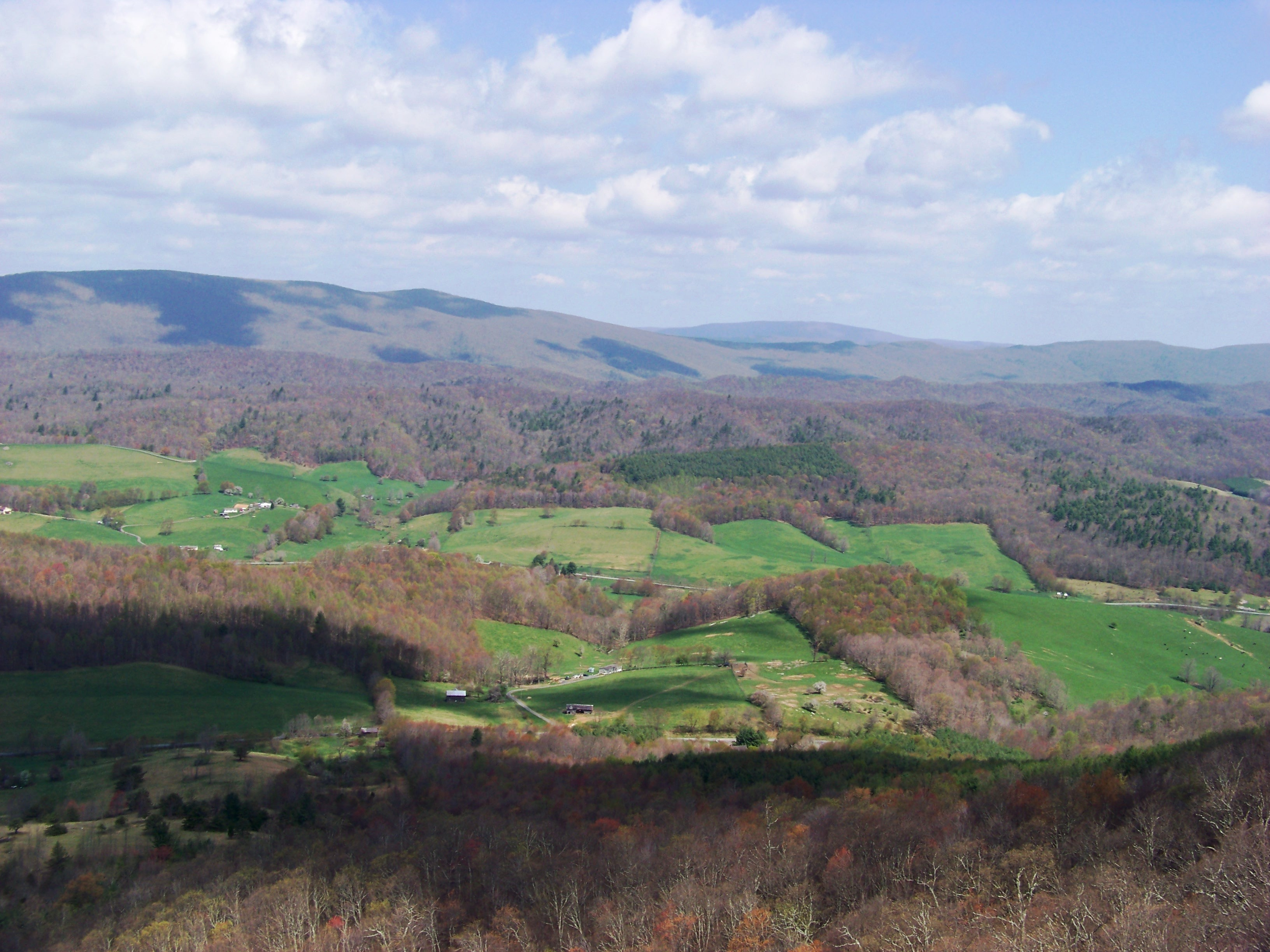
- View from Big Walker Mountain Fire Tower

- Location within Virginia
- Location: Giles, Bland, Pulaski, Wythe, Smyth Counties; Virginia, United States
- Nearest town: Wytheville, Virginia
- Coordinates: 37°0′29″N 81°9′33″W
- Administrator: U.S. Forest Service

The Walker Mountain Cluster is a region in the Jefferson National Forest recognized by The Wilderness Society for its diversity of habitats extending along Walker Mountain. The mountain, part of the Appalachian Mountains in southwest Virginia, borders the western side of the Great Valley of Virginia. Interstate 81 traverses the Great Valley as it takes travelers between Tennessee and West Virginia.

== Description ==
The Walker Mountain Cluster contains five wildlands recognized by the Wilderness Society as “Mountain Treasures”, areas that are worthy of protection from logging and road construction.

The areas in the cluster are:

- Big Walker Mountain
- Little Walker Mountain (conservation area)
- Long Spur (conservation area)
- Seven Sisters (conservation area)
- Crawfish Valley (Bear Creek)

Nearby wild areas:

- Big Survey Wildlife Management Area

== Location and access ==
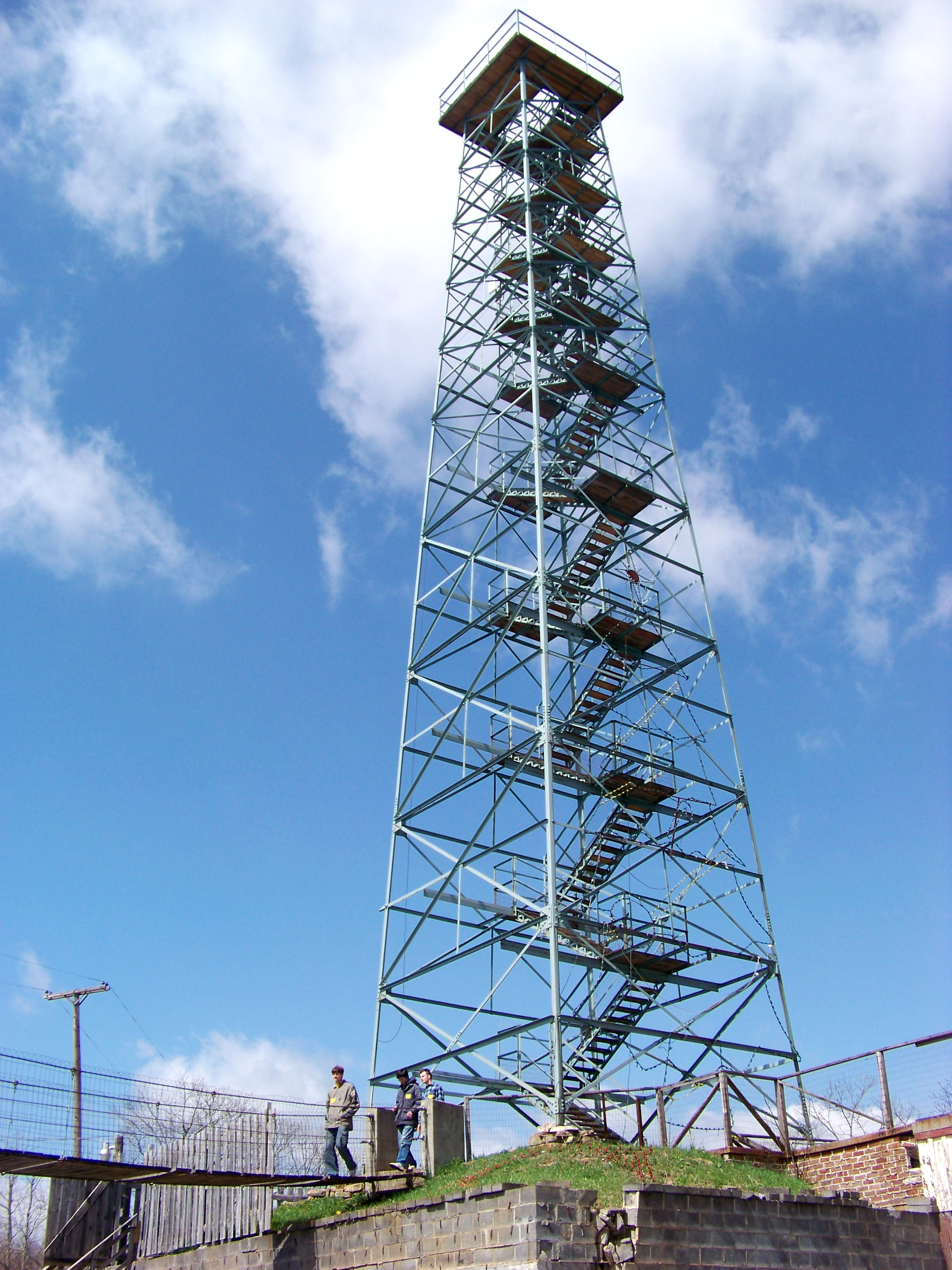
Big Walker Mountain Fire Tower

The cluster extends along Walker Mountain from its southern end near Rural Retreat, Virginia to its northern end near Pulaski, Virginia. Recent maps identify the mountain as “Walker Mountain”, but it is often referred to by the name “Big Walker Mountain”.

Route 52 crosses Walker Mountain passing by Big Walker Lookout at the crest. Interstate I-77 passes under Walker Mountain in Big Walker Mountain Tunnel.

There are many roads giving access to the area. Roads and trails in the cluster are shown on National Geographic Map 787 (Blacksburg, New River Valley). The map also gives trail information. A great variety of information, including topographic maps, aerial views, satellite data and weather information, is obtained by selecting the link with the wild land’s coordinates in the upper right of this page.

== Biological significance ==
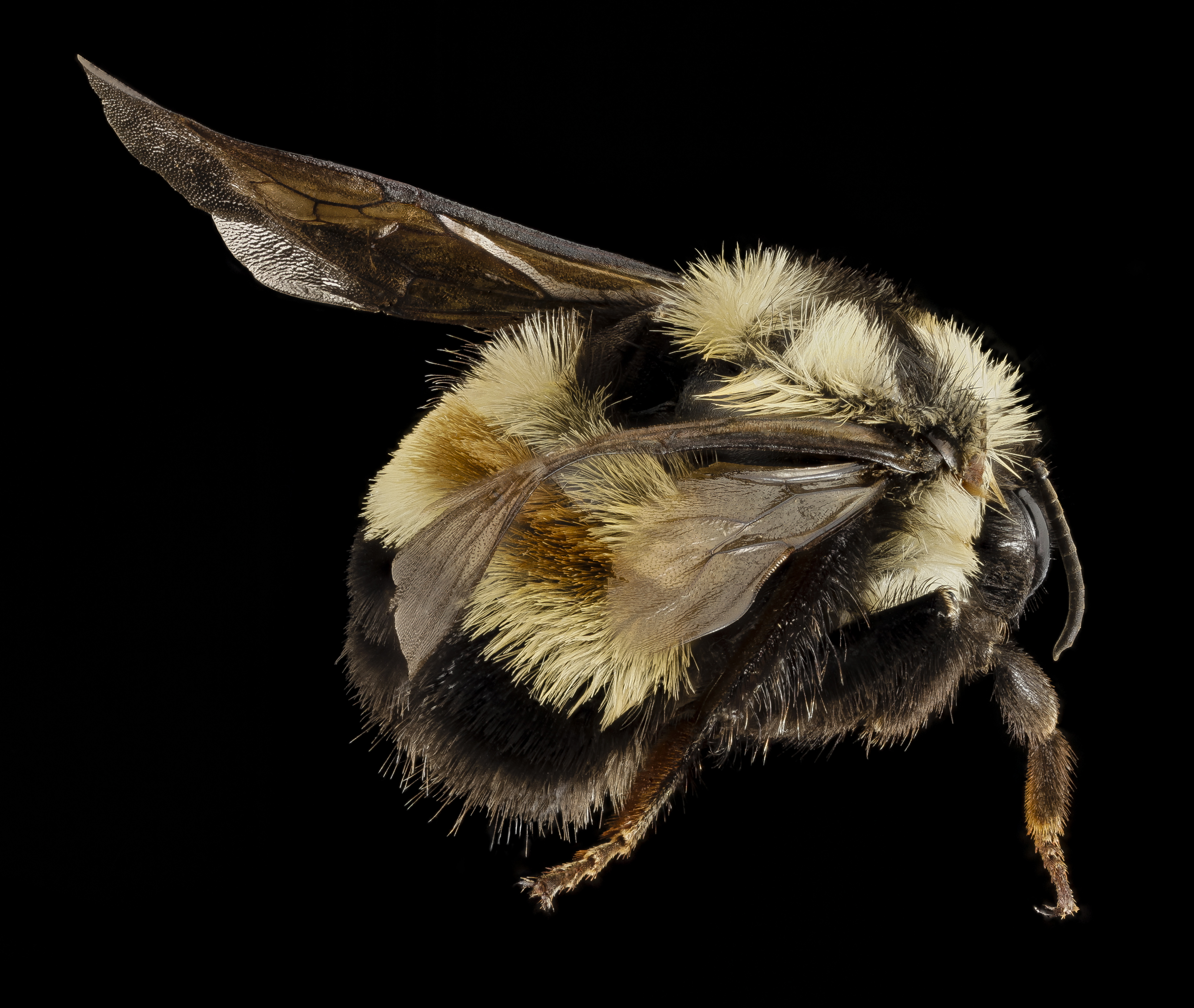
Bombus affinis, Rusty-patched Bumble Bee

The land form, climate, soils and geology of the Appalachian highlands, as well as its evolutionary history, have created one of the most diverse collection of plants and animals in the deciduous forests of the temperate world. The cluster's large tract of land supports species, such as black bear and some bird species, that require extensive tracts of unbroken forest for survival.

The cluster provides habitat for species that are critically imperiled, as indicated by their NatureServe conservation status. Among these are the Wytheville cave beetle, basil mountain mint, Rusty-patched Bumblebee, and a forest terrestrial community, the Northern White-Cedar Slope Forest.

== Geologic history ==
The cluster is in the Ridge and Valley Province that extends along the western boundary of Virginia. The Ridge and Valley province is composed of long, relatively level-crested, ridges with highest elevations reaching over 3600 feet. The province marks the eastern boundary in the Paleozoic era of an older land surface on the east. It was uplifted and eroded during the Paleozoic with extensive folding and thrust-faulting. Resistant quartzite, conglomerates and sandstones form the ridge caps while less resistant shales and limestones eroded to form the intervening valleys. The province is part of the Appalachian Mountains.

Walker Mountain extends from Abingdon to the New River, where the ridge of Walker Mountain continues across the river but is now named Sinking Creek Mountain. There are other ridges on both sides of Walker Mountain with names that change as they move northeast. On the west is Little Mountain with a name change to Brushy Mountain. On the east another ridge, first called Little Brushy Mountain, becomes Brushy Mountain, then changes back to Little Brushy, then Brushy, then Little Walker and then, where the ridgeline is broken by the New River, it becomes Brushy Mountain again.

The Tennessee Valley Divide crosses the southern end of the cluster. Bear Creek is part of the Tennessee River Drainage, while other creeks in the cluster are part of the New River Drainage.

The Crawfish Valley is underlain by black shale formed in a sea without life. The sea had two layers that did not mix. Organic matter in the upper layer dropped into the lower layer depleting its oxygen forming a black mud. As time progressed, the black mud formed a black shale. Pyrite was also deposited in the valley leaving an acid soil which is infertile and was avoided by early settlers who wanted to grow crops.

== Cultural history ==
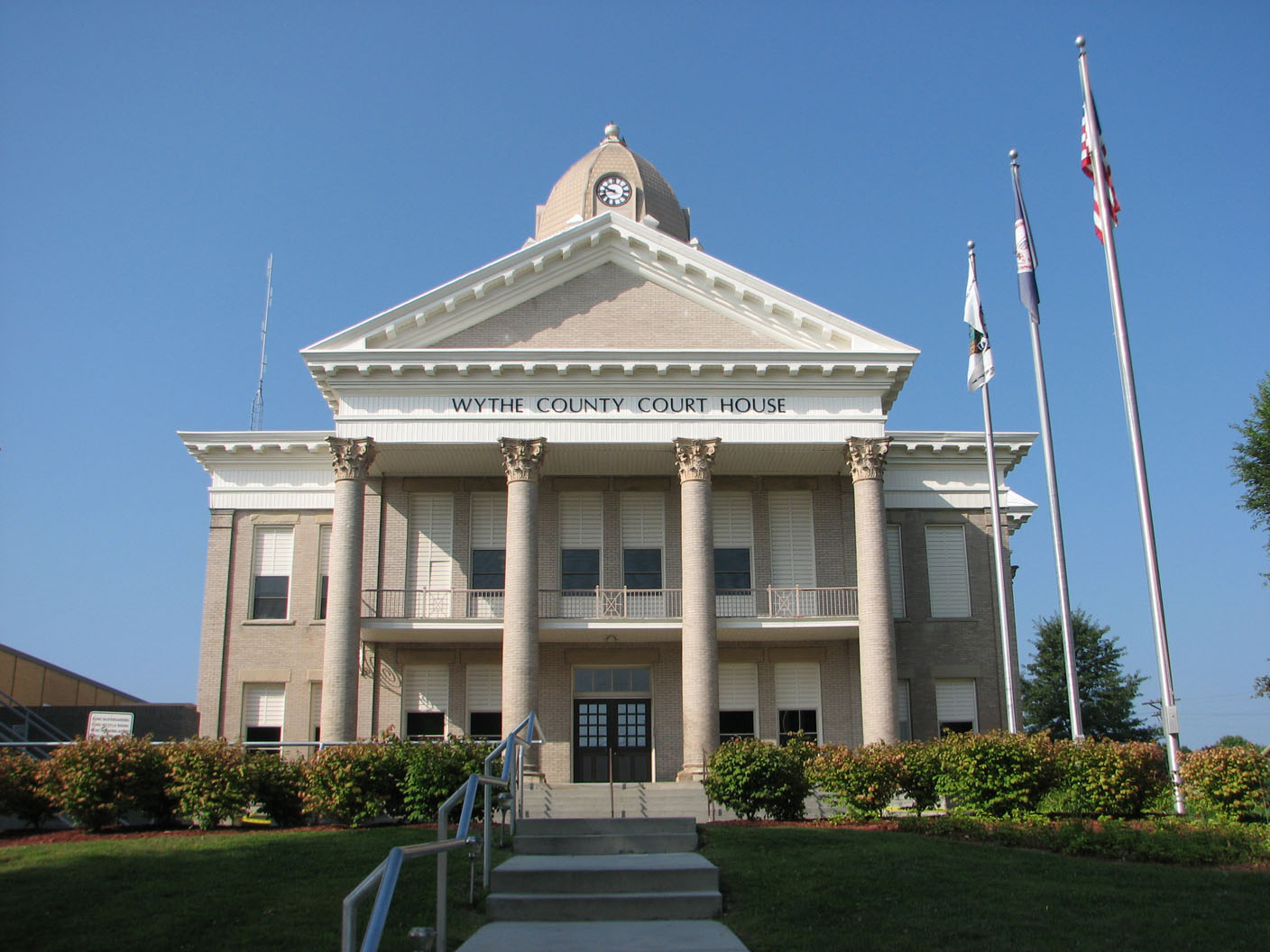
Wytheville County Court House

Pulaski, on the north, and Wytheville, on the south, are the two largest towns near the cluster. Pulaski was developed as a stopping point for the railroad between Roanoke and Bristol. Incorporated in 1886, it was once a major industrial center with railroad repair shops, textile factories and lumber mills. Wytheville was incorporated in 1839. Its proximity to lead mines, and the only salt works in the south, brought the attention of northern armies during the civil war. A union cavalry effort to tear up the railroad line in 1863 was countered by the home guards of the confederate forces

== Other clusters ==
Other clusters of the Wilderness Society's "Mountain Treasures" in the Jefferson National Forest (north to south):

- Glenwood Cluster
- Craig Creek Cluster
- Barbours Creek-Shawvers Run Cluster
- Sinking Creek Valley Cluster
- Mountain Lake Wilderness Cluster
- Angels Rest Cluster
- Kimberling Creek Cluster
- Garden Mountain Cluster
- Mount Rogers Cluster
- Clinch Ranger District Cluster
