= Brushy Mountain (conservation area) =

Protected natural area in Virginia, United States

- Location within Virginia
- Location: Bland County; Virginia, United States
- Nearest town: Bland, Virginia
- Coordinates: 37°7′9″N 81°4′35″W
- Area: 4,183 acres (16.93 km^{2})
- Administrator: U.S. Forest Service

Brushy Mountain, a wildland in the George Washington and Jefferson National Forests of western Virginia, has been recognized by the Wilderness Society as a special place worthy of protection from logging and road construction. The Wilderness Society has designated the area as a "Mountain Treasure".

With seven miles of the Appalachian Trail, the area is popular with hikers and hunters. The Forest Service has classified about 98% of the area as possessing high scenic integrity.

The area is part of the Kimberling Creek Cluster.

== Location and access ==
The area is located in the Appalachian Mountains of Southwestern Virginia, just east of Interstate 77 and about 3 miles northeast of Bland, Virginia. VA 42 is south of the area, coming within 0.3 miles at one point. The area is bounded by VA 612 on the north.

The Appalachian Trail passes through the area in an east–west direction, for the most part along the crest of Brushy Mountain. Going south on the trail, beginning at the trailhead on VA 611 (Slide Mountain Road) the trail climbs up to the crest of Brushy Mountain then exits the area at the trailhead on VA612. Points along the trail are: va

- 0.0 mile, trailhead on VA 611
- 2.2 miles, turn left to follow old road
- 4.5 miles, turn right onto graded path
- 5.7 miles, ascend on road
- 6.6 miles, intersection with 0.3 mile trail on left leading to Helveys Mill Shelter
- 6.8 miles, bear right to descend on woods road
- 7.7 miles, follow railroad grade
- 7.9 miles, cross Kimberling Creek, water unsafe to drink
- 8.0 miles, reach trailhead on VA 612

The area has no improved or unimproved roads. However, there are about 2.6 miles of old access and logging roads which are overgrown and passable only by foot. Old logging roads and railroad grades can be located by consulting the historical topographic maps available from the United States Geological Survey (USGS). The Brushy Mountain wild area is covered by USGS topographic maps Bland and Rocky Gap.

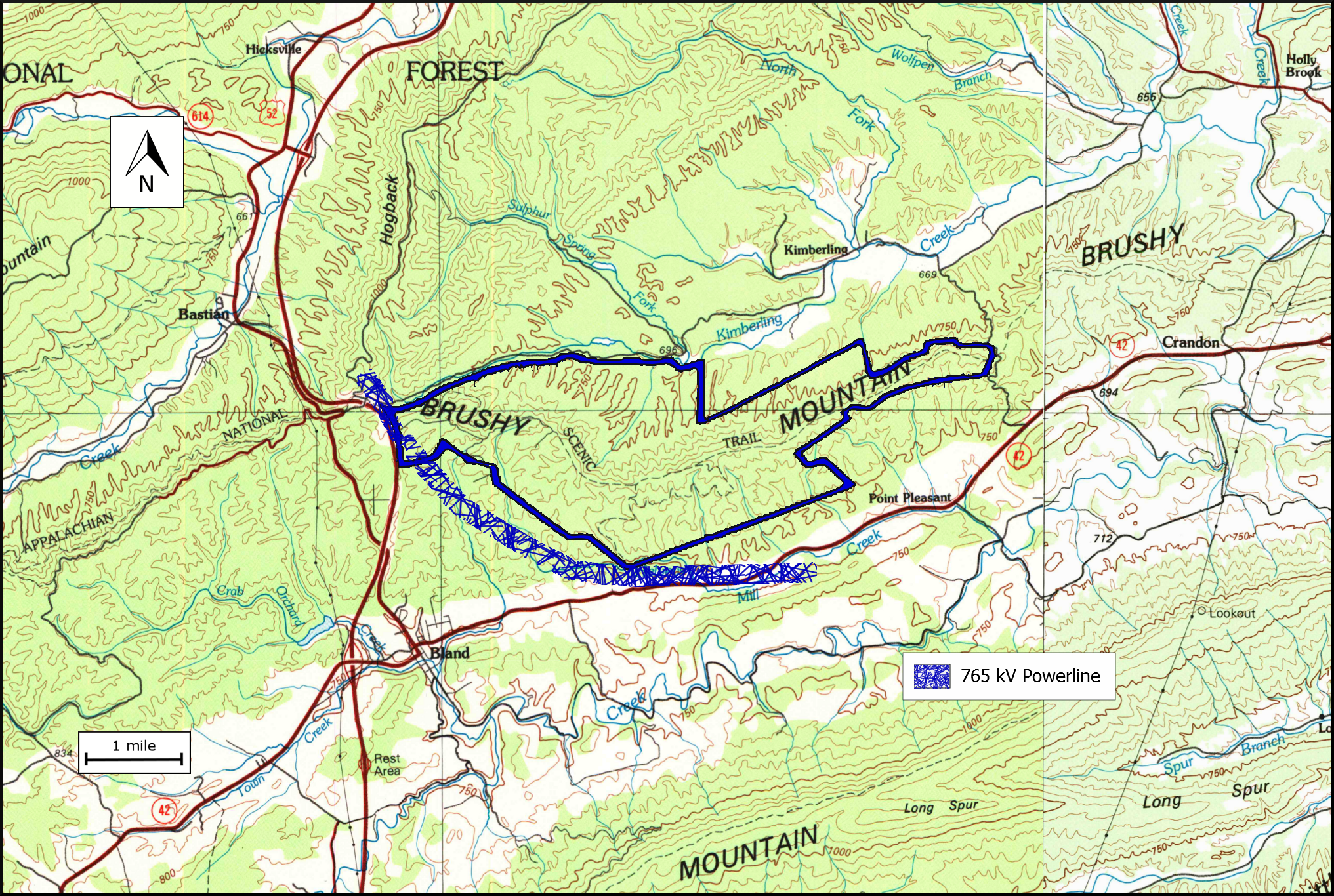
Boundary of the Brushy Mountain wildland as identified by the Wilderness Society

The boundary of the wildland as determined by the Wilderness Society is shown in the adjacent map. Additional roads and trails in the vicinity are given on National Geographic Maps 787 (Blacksburg, New River Valley, Trails Illustrated Hiking Maps, 787). A great variety of information, including topographic maps, aerial views, satellite data and weather information, is obtained by selecting the link with the wild land's coordinates in the upper right of this page.

The Kimberling Creek Wilderness area is just north of the Brushy Mountain wild area.

== Natural history ==
The area is part of the Central Appalachian Broadleaf Coniferous Forest-Meadow Province. Yellow poplar, northern red oak, white oak, basswood, cucumber tree, white ash, eastern hemlock and red maple are found in colluvial drainages, toeslopes and along flood plains of small to medium-sized streams. White oak, northern red oak, and hickory dominate on the north and west, while chestnut oak, scarlet oak and yellow pine are found on ridgetops and exposed sites. There are some stands of table mountain pine, a tree that has become uncommon because it requires fire to reproduce.

The area contains about 430 acres of potential old growth forest.

== Topography ==
The wildland is part of the Ridge and Valley Subsection of the Northern Ridge and Valley Ecosystem Section. Ridges, composed of sandstone and shale, run northeast–southwest, with parallel valleys created from limestone or shale.

Kimberling Creek on the north, and Helveys Mill Creek on the south, are fed by many tributaries with headwaters in the area. Because of low waterflow, Kimberling cannot support a site for sport fishing. Helveys Mill was located in Point Pleasant, a town on VA 42. A spring, near present-day Helveys Mill Shelter on the Appalachian Trail, is one of the sources of the creek used by the mill.

The lowest elevation of 2280 feet is found along Kimberling Creek, and the high elevation of 3250 feet is found at a point on the crest of Brushy Mountain.

== Forest Service management ==
The Forest Service has conducted a survey of their lands to determine the potential for wilderness designation. Wilderness designation provides a high degree of protection from development. The areas that were found suitable are referred to as inventoried roadless areas. Later a Roadless Rule was adopted that limited road construction in these areas. The rule provided some degree of protection by reducing the negative environmental impact of road construction and thus promoting the conservation of roadless areas. Brushy Mountain was inventoried in the roadless area review, and therefore protected from possible road construction and timber sales.

A small part of the area was eliminated by the construction, by American Electric Power, of a 765 kilovolt powerline along the southwestern border, as shown on the map of the area. Environmentalists are concerned about the impact of the power line on forest habitat and wildlife linkages.

The forest service classifies areas under their management by a recreational opportunity setting that informs visitors of the diverse range of opportunities available in the forest. Most of the area is designated "Remote Backcountry-Non-motorized". A small section is designated "Appalachian Trail Corridor".

== Cultural history ==
While the area shows some potential for historical or prehistoric sites, as of 1998 a survey of 167 acres did not find any such sites.

== See also ==
- Kimberling Creek Cluster
