= Bear Creek National Scenic Area =

Protected area in Smyth County, Virginia

- Location within the United States
- Location: Smyth County, Virginia, USA
- Nearest city: Marion, Virginia
- Coordinates: 36.9°N 81.4°W
- Area: 5,503 acres (22.27 km^{2})
- Established: 2009
- Governing body: U.S. Forest Service

Bear Creek National Scenic Area is a federally designated National Scenic Area in Smyth County, Virginia, USA. It was designated as a National Scenic Area through congressional authorization under 16 USC 546b. This legislation established the Bear Creek Scenic Area to protect its scenic quality, water resources, and natural characteristics.

The 5,503-acre (2,227 ha) scenic area is administered by the U.S. Forest Service as part of Jefferson National Forest. Mountains and ridges within the scenic area include Walker Mountain to the north and Brushy Mountain to the south, with the headwaters of Bear Creek in the valley between the ridges. Four miles of the Appalachian Trail run through the scenic area.

The National Scenic Area was established by Public Law 111-11, the Omnibus Public Land Management Act of 2009.

== See also ==
- Natural Atlas
- Crawfish Valley (Bear Creek)
