= Little Walker Mountain (conservation area) =

Protected natural area in Virginia, United States

- Location within Virginia
- Location: Wythe County, Bland County; Pulaski County; Virginia, United States
- Nearest town: Pulaski, Virginia
- Coordinates: 37°4′29″N 80°54′16″W
- Area: 9,815 acres (39.72 km^{2})
- Administrator: U.S. Forest Service

Little Walker Mountain, a wildland in the George Washington and Jefferson National Forests of western Virginia, has been recognized by the Wilderness Society as a special place worthy of protection from logging and road construction. The Wilderness Society has designated the area as a "Mountain Treasure".

The area includes four mountains, a native trout stream and the headwaters of seven major streams, as well as the watershed for the Gatewood Reservoir that provides water for the town of Pulaski.

The area is part of the Walker Mountain Cluster.

== Location and access ==
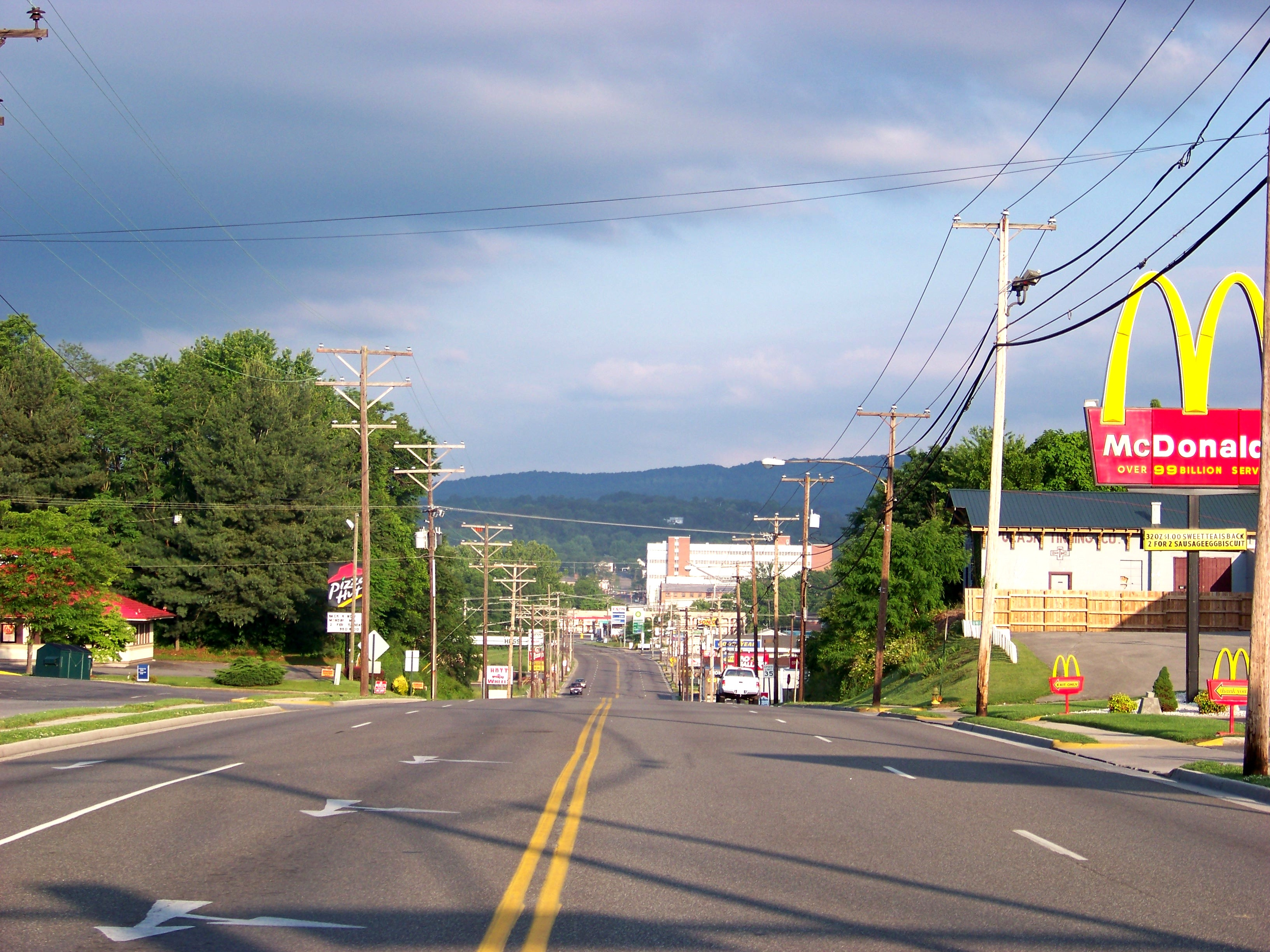
Main Street, Pulaski

The area is located in the Appalachian Mountains of Southwestern Virginia, just north of Interstate 81 and about 3 miles west of Pulaski, Virginia.

In 2011, trails into the area included:

- Tract Fork Trail, 3.9 miles, easy to moderate in difficulty.
  - Directions to trailhead:
    - The western trailhead can be reached from exit 47 on I-77. Go east on Va 717 for 2 miles to the junction with SR 601 and SR 603. Then go east on VA 601 for 10.1 miles, turn right (south) onto SR 600(one-lane, gravel), and go 2.5 miles to reach the western trailhead on the left at the crest of Little Walker Mountain.
    - To reach the eastern trailhead, leave I-81 at exit 94 and go north on VA99 passing through Pulaski where the road becomes SR 738 (Robinson Tract Rd). Continue 4 miles and turn left onto SR 641 (Cox Hollow Rd) and go 3.8 miles to the trailhead. The last part of the route is also called Forest Road 682.
  - Description: From the eastern trailhead, follow upstream along an old wagon road through a forest of white pines, hemlocks, rhododendrons, hardwoods and wildflowers. At one mile there is a junction with the Polecat Trail on the left. The trail crosses into Wythe county at 1.3 miles, ascends a ridge saddle at 2.5 miles where there is a grass area for a good campsite. Pioneers used the old wagon road that leaves the trail. The trail continues to ascend the southern slope of Little Walker Mountain, passing an old road on the left at 3.6 miles and reaches SR 600, the western trailhead, at 4.0 miles.
- Polecat Trail, 1.45 miles, easy to moderate in difficulty.
  - Directions to trailhead: The trailhead can be reached from the south by starting at the I-81/I-77 intersection at Fort Chiswell. Go 3 mile on VA 121 and SR 620 passing through Max Meadows to the junction with SR 712. Turning onto SR 712, go 6 miles, turn onto SR 707 on left and continue for 1.8 miles to the trailhead on the right. Parking is on the left.
  - Description: Following an old railroad grade, the trail crosses a tributary of Peak Creek at 0.6 mile, recrosses the tributary at 0.8 miles to reach a good campsite in a forest of hardwoods and rhododendrons. The trail then climbs a ridge at 1 mile, descends to cross a tributary of Tract Fork to reach the Tract Fork Trail at 1.4 miles. The eastern trailhead for the Tract Fork Trail is 1 mile on the right, and the western trailhead is 3 miles to the left.

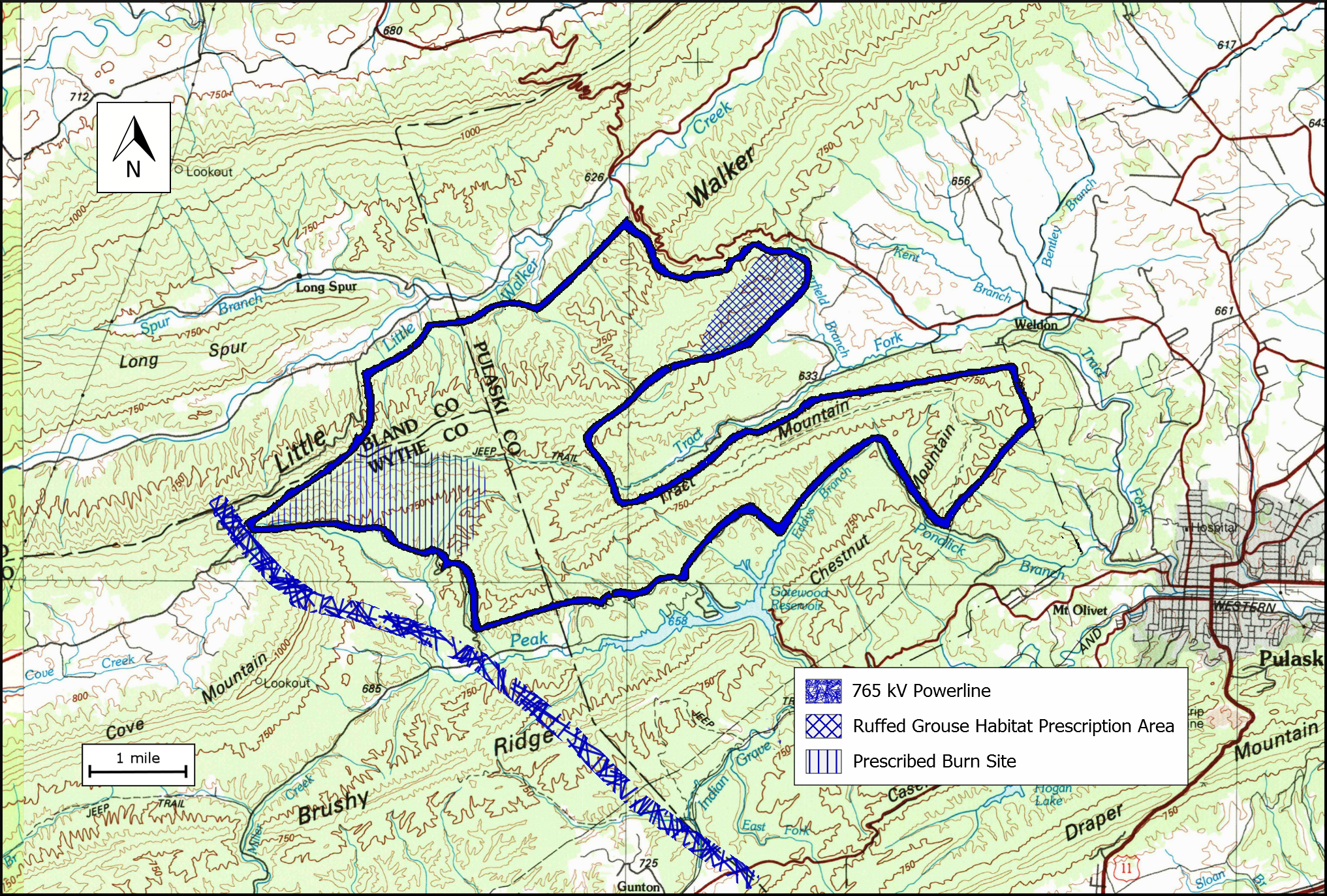
Boundary of the Little Walker Mountain wildland as identified by the Wilderness Society

The boundary of the wildland as determined by the Wilderness Society is shown in the adjacent map. Additional roads and trails are given on National Geographic Maps 787 (Blacksburg, New River Valley, Trails Illustrated Hiking Maps, 787). A great variety of information, including topographic maps, aerial views, satellite data and weather information, is obtained by selecting the link with the wild land's coordinates in the upper right of this page.

Beyond maintained trails, old logging roads can be used to explore the area. The Appalachian Mountains were extensively timbered in the early twentieth century leaving logging roads that are becoming overgrown but still passable. Old logging roads and railroad grades can be located by consulting the historical topographic maps available from the United States Geological Survey (USGS). The Little Walker Mountain wild area is covered by USGS topographic maps Pulaski and Long Spur.

== Natural history ==
The area is part of the Central Appalachian Broadleaf Coniferous Forest-Meadow Province. Yellow poplar, northern red oak, white oak, basswood, cucumber tree, white ash, eastern hemlock and red maple are found in colluvial drainages, toeslopes and along flood plains of small to medium-sized streams. White oak, northern red oak, and hickory dominate on the north and west, while chestnut oak, scarlet oak and yellow pine are found on ridgetops and exposed sites. There are a few stands of table mountain pine, a tree that has become uncommon because it requires fire to reproduce.

A very rare plant, the sword-leaved phlox, is found in the area.

== Topography ==
The wildland is part of the Ridge and Valley Subsection of the Northern Ridge and Valley Ecosystem Section. Ridges, composed of sandstone and shale, run northeast–southwest, with parallel valleys created from limestone or shale. The area includes four mountains, Little Walker, Tract, Piney, and Chestnut, and the headwaters of many streams including Little Walker Creek, Panther Lick Hollow, Laurel Hollow, Tract Fork, Pondlick Branch, Eddys Branch and Peak Creek. The Gatewood reservoir, bordering the area on the south, serves as a water supply for the Town of Pulaski. Tributaries of Peak Creek are part of the watershed for the reservoir.

The lowest elevation of 2080 feet is found near Little Walker Creek, and the high elevation of 3120 feet is found at a point on the crest of Little Walker Mountain.

Streams in Virginia are recognized for their water quality. Wild natural trout streams in Virginia are classified by the Department of Game and Inland Fisheries by their water quality, with class i the highest and class iv the lowest. Tract Fork is rated a class iii streams.

There are many stands of old growth trees, possibly as many as 81 acres. Prescribed fires on the lower parts of Piney Mountain are conducted to encourage the natural reproduction of table mountain pine.

== Forest Service management ==
The Forest Service has conducted a survey of their lands to determine the potential for wilderness designation. Wilderness designation provides a high degree of protection from development. The areas that were found suitable are referred to as inventoried roadless areas. Later a Roadless Rule was adopted that limited road construction in these areas. The rule provided some degree of protection by reducing the negative environmental impact of road construction and thus promoting the conservation of roadless areas. Little Walker Mountain was inventoried in the roadless area review, and therefore protected from possible road construction and timber sales.

American Electric Power has a transmission line outside the area on the southwest.

The forest service classifies areas under their management by a recreational opportunity setting that informs visitors of the diverse range of opportunities available in the forest. A large part of the area is designated "Remote Backcountry-Non-motorized" and "Source Water Protection". A section on the northeast is designated "Ruffed Grouse Habitat" and there are areas designated "Mix of Successional Habitats" and "Old Growth with Disturbance" on small parts of the eastern end.

== Cultural history ==
A survey for cultural resources in a 799-acre parcel of the area found a prehistoric hunting-transient camp. The area is considered of some potential for additional prehistoric and historic sites. Two old homesites south of Forest Road 692 have become overgrown and will eventually decay away.

== See also ==
- Walker Mountain Cluster
