= Cedar Lake (LeFlore County, Oklahoma) =

- Location within Oklahoma Location within the United States
- Location: LeFlore County, Oklahoma
- Coordinates: 34°46′52″N 94°41′49″W
- Type: Reservoir
- River sources: Big Cedar Creek
- Primary outflows: Big Cedar Creek
- Basin countries: United States
- Managing agency: U. S. Forestry Service, part of the U. S. Department of Agriculture (USDA)
- Built: 1937
- Surface area: 86 acres (35 ha)
- Water volume: 1,370 acre⋅ft (1,690,000 m^{3})
- Surface elevation: 900 ft (270 m)
- Settlements: Mena, Arkansas; Heavener, Poteau, and Talihina, Oklahoma

Cedar Lake is in Le Flore County, Oklahoma inside the Ouachita National Forest. Considered a part of Indian Nations National Scenic and Wildlife Area, it is about 12 miles (19 km) south of Heavener, Oklahoma, and 40 miles (64 km) west of Mena, Arkansas.

It is a different body of water from the privately owned Cedar Lake in Canadian County, Oklahoma.

== Description ==
The lake surface covers 86 acres (35 ha). The storage capacity is 1,000 acre-feet (1,200,000 m^{3}). Its earthen dam is 52 feet (16 m) high and 1,000 feet (300 m) long. The maximum storage is 1,370 acre-feet (1,690,000 m^{3}). The elevation is 900 feet (270 m)

Now owned by the U. S. Forest Service, the lake was constructed on Big Cedar Creek in 1937 by the Civilian Conservation Corps for erosion-control purposes. It is primarily used for recreation, and features fishing, boating, picnicking, hiking and camping activities. The lake is open year-round.

== Fishing ==
The lake is regularly stocked with largemouth bass, catfish and bluegill. According to an Oklahoma Department of Wildlife Conservation (ODWC) official, it is known for its big bass potential.

Dale Miller set a state record when he caught a 14 pound 13.7 ounce largemouth bass, having a length of 26 1/8 inches and a girth of 23 inches. ODWC confirmed the record measurement, then released the fish back to the lake. The previous record was held by Benny Williams, Jr., who caught a 14 pound 12 ounce bass from the same lake on March 23, 2012.

== See also ==
- Indian Nations National Wildlife and Scenic Area
