= Seven Sisters (conservation area) =

Protected natural area in Virginia, United States

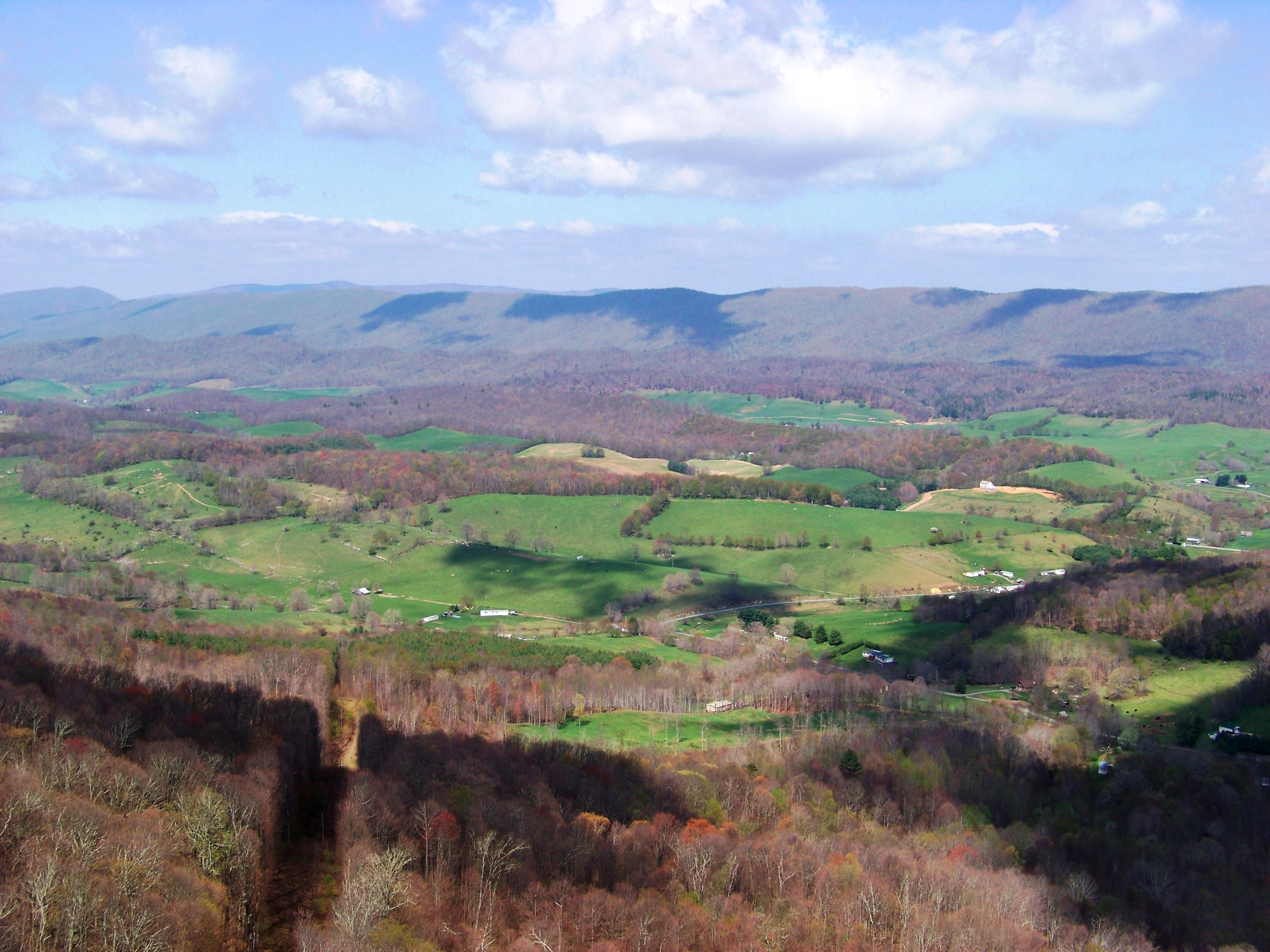
- View from Big Walker Mountain Fire Tower

- Location within Virginia
- Location: Wythe County; Virginia, United States
- Nearest town: Wytheville, Virginia
- Coordinates: 37°0′30″N 81°9′33″W
- Area: 5,300 acres (21 km^{2})
- Administrator: U.S. Forest Service

Seven Sisters, a wildland in the George Washington and Jefferson National Forests of western Virginia, has been recognized by the Wilderness Society as a special place worthy of protection from logging and road construction. The Wilderness Society has designated the area as a "Mountain Treasure".

The Seven sisters Trail, following the crest of Little Walker Mountain, offers good views of nearby Griffith Knob, the Big Bend of Walker Mountain and the Stony Fork Valley.

The area is part of the Walker Mountain Cluster.

== Location and access ==
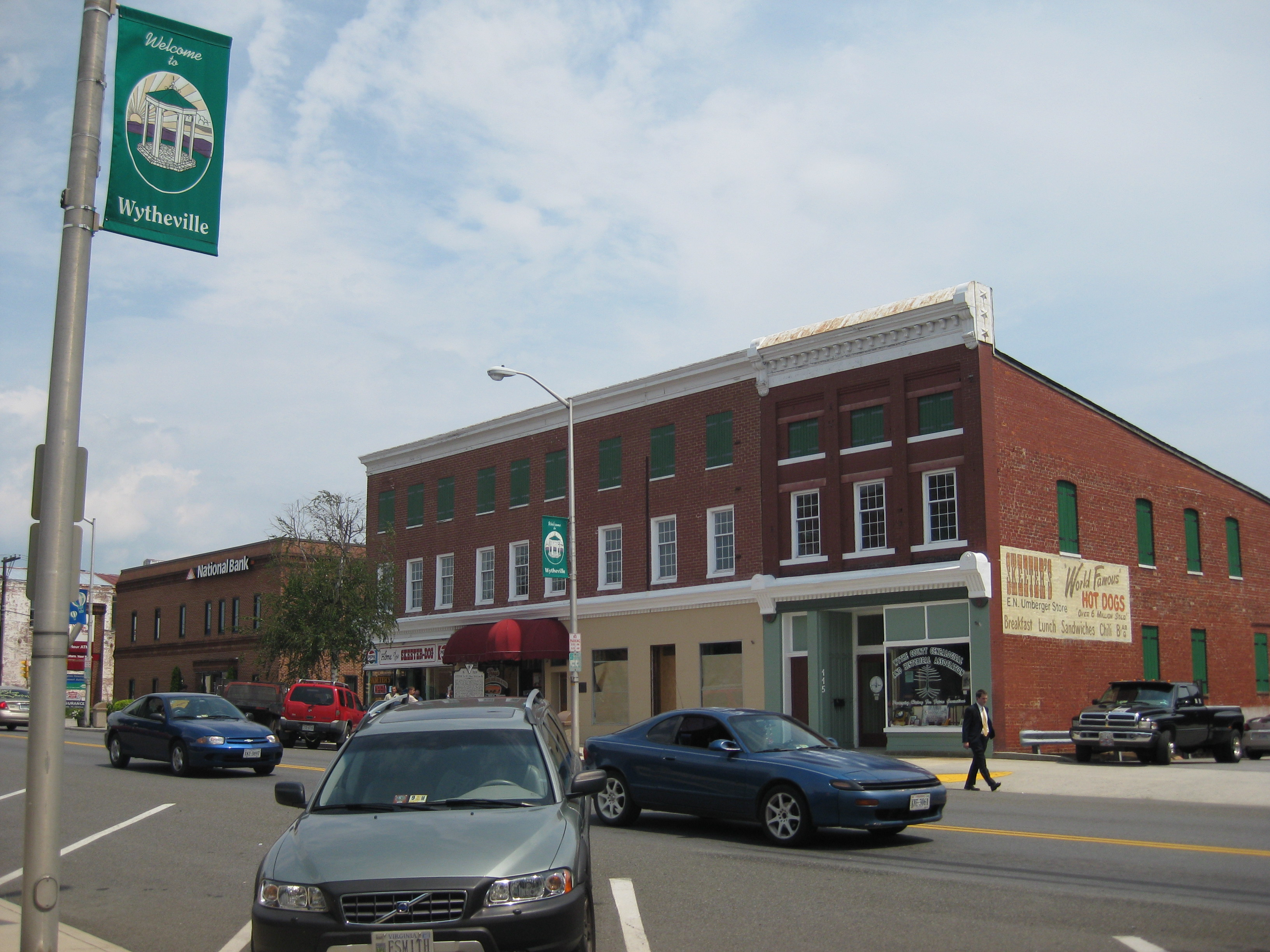
Wytheville, Virginia

The area is in the Appalachian Mountains of Southwestern Virginia, east of adjoining US 52 and about 5 miles north of Wytheville, Virginia. A tunnel on Interstate 77 passes under its northeast corner.

The only trail in the area is Forest Service Trail 6509, the Seven Sisters Trail, a 4.8 mile, yellow-blazed, difficult, hiking-and-mountain-bike trail that climbs from 2500 feet to 3300 feet while passing along seven knobs.

Access to the area is gained from the Stony Creek Campground on the east, near the junction of US 52 and State Route 717. State Route 717, part of the Big Walker Mountain Scenic Byway, passes through the area along the east fork of Stony Creek.

The Big Walker Mountain Scenic Byway can be accessed at either exit 47 or exit 52 from Interstate 77. Starting from the access at exit 47 on VA 717, points along the way include:

- 1.1 mile, access to Stony Fork Creek road
- 1.25 mile, eastern trailhead of Seven Sisters Trail, on left
- 1.5 mile, Astin homesite, access to Stony Fork Creek
- 3.8 miles, Stony Fork Campground, Stony Fork Creek, Stony Fork Nature Trail, Seven Sisters Trail
- 4.3 miles, junction with US 52, turn right
- 7.8 miles, Big Walker Lookout, and access, on right, to 4 mile road leading to Big Bend Picnic Area
- 12.7 miles, access road to Appalachian Trail, on left
- 12.8 miles, picnic table, on right
- 15.6 miles, end of byway at I-77, exit 52.

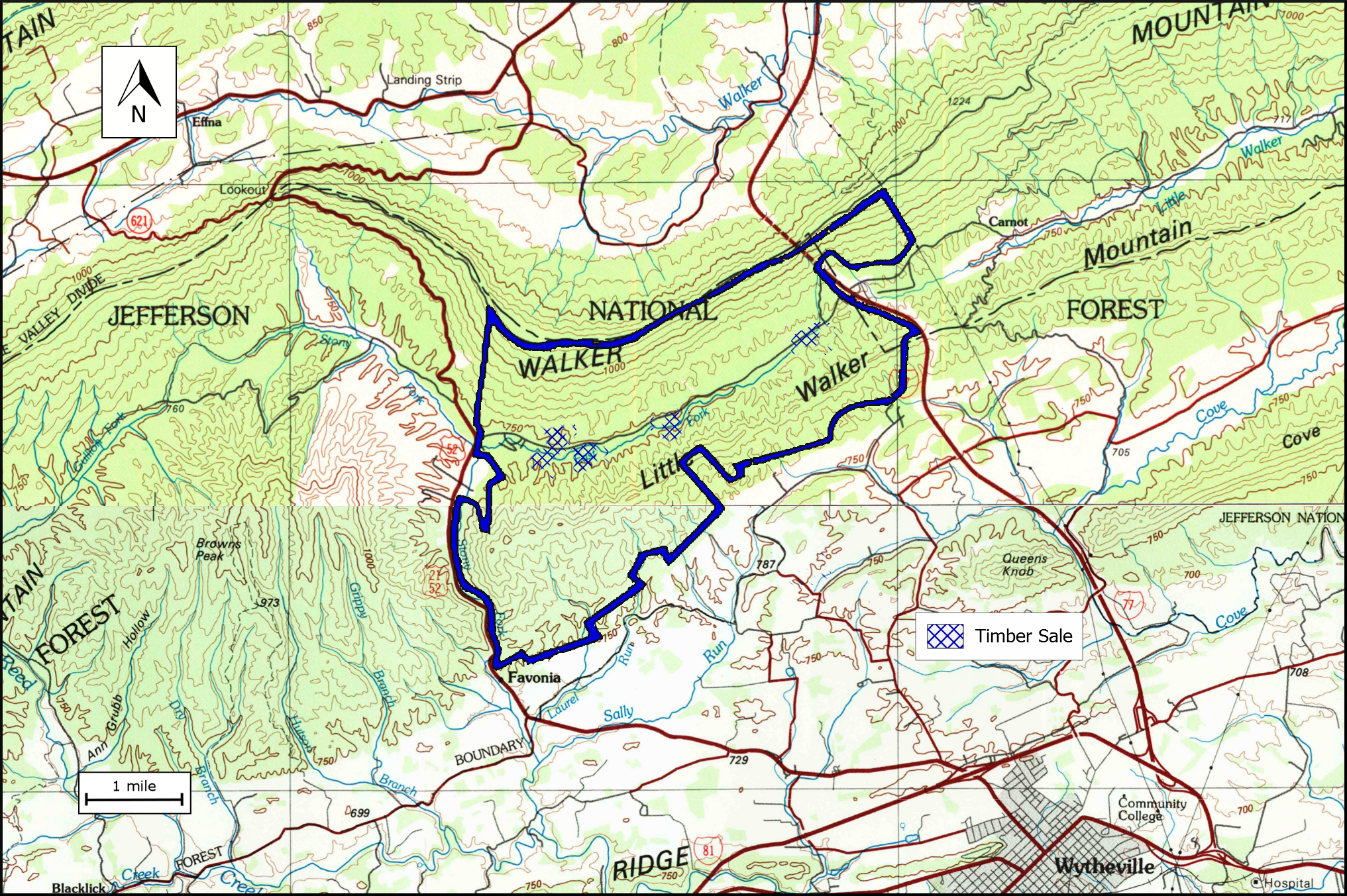
Boundary of the Seven Sisters wildland as identified by the Wilderness Society

The boundary of the wildland as determined by the Wilderness Society is shown in the adjacent map that can be expanded by selecting the icon below the map on the right. Additional roads and trails are given on National Geographic Maps 787 (Blacksburg, New River Valley, Trails Illustrated Hiking Maps, 787). A great variety of information, including topographic maps, aerial views, satellite data and weather information, is obtained by selecting the link with the wild land's coordinates in the upper right of this page.

Additional foot access can be gained using old logging roads. The Appalachian Mountains were extensively timbered in the early twentieth century leaving logging roads that are becoming overgrown but still passable. Old logging roads and railroad grades can be located by consulting the historical topographic maps available from the United States Geological Survey (USGS). The Seven Sisters wild area is covered by USGS topographic maps Big Bend, Bland and Crockett.

== Natural history ==
The area is part of the Central Appalachian Broadleaf Coniferous Forest-Meadow Province.

By providing a land bridge for a wildlife crossing, the tunnel for I-77 eliminates the impact of habitat fragmentation on wildlife that want to cross the interstate.

Forest Service records indicate that there are several areas of old growth forest north of VA 717.

== Topography ==
The wildland is part of the Ridge and Valley Subsection of the Northern Ridge and Valley Ecosystem Section. Ridges, composed of sandstone and shale, run northeast–southwest, with parallel valleys created from limestone or shale.

The area includes the watershed of upper East Fork Stony Fork between Walker Mountain on the north and Little Walker Mountain on the south. Stony Creek is a tributary of Reed Creek which flows into the New River near Wytheville.

Big Bend is a 3868-foot, rugged and scenic point on Walker Mountain.

== Forest Service management ==
The Forest Service has conducted a survey of their lands to determine the potential for wilderness designation. Wilderness designation provides a high degree of protection from development. The areas that were found suitable are referred to as inventoried roadless areas. Later a Roadless Rule was adopted that limited road construction in these areas. The rule provided some degree of protection by reducing the negative environmental impact of road construction and thus promoting the conservation of roadless areas. Seven Sisters was not inventoried in the roadless area review, and therefore not protected from possible road construction and timber sales.

The forest service classifies areas under their management by a recreational opportunity setting that informs visitors of the diverse range of opportunities available in the forest. The southern part of the area is designated "Maintenance/Restoration of Forest Communities", sections near Rt. 52, I-77 and Va 727 are "Scenic Corridor", the slope of Walker Mountain is "Dispersed Recreation – Suitable" with small tracts of "Old Growth with Disturbance".

There have been proposals for wind turbines between Rt. 52 and I-77 near the area.

The Forest Service has logged at least 55 acres near the Stony Fork Campground and there has been some prescribed burning.

While the Stony Creek Camground remains open, some facilities have been reduced in operation. The Dark Horse Hollow picnic area on the southwest has been closed and the Big Bend picnic area has become an overlook.

There has been some vandalism at the shooting range near the Stony Creek Campground, and unauthorized use of motorized vehicles beyond the gate at the Big Bend area to access Rt. 206.

== See also ==
- Walker Mountain Cluster
- Seven Sisters Trail
