= Kimberling Creek Cluster =

Protected natural area in Virginia, United States

- Location within Virginia Location within the United States
- Location: Bland, Virginia, United States
- Nearest town: Bastian, Virginia
- Coordinates: 37°9′58″N 81°5′43″W
- Administrator: U.S. Forest Service

The Kimberling Creek Cluster is a region in the Jefferson National Forest recognized by The Wilderness Society for its diversity of habitats extending along parts of Brushy and Hogback Mountains. Kimberling Creek, with headwaters in the cluster, flows into Big Walker Creek, a tributary of the New River.

== Description ==
The Kimberling Creek Cluster contains wild areas that are worthy of protection from logging and road construction. These include areas with different levels of protection. One is recognized as a “Mountain Treasure” by the Wilderness Society and the other is a wilderness protected by law.

The areas in the cluster are:

- Brushy Mountain (conservation area)
- Kimberling Creek Wilderness

Nearby wild areas:

- Walker Mountain Cluster
- Garden Mountain Cluster
- Angels Rest Cluster

== Location and access ==
The cluster is east of Interstate I-77, about five miles north of Bland, Virginia and three miles east of Bastian, Virginia. There are many roads giving access to the area. Roads and trails in the cluster are shown on National Geographic Map 787 (Blacksburg, New River Valley). The map also gives trail information. A great variety of information, including topographic maps, aerial views, satellite data and weather information, is obtained by selecting the link with the wild land’s coordinates in the upper right of this page.

== Biological significance ==
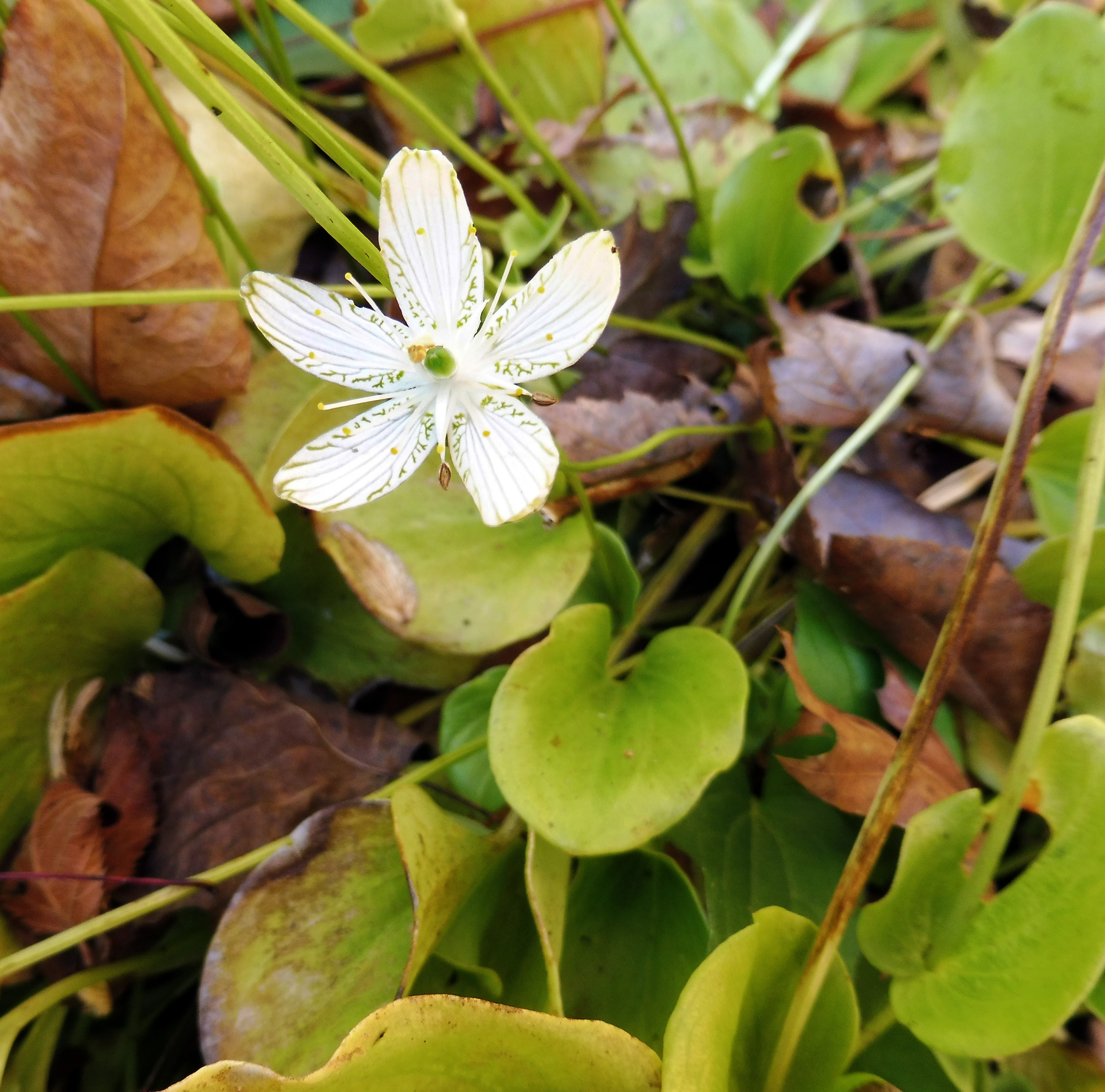
Large-leaved grass-of-parnassus

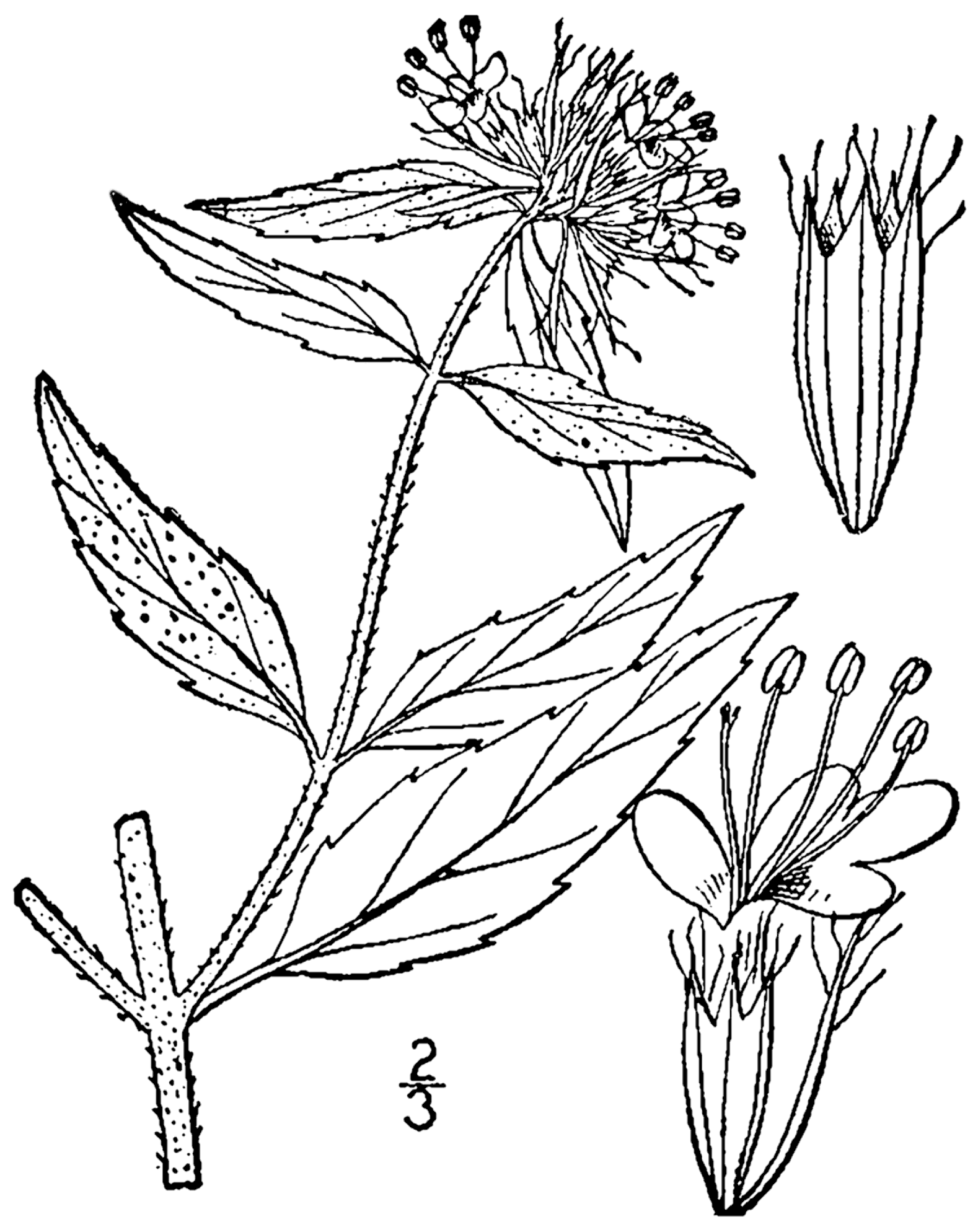
Basil Mountainmint

The land form, climate, soils and geology of the Appalachian highlands, as well as its evolutionary history, have created one of the most diverse collections of plants and animals in the deciduous forests of the temperate world. The cluster's large tract of land supports species, such as black bear and some bird species, that require extensive tracts of unbroken forest for survival.

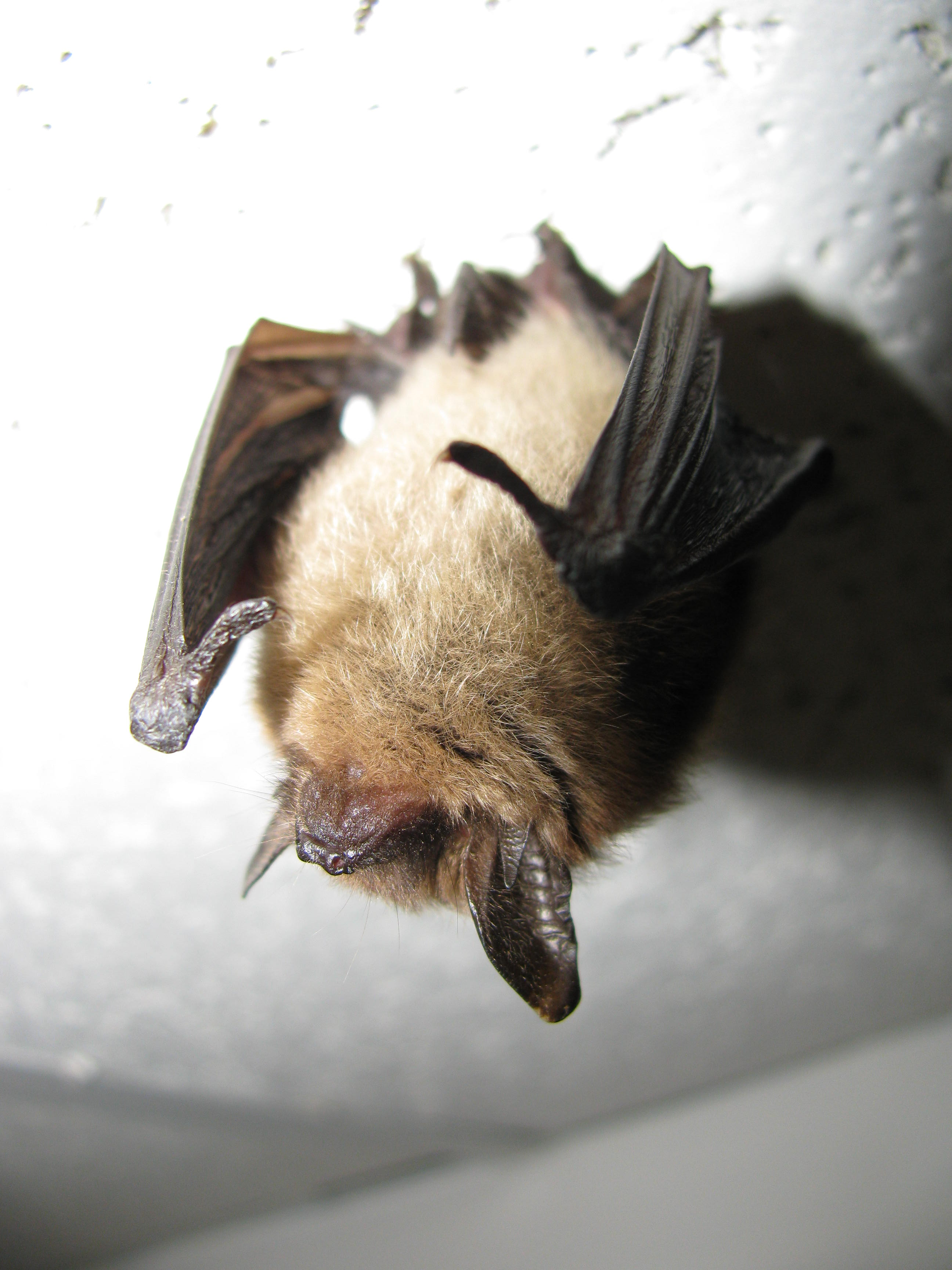
Northern long-eared Myotis

The cluster provides habitat for species that are critically imperiled, imperiled or vulnerable, as indicated by their NatureServe conservation status. Among these are:

- a beetle, the Hoffman’s Cave Beetle;
- a millipede, the Hoffman’s Cleidogonid Millipede;
- two fish, the Tennessee Dace and the Candy Darter;
- three mammals, the Virginia Bigeared Bat, the Northern long-eared Myotis, and the Indiana Bat;
- a cave, the Significant Cave;
- three terrestrial natural communities, the Appalachian Xeric Pine Outcrop Woodland, the Central Appalachian Xeric Chestnut Oak-Virginia Pine Woodland and the Central Appalachian Montane Oak-Hickory forest (Rich Type); and
- seven vascular plants, Piratebush, Box Huckleberry, Large-leaved grass-of-parnassus, Bog Bluegrass, Tennessee Pondweed, Basil Mountainmint, and Torrey’s Mountainmint.

== Geologic history ==
The cluster is in the Ridge and Valley Province that extends along the western boundary of Virginia. The Ridge and Valley province is composed of long, relatively level-crested, ridges with highest elevations reaching over 3600 feet. The province marks the eastern boundary in the Paleozoic era of an older land surface on the east. It was uplifted and eroded during the Paleozoic with extensive folding and thrust-faulting. Resistant quartzite, conglomerates and sandstones form the ridge caps while less resistant shales and limestones eroded to form the intervening valleys. The province is part of the Appalachian Mountains.

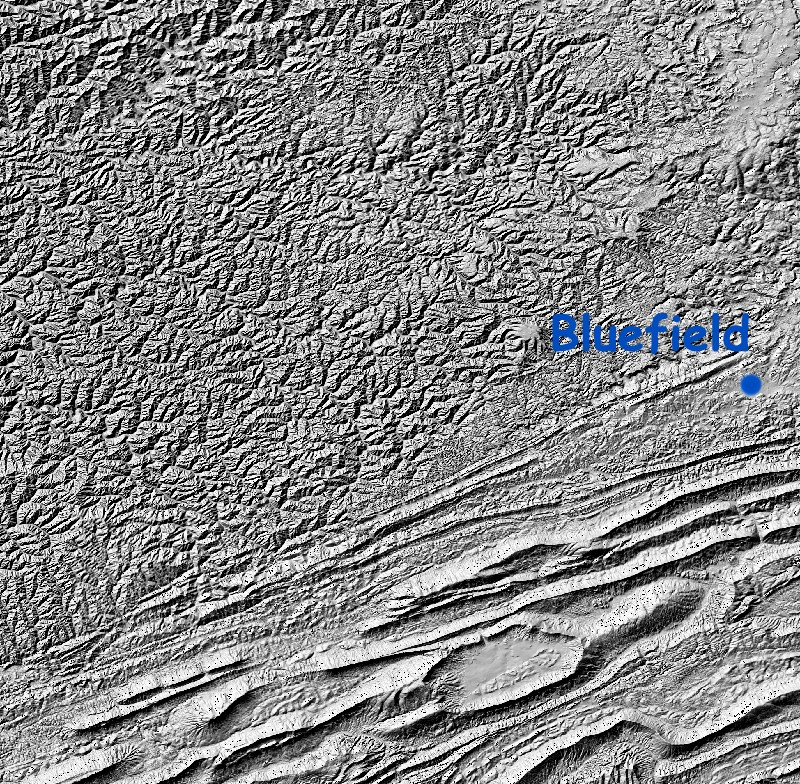
Satellite View of Ridge and Valley System

The brothers William B. and Henry D. Rogers showed, in 1847, that the ridge and valley system in the western part of the Appalachians was caused by erosion of large anticlines and synclines. Similar folds exist in almost all mountain chains, but nowhere as pronounced as in this area of the Appalachians. A system of parallel anticlines and synclines has become known as an “Appalachian Structure”.

Brushy Mountain and Hogback Mountain are principal ridges in the cluster. Brushy Mountain, one of the broad ridges composing the Ridge and Valley formation, is capped by Mississippian Price sandstone. Hogback Mountain is another ridge running parallel to Brushy Mountain on the west.

== Cultural history ==
The name Kimberling probably comes from several Kimberling families who were early settlers in the area. The town of Kimberling, surrounded by the cluster, was the site of a hotel built by Edwin S. Booth. A resort, Kimberling Springs, featuring springwater believed to have medicinal value, closed in 1880.

Bland, the seat of Bland county, was a remote town serving as the area’s legal and business center when it was incorporated in 1872 under the name of “Seldon”. James Seldon was a member of the US House of Representatives in the 1840s. The name Bland recognizes Richard Bland, a delegate to the General Congress in Philadelphia, called “the wisest man south of the James river” by Thomas Jefferson.

Bastian, on the west of the cluster at the crossroad of US-52 and VA615, was named after F. E. Bastian who assisted in the establishment of the local lumber industry in the 1920s. The Wolf Creek Indian Village and Museum, located in Bastian, recreates an authentic Native American village discovered during the construction of I-77 and excavated by state archeologist Howard a. MacCord, Sr. It is owned and operated by Bland County.

== Other clusters ==
Other clusters of the Wilderness Society's "Mountain Treasures" in the Jefferson National Forest (north to south):

- Glenwood Cluster
- Craig Creek Cluster
- Barbours Creek-Shawvers Run Cluster
- Sinking Creek Valley Cluster
- Mountain Lake Wilderness Cluster
- Angels Rest Cluster
- Walker Mountain Cluster
- Garden Mountain Cluster
- Mount Rogers Cluster
- Clinch Ranger District Cluster
