= St. Helena Island Light =

Lighthouse in Michigan, United States

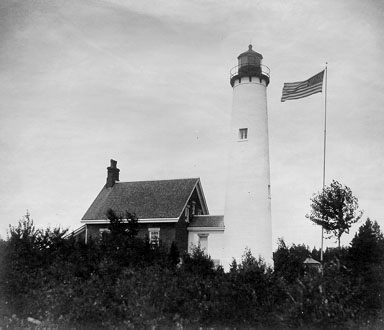
- Undated USCG photo
- Location: St. Helena Island, Moran Township, Mackinac County, Michigan
- Coordinates: 45°51′18″N 84°51′48″W

Tower
- Constructed: 1873
- Foundation: limestone
- Construction: brick
- Automated: 1922
- Height: 63 feet (19 m)
- Shape: frustum of a cone with attached cottage
- Markings: white w/white lantern
- Heritage: National Register of Historic Places listed place

Light
- First lit: 1873
- Focal height: 71 feet (22 m)
- Lens: 3 1/2-order Fresnel lens (original), 12-inch (300 mm) ML-300 Tideland Signal acrylic (current)
- Range: 6 nautical miles (11 km; 6.9 mi)
- Characteristic: Fl W 6s
- St. Helena Island Light Station
- U.S. National Register of Historic Places
- U.S. Historic district
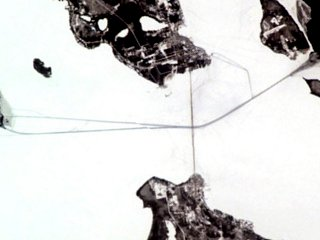
- St. Helena Island stands out from an icy background in the northwest quadrant of this wintertime aerial photograph.
- Nearest city: St. Ignace, Michigan
- Area: 0.9 acres (0.36 ha)
- NRHP reference No.: 88000442
- Added to NRHP: April 27, 1988

The buildings of the St Helena Light complex are the sole surviving structures on St. Helena Island, in Mackinac County in the U.S. state of Michigan. The lighthouse on the St. Helena Island's southeastern point was built in 1872-1873 and went into operation in September 1873. It became one of a series of lighthouses that guided vessels through the Straits of Mackinac, past a dangerous shoal that extends from the island.

== History ==
St. Helena Island, which is 240 acres (97 ha) in size, is located offshore from Gros Cap, Michigan, 10 miles (16 km) west of Mackinac Island in the Lake Michigan approach to the Straits of Mackinac. The island has a natural harbor on its north shore, which provided shelter for both Native Americans and voyageurs, who sought shelter from fierce, foreseeable and notorious southwesterly storms, which would drive waves that gained strength running with the lake's length.

During the Civil War years, it became increasingly apparent that a shoal near St. Helena Island menaced maritime traffic through the Straits of Mackinac. At the urging of the United States Lighthouse Board, Congress appropriated $14,000 in 1872 for a lighthouse to be built of limestone and brick on this location and fitted with a 3.5-order Fresnel lens. This work created the St. Helena Island Light. This Light became part of what would be a complex of 14 reef lights distributed throughout the shoals and hazardous points of the Straits of Mackinac. This essential Light was staffed by either one or two lighthouse keepers from its initial operation in 1873 until 1922. A complex of buildings was constructed around the lighthouse to support its operation, including keepers' dwellings, a boat dock, and a boathouse.

This was the first Michigan lighthouse to lose its keeper. In 1922, the lighthouse was automated. The tower was fitted with a tank of acetylene gas, a pilot light, and the "sun valve" recently invented by Nobel Prize-winning engineer Gustav Dalén. When the sun set, the temperature would drop slightly, causing the valve to open and acetylene to be released against the pilot flame. The light would then relight itself and shine throughout the night. With the sunrise the next morning, the valve would close. The St. Helena Island Light innovation was successful, and in the years after 1922, many other Michigan lighthouses would be refitted with sun valves.

== Current status ==
The light is an active aid to navigation and is used for maritime heritage education. It is managed by the Great Lakes Lighthouse Keepers Association, which has a thirty-year lease, but the Coast Guard maintains the optic.

After the St. Helena lighthouse complex was de-staffed and the civilian fishing station became a ghost settlement, evidence of human presence on the island began to structurally deteriorate. Wreckers, vandals, and plunderers imposed significant damage upon the light tower and adjacent structures. The U.S. Coast Guard, the lighthouse's last federal operator, viewed the remains as "attractive nuisances" for which they bore continuing legal liability. They recommended in 1980 that the lighthouse complex be razed. Due to a lack of demolition funds, the recommendation was not implemented. However, early in the 1980s, the assistant keeper's dwelling and boathouse were levelled.

This recommendation was not implemented and the Great Lakes Lighthouse Keepers Association (GLLKA) assumed ownership of the property and commenced restoration efforts in 1986 with the help of Boy Scouts of America Troop 4 from Ann Arbor, Michigan. The rehabilitation effort was significant, with an estimated 900 cubic yards (690 m^{3}) of debris requiring removal. As of 2008, the GLLKA planned to continue restoring the lighthouse complex to its appearance in 1900. Possible future St. Helena goals include the construction of an unmanned visitor center on the island to educate visiting yachtsmen. Restoration efforts are tied to similar activity on neighboring Round Island Light (Michigan). The sale was made under the terms of the National Historic Lighthouse Preservation Act.

The Coast Guard transferred the lighthouse complex and reservation to the GLLKA in 1997 via legislative transfer, on condition that the GLLKA continue to allow the Coast Guard to operate the light. A light continues to operate to this day with a 9.8-inch (250 mm) acrylic lens, the original Fresnel lens having disappeared. The remainder of St. Helena Island, outside the lighthouse reservation, was purchased by the Little Traverse Conservancy in September 2001.

The light's restoration has won numerous state national, and state historic preservation awards. These include Keep Michigan Beautiful Award, Mid-West Living Hometown Pride Award, Take Pride in America Award and United States President George H. W. Bush’s 630th Point of Light Award in the "Thousand points of light" program. The lighthouse was added to the National Register of Historic Places in 1988. It is Mackinac County listing #88000442. The light is also known as St. Helena Lighthouse and the St. Helene Lighthouse.

St. Helena Island Light is one of 149 lighthouses in Michigan. Michigan has more lighthouses than any other state.

Boy Scouts from Troop 4 still visit the island every year in mid-June to continue renovations to the light station.

== Viewing the lighthouse ==
The St. Helena Lighthouse can be seen from numerous points on the Michigan mainland, including a lake shore highway rest area on US 2 at Gros Cap, Michigan 6 miles (9.7 km) west of St. Ignace, Michigan. The Great Lakes Lighthouse Keepers Association annually organizes work crews for this light and often arranges tours that travel from Mackinaw City to the island. These tours are not handicap accessible due to the shallow water near the light. It is necessary to transfer from the tour boat to an Inflatable boat and then climb up on the dock from the rubber boat. Because of its picturesque color and form, and its location near Mackinac Island and the Mackinac Bridge, it is often the subject of photographs. Even needlepoint illustrations have been created.

A private boat is, of course, the best way to see this light close up. Short of that, Shepler's Ferry Service out of Mackinaw City offers periodic lighthouse tours in the summer season. Its "Westbound Tour" includes passes by St. Helena Island Light and even offers a luncheon. Schedules and rates are available from Shepler's.

An alternative is to charter a seaplane to tour the lights in the straits.
