= St. Helena Island (Michigan) =

Island in Michigan, United States

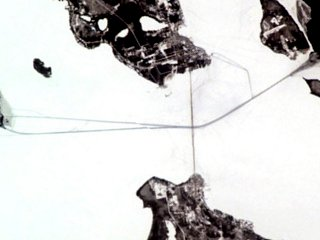
- St. Helena Island stands out from an icy background in the northwest quadrant of this wintertime aerial photograph.

- Location within Michigan Location within the United States

Geography
- Location: Moran Township, Mackinac County, Michigan
- Coordinates: 45.860°N 84.872°W
- Adjacent to: Lake Michigan
- Area: 240 acres (97 ha)
- Highest elevation: 600 ft (180 m)

Administration
- United States

St. Helena Island is an uninhabited 240 acres (97 ha) island in the Lake Michigan approach to the Straits of Mackinac. The island is located offshore from Gros Cap, Michigan, 10 miles (16 km) west of Mackinac Island in Mackinac County in the U.S. state of Michigan.

== History and description ==
From the standpoint of the Great Lakes, the most important fact about St. Helena Island are the shoal waters that extend outward from the small island's southeasternmost point. A hazard to navigation, the shoal inspired the 1873 construction of a 63 feet (19 m) lighthouse and tower. The St. Helena Island Light not only warned boaters away from the shoal, but also guided eastbound vessels toward the narrow Straits of Mackinac. The light station, which now constitutes the island's only remaining constructed buildings, remains as an active aid to navigation as of 2022.

By contrast, the island's north shore has a natural (albeit shallow) harbor on its north shore. Historically, this embayment provided shelter for both Native Americans and voyageurs, who sought shelter from fierce, foreseeable and notorious southwesterly storms, which would drive waves that gained strength running with the lake's length.

== Fishing station ==
The cold but shallow waters around St. Helena Island create fertile grounds for schools of lake trout and whitefish. During the 1800s, a fishing station operated adjacent to the island harbor. A fishing station, a self-contained community vernacular to the culture of the Upper Great Lakes, was a logistical depot for professional fishermen during the century prior to the development of motorboats and refrigeration. Freshly caught fish from the waters of northeastern Lake Michigan adjacent to St. Helena Island would be rushed by oar or sail back to the fishing station for preservation in salt. Salt fish could be stored and transported in barrels as an exportable commodity.

Fisherfolk from St. Helena are identified as part of the mob that carried out an ethnic cleansing operation on nearby Beaver Island in 1856. The operation was part of a network of events intended to establish overall Mackinac Island control over the fishing grounds of northern Lake Michigan. Long successful, this control failed during the early decades of the 20th century. The invention of electrical refrigeration and powered fishing boats made widely distributed fishing stations unnecessary. Local fish could be carried to larger nearby port towns such as Mackinaw City, Michigan or St. Ignace, Michigan. The St. Helena Island fishing station became a ghost town, and the former light station was extensively vandalized.

== Current status ==
The Great Lakes Lighthouse Keepers Association (GLLKA) is continuing its efforts to restore the light station, including the Island dock and light station outbuildings. The GLLKA raises funds for this purpose, including limited opportunities for individuals and groups to visit the Island and enjoy its history and natural identity.

Scouting America Troop 4, from Ann Arbor, Michigan have performed extensive renovations and repairs to the light house station as their summer service project. The troop has been volunteering on the island since 1989. As of June-2024 there are more than 30 Eagle Scout Projects from Troop 4 on the island. The Island currently serves as a refuge and breeding ground for fish-eating birds, such as the osprey and great blue heron.
