= Stone Mountain Wilderness =

Wilderness area in Virginia, United States

- IUCN category Ib (wilderness area)
- Location within Virginia
- Location: Virginia, U.S.
- Nearest city: Bundy, Virginia
- Coordinates: 36.81408°N 82.92309°W
- Area: 3,273 acres (13.25 km^{2})
- Established: 2009
- Governing body: U.S. Forest Service

Stone Mountain Wilderness is a U.S. wilderness area in the Clinch Ranger District of the George Washington and Jefferson National Forests. It is a small tract of land in western Virginia, consisting of an area of 3,273 acres (13.25 km^{2}) next to the banks of the Powell River. It was designated as wilderness area in 2009 by Omnibus Public Land Management Act of 2009.

On a ridge between the Powell River and the North Fork of the Powell River with deep gorges, sheer cliffs, rocky outcrops, dense woods and rhododendron, the wilderness is far removed from the throngs of outdoor adventurers. There are good views across the Powell river to Powell Mountain from an old tower site on Stone Mountain. This is the only protected wilderness in the Cumberland Mountains.

The wilderness is part of the Clinch Ranger District Cluster.

== Location and access ==
The wilderness is a few miles south of Bundy in Lee County, Virginia. It is bounded on the north by the North Fork of the Powell River; Stone Mountain is on the south side of the wilderness.

There are two trails in the area. The Stone Mountain Trail (Forest Trail 207) begins at Cave Spring Campground and is 6.7 miles long in the wilderness, but extends northeast beyond the wilderness boundary. The Payne Branch Trail (Forest Trail 213) begins at Sigma and is 1.8 miles long.

== Natural history ==
The forest, largely undisturbed because the rough terrain makes access difficult, contains tulip poplar, red maple, black cherry, yellow birch, frazier magnolia, oaks and hickories. Habitats include rhododendron thickets, ponds, stony creeks, deep gorges, sheer cliffs and rocky outcrops.

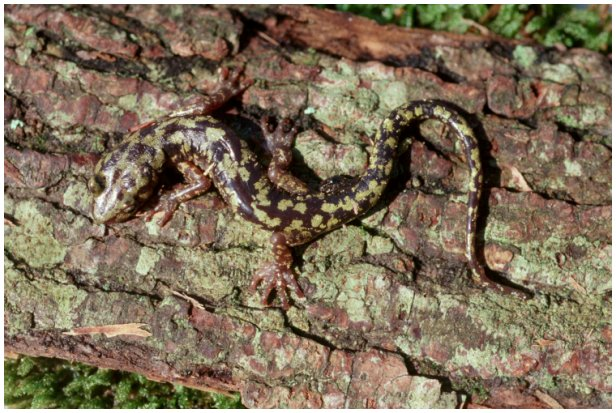
Green Salamander Aneides aeneus 1a

The wilderness provides watershed for Cave Springs Cave, which is just outside the wilderness on the south. The cave, a winter roosting site for several species of bats, has a gate at the entrance to prevent disturbance of the bats and minimize exposure to White-nose syndrome, a disease that has decimated the bat population in eastern North America.

Two rare salamanders are found in the wilderness, the green salamander and the Cumberland Plateau salamander.

The wilderness is within the watershed of both the Powell River and the North Fork of the Powell River. The North Fork of the Powell River contains 29 species of mussels and 19 species of rare fish. The Powell River contains three federally endangered mussels; the oyster mussel, the Cumberlandian combshell and the rough rabbits foot.

== Topography ==
The wilderness is in the Appalachian Plateau, sometimes called the Allegheny Plateau. The Appalachian Plateau has mountains with broad, flat summits composed of resistant sandstones and conglomerates with seams of coal. Outcrops of shales and limestones are seen on the side slopes.

Stone Mountain is part of the Cumberland Mountains complex, lying on its eastern end. Little Stone Mountain, outside of the wilderness, is part of the mountain complex as it extends further east. The southeast side of the mountain ridge falls off rapidly with large cliffs and rock outcrops. The other side of the ridge on the northwest falls off slowly with streams, originating in springs and seeps near the crest, flowing into the North Fork of the Powell River. The streams include Low Gap Branch, Flanary Branch, McConnell Branch, Mill Branch, Payne Branch and Laurel Branch.

The Stone Mountain Wilderness in Virginia has varying elevations, with the highest point reaching over 3,120 feet (951+ meters). The wilderness area is characterized by a steep south-facing scarp that provides an outstanding view from an elevation of 3,060 feet at the old Olinger Fire Tower site. Elevations range from about 2000 feet along the North Fork of the Pound on the western boundary to 3000 feet on the ridge top. This diverse elevation contributes to the rich biodiversity and scenic beauty of the area.

== Management ==
The wilderness is managed by the Forest Service. There are some regulations to maintain the integrity of the area as a wilderness. For example, motorized equipment, motor vehicles and mountain bikes are prohibited, group size is limited to ten people, and limits are placed on camping.

== Nearby Wild Areas ==
- Little Laurel Branch
- North Fork of the Pound
- Roaring Branch
- Little Stony Creek
- Devils Fork (conservation area)
- Laurel Fork (conservation area)

== See also ==
- List of U.S. Wilderness Areas
- Clinch Ranger District Cluster
