= Mill Creek (conservation area) =

Protected natural area in Virginia, United States

- Location within Virginia
- Location: Giles County, Virginia; Virginia, United States
- Nearest town: Pearisburg, Virginia
- Coordinates: 37°17′42″N 80°47′51″W
- Area: 4,777 acres (19.33 km^{2})
- Administrator: U.S. Forest Service

Mill Creek, a wildland in the George Washington and Jefferson National Forests of western Virginia, has been recognized by the Wilderness Society as a special place worthy of protection from logging and road construction. The Wilderness Society has designated the area as a "Mountain Treasure".

The area, a valley between two mountain ridges with many cliffs, rocky outcrops and an almost impenetrable vegetation, has the sense of being isolated from the civilized world although it is not far from nearby towns. Several trails give access to the area.

The area is part of the Angels Rest Cluster.

== Location and access ==
The area is located in the Appalachian Mountains of Southwestern Virginia, about 1 mile southwest of Pearisburg, Virginia and 1 mile south of Narrows, Virginia. Mill Creek runs through a valley formed between Pearis Mountain and Wolf Creek Mountain. The Appalachian Trail crosses the southeast side of the area for eight miles as it travels south from Pearisburg/. Docs Knob Shelter is at the southwest border where the Appalachian Trail leaves the area. A system of trails on the northeast can be accessed from the town of Narrows.

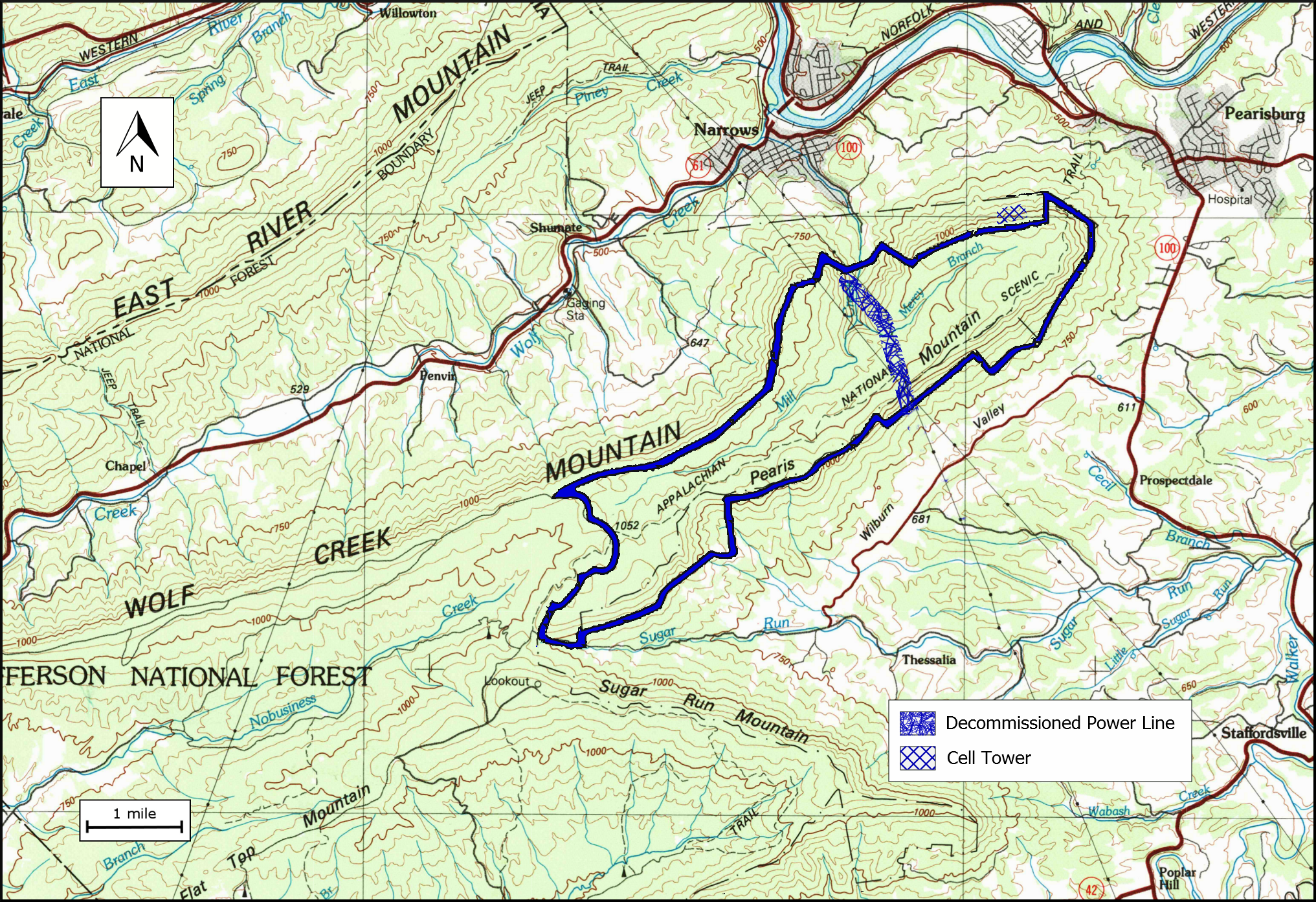
Boundary of the Mill Creek wild area as identified by the Wilderness Society

The boundary of the wildland, as determined by the Wilderness Society, is shown in the adjacent map. The map can be enlarged by selecting the icon in the lower right. Roads in the area can be found on National Geographic Map 787 (Blacksburg, New River Valley). A great variety of information, including topographic maps, aerial views, satellite data and weather information, is obtained by selecting the link with the wild land's coordinates in the upper right of this page.

Beyond maintained trails, old logging roads can be used to explore the area. The Appalachian Mountains were extensively timbered in the early twentieth century leaving logging roads that are becoming overgrown but still passable. Old logging roads and railroad grades can be located by consulting the historical topographic maps available from the United States Geological Survey (USGS). The Mill Creek wild area is covered by USGS topographic maps Narrows and Pearisburg.

== Natural history ==
The area is within the Ridge and Valley Subsection of the Northern Ridge and Valley Section in the Central Appalachian Broadleaf Coniferous Forest-Meadow Province. Mercy Branch, a stream on the northeast, is in a special management area. In the spring, the dense growth of rhododendrons and azaleas give a striking display of wild flowers.

Streams in the area have been recognized for their high water quality. Wild natural trout streams in Virginia are classified by the Department of Game and Inland Fisheries by their water quality, with class i the highest and class iv the lowest. Mercy Branch and Mill Creek are rated class ii streams.

== Topography ==
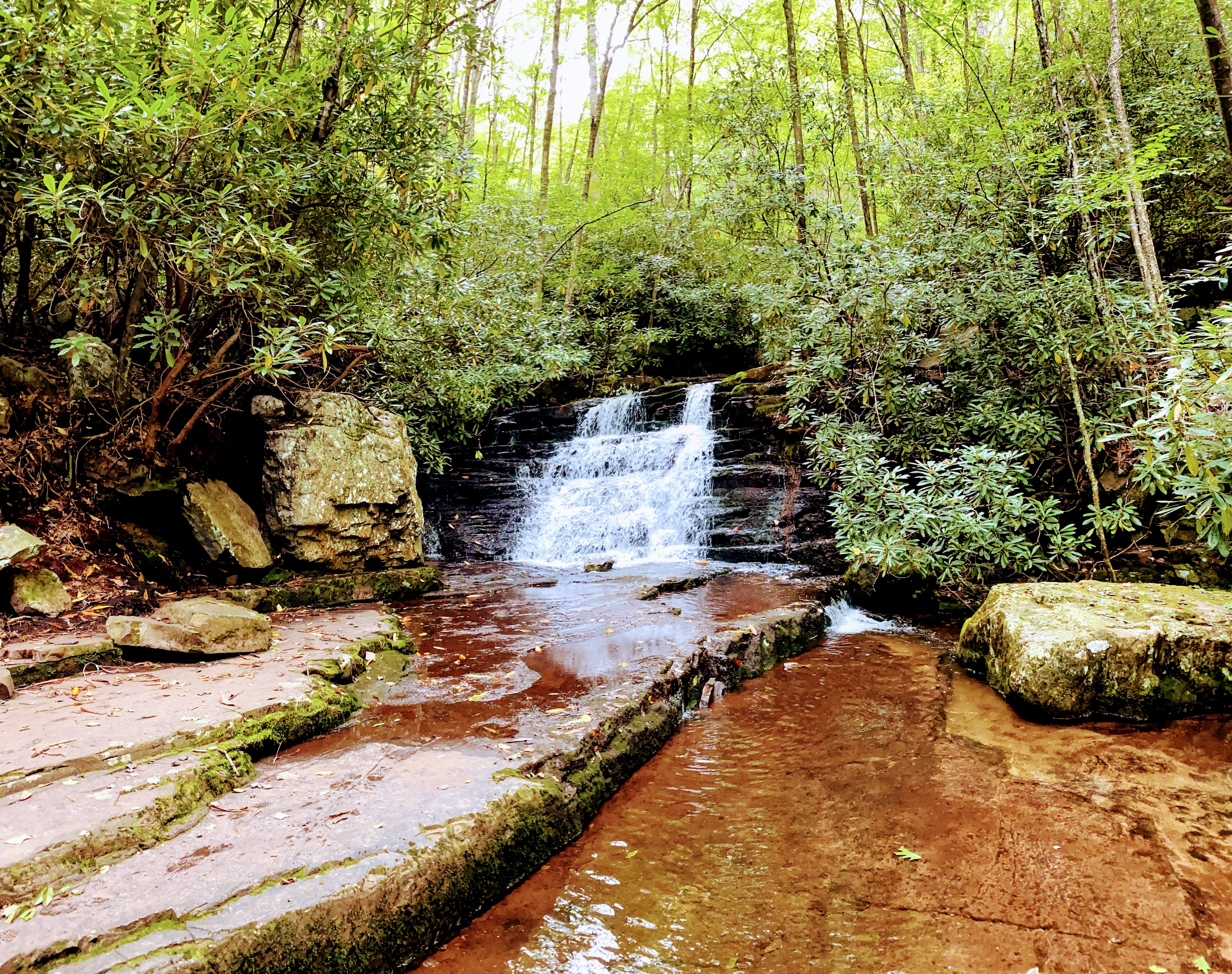
Mill Creek Falls

The area, which includes most of the Mill Creek watershed, is a high-elevation valley formed between the ridges of Wolf Creek and Pearis mountains. Mercy Branch, a tributary of Mill Creek, drains the northwest end of the area. The summits of Angels Rest, a 3633-foot peak on the northeast, and Sentinel Point, a 3444-foot peak on the northwest, offer views of Peters Mountain, Salt Pond Mountain, and the New River Valley; and there are good views of Wilburn Valley on the east from the Appalachian Trail as it follows along the ridge of Pearis Mountain.

Mill Creek has a series of waterfalls, Mill Creek Falls, that extends over one-half mile beginning with a 45-foot rock stairway, followed by an 18-foot drop and finally a 10-foot fall. The falls can be seen from a trail along the creek maintained by the town of Narrows. Mill Creek exits the valley through a narrow gap in Wolf Creek Mountain, then flows into Wolf Creek, a tributary of the New River. The falls are located on the Mill Creek Loop hiking trail and contains three waterfalls, Mill Creek Falls, Mill Creek Dam, and Mercy Creek Falls, the loop is 7.8 miles and has an 1800 ft gain. Mill Creek Loop hiking trail reaches a maximum elevation at Sentinel Point and has a view of Wolf Creek Valley and the New River.

Mill Creek received a silver award in "Best of the Blue Ridge" in 2013 and was also featured in a national commercial for Barbarsol shave cream.

Mill Creek Dam (Narrows Reservoir) is located approximately 0.5 miles downstream from Mill Creek Falls. The dam was constructed to create a spillway to use running water to turn a waterwheel and power a mill. The reservoir served as a water source for the town of Narrows until the 1970s. The original hand-cut stone portion of the dam is still functional and dates to the 1780s.

The Town of Narrows has a reservoir fed by Mill Creek near the exit of the creek from the valley.

== Forest Service management ==
The Forest Service has conducted a survey of their lands to determine the potential for wilderness designation. Wilderness designation provides a high degree of protection from development. The areas that were found suitable are referred to as inventoried roadless areas. Later a Roadless Rule was adopted that limited road construction in these areas. The rule provides some degree of protection by reducing the negative environmental impact of road construction and thus promoting the conservation of roadless areas. Mill Creek was not inventoried in the roadless area review, and therefore not protected from possible road construction and timber sales.

Consideration for wilderness designation was rejected because of the presence of two powerlines that crossed the area. One of the powerlines was removed in 2010 with the aid of an airlift of two supporting towers; the other powerline has been decommissioned.

There has been illegal use of all-terrain vehicles in the area, including rides along the Appalachian Trail near the powerlines. The use of an illegal motorized trail, discovered in 2005, was stopped after arrests and multiple convictions.

The forest service classifies areas under their management by a recreational opportunity setting that informs visitors of the diverse range of opportunities available in the forest. Most of the area has been designated as "Remote Backcountry – Non-Motorized", a small section along the Appalachian Trail is designated "Appalachian Trail Corridor", and there is a small piece at the western end designated "Mix of Successional Habitats.

== See also ==
- Angels Rest Cluster
- Mill Creek Nature Park & Bike Rides
- Mill Creek Nature Park
- Ralph Robertson
- Town of Narrows
- Narrows Commercial Historic District
- Dismal Creek
