= Clinch Ranger District Cluster =

Protected natural area in Virginia, United States

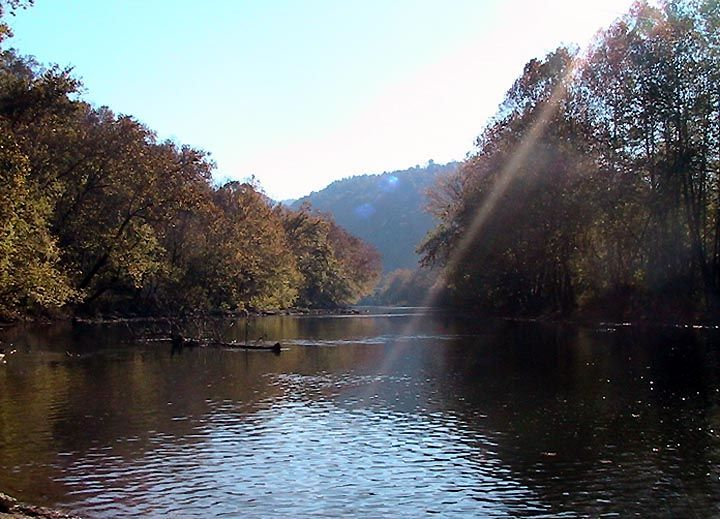
- The Clinch River

- Location within Virginia
- Location: Scott County; Dickenson County; Wise County; Lee County Virginia; Virginia, United States
- Coordinates: 37°7′29″N 82°35′51″W
- Administrator: U.S. Forest Service

The Clinch Ranger District Cluster is a region in the George Washington and Jefferson National Forests recognized by The Wilderness Society for its rich biodiversity and rugged scenery. It offers a unique habitat for rare plants, salamanders and other rare species.

== Description ==
The region includes wilderness areas protected by Congressional action, as well as inventoried wilderness and uninventoried areas recognized by the Wilderness Society as worthy of protection from timbering and roads. The cluster contains the following areas, all within the Clinch Ranger District of the George Washington and Jefferson National Forests:

- Northern section of the Clinch Ranger District
  - Stone Mountain Wilderness
  - North Fork of the Pound
- Southern section
  - Little Laurel Branch
  - Roaring Branch
  - Little Stony Creek
  - Devils Fork (conservation area)
  - Laurel Fork (conservation area)

== Location and access ==
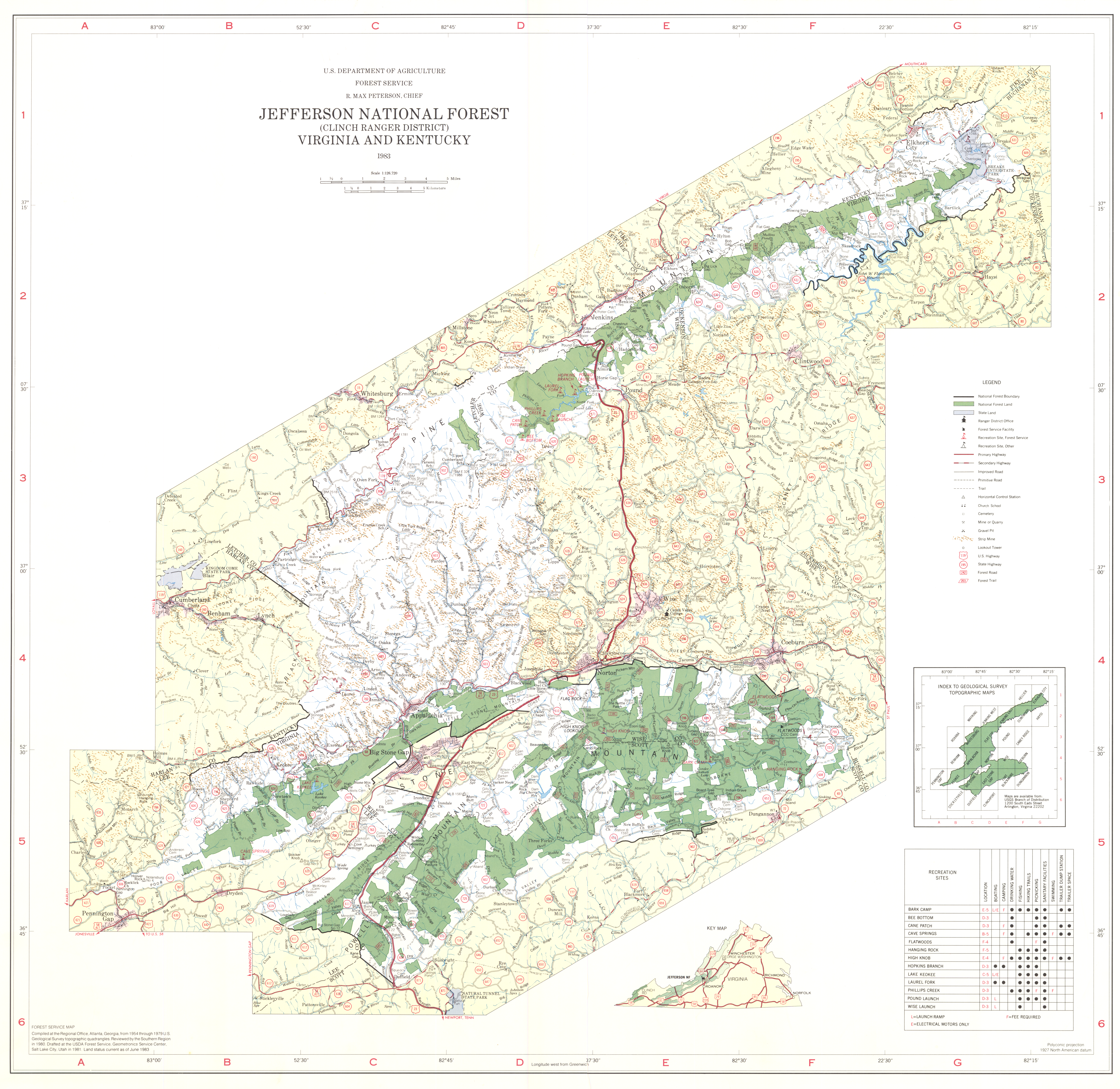
Map of the Clinch Ranger District

The Clinch Ranger District is divided into two parts, the northern section parallels Pine Mountain and the southern section follows Powell Mountain. US Highway 23 runs between the two sections. Other roads and trails in the area are shown on National Geographic Map 793, Clinch Ranger District.

== Geologic history ==
The Clinch Ranger District lies in the Alleghany Plateau, a highly dissected plateau composed of relatively flat-lying bedrock of Mississippian and Pennsylvania age. In places the dissection is so pronounced that the area has the appearance of mountains. But compared to the Ridge and Valley Province to the east with long uplifted ridges, the mountains are in random directions formed by the erosion of streams into deep, narrow valleys leaving rugged mountains. The Russell Fork River is an example of formations in the Plateau with almost 1000-foot-deep gorge and striking erosional features with descriptive names such as the Palisades, The Towers, and The Chimneys. .

The horizontal layering of the Plateau, seen in road cuts and rocky cliffs in river gorges, contrasts with the tilted up thrusts in the Ridge and Valley province on the east. Seams of high-quality coal led to mining beginning in the late 1800s.

== Natural history ==
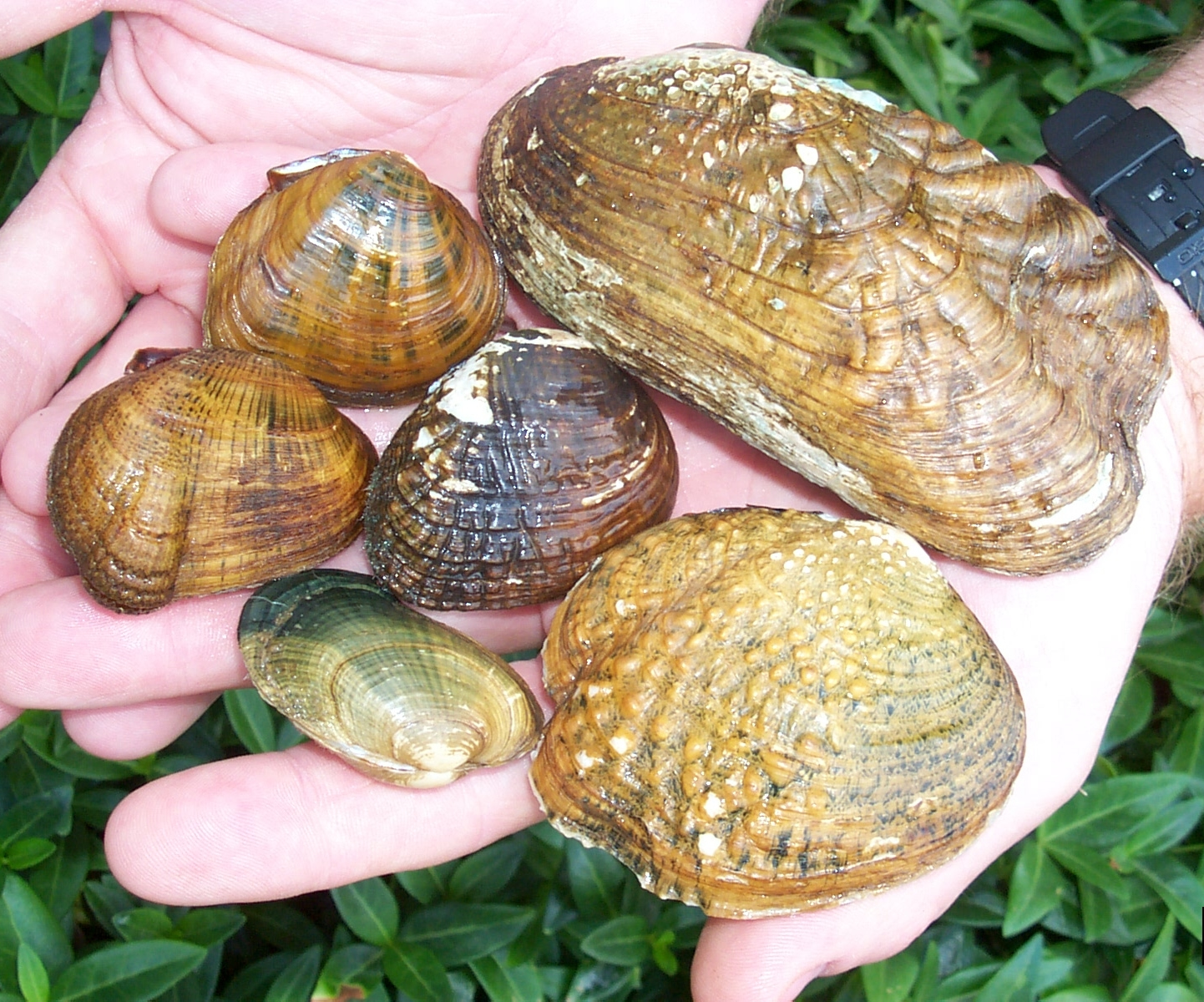
Endangered freshwater mussels. Bottom diagonal row, left to right: Cumberlandian combshell (Epioblasma brevidens), Oyster mussel (Epioblasma capsaeformis). Middle Row: Shiny pigtoe (Fusconaia cor), Birdwing pearlymussel (Lemiox rimosus), Cumberland monkeyface (Quadrula intermedia). Top row: Rough rabitsfoot (Quadrula cylindrica).

Clusters of wild areas, such as the Clinch Ranger District Cluster, are important for the maintenance of biological diversity. A natural landscape contains a blend of ecosystems—mountain slopes, moist areas, soil types, temperatures—over which species can roam in their search for mates, foraging for food, and the avoidance of predators and other stress-inducing hazards. The construction of roads breaks up the landscape into islands which limit the free migration of forest species. Such edge effects have been shown to minimize the diversity required for the maintenance of a rich biological habitat.

The bird population is also affected by the division of undisturbed forest into islands with edges defined by roads. Predators of birds, such as raccoons, snakes, skunks, house cats and egg-eating crows and blue jays, are often found at forest edges. And roads provide a pathway for Brown-headed cowbirds in their search for the location of nests of smaller birds, who then destroy the eggs and replace them with their own eggs leaving the unwitting owner to raise the cowbird hatchlings.

The Plateau Province is covered by a complex forest composed of northern hardwood interspersed with conifers. The southern Appalachians contain more plant species than anywhere else in North America since the region was a refuge for many species when glaciers covered the northern part of the hemisphere. In modern times, game species disappeared after widespread hunting, but with the beginning of game management many species have begun to recover to the extent that animals such as black bear, deer and turkeys can be found.

The watershed for the cluster contains many endangered fresh_water mussel species. The identified species has been reduced from 60 to about 40, with 26 listed by the Nature Conservancy as globally rare.

== Clinch Ranger District ==
The Clinch Ranger District Cluster lies within the Clinch Ranger District of the George Washington and Jefferson National Forest. To protect the headwaters of the Tennessee Valley drainage from flooding caused by timbering and the stripping of whole mountains by mining, the US Forest Service purchased the Clinch Range District in 1936.

== Other clusters ==
Other clusters of the Wilderness Society's "Mountain Treasures" in the Jefferson National Forest (north to south):

- Glenwood Cluster
- Craig Creek Cluster
- Barbours Creek-Shawvers Run Cluster
- Sinking Creek Valley Cluster
- Mountain Lake Wilderness Cluster
- Angels Rest Cluster
- Walker Mountain Cluster
- Kimberling Creek Cluster
- Garden Mountain Cluster
- Mount Rogers Cluster

== See also ==
- Maps of region:
  - USGS Bristol 1:100,000 scale topographic map
  - USGS Pikeville 1:100,000 scale topographic map
- Nature Conservancy, Clinch Valley
- Forest Service, Clinch Ranger District
