= Little Laurel Branch =

Protected natural area in Virginia, United States

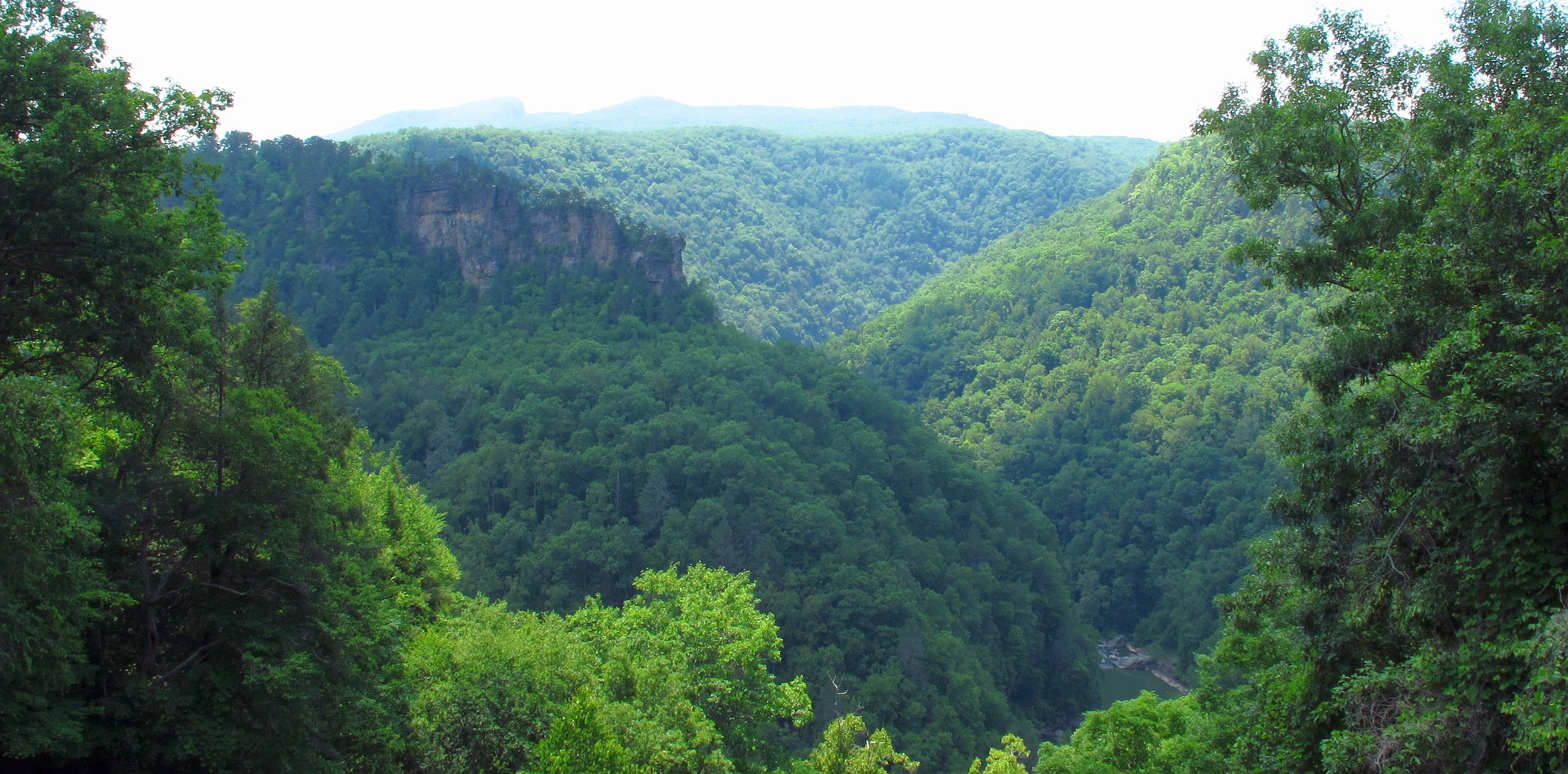
- Russell Fork, A Boundary for Little Laurel Branch wild area

- Location within Virginia
- Location: Dickenson County, Virginia, United States
- Coordinates: 37°16′19″N 82°18′30″W
- Area: 740 acres (300 ha)
- Administrator: U.S. Forest Service

Little Laurel Branch, a wildland in the George Washington and Jefferson National Forests of western Virginia, has been recognized by the Wilderness Society as a special place worthy of protection from logging and road construction. The Wilderness Society has designated the area as a "Mountain Treasure".

A strikingly scenic place, Little Laurel Branch is an unusual find in the Cumberland Mountains. It contains part of a water gap, the Breaks of Pine Mountain, with multi-level cliffs and vertical wooded slopes.

This wildland is part of the Clinch Ranger District Cluster.

== Location and access ==
The area is located in the Cumberland Mountains of Southwestern Virginia, about 18 miles southeast of Pikeville, Kentucky and 31 miles west of Richlands, Virginia. It is next to Breaks Interstate Park.

There are no trails into the area. However, the Pine Mountain Trail passes within one mile giving an overview into the area at Elkhorn City Overlook, Cave and Skagg Overlook.

Skagg Branch Rd. (Rt 2031) passes into the area.

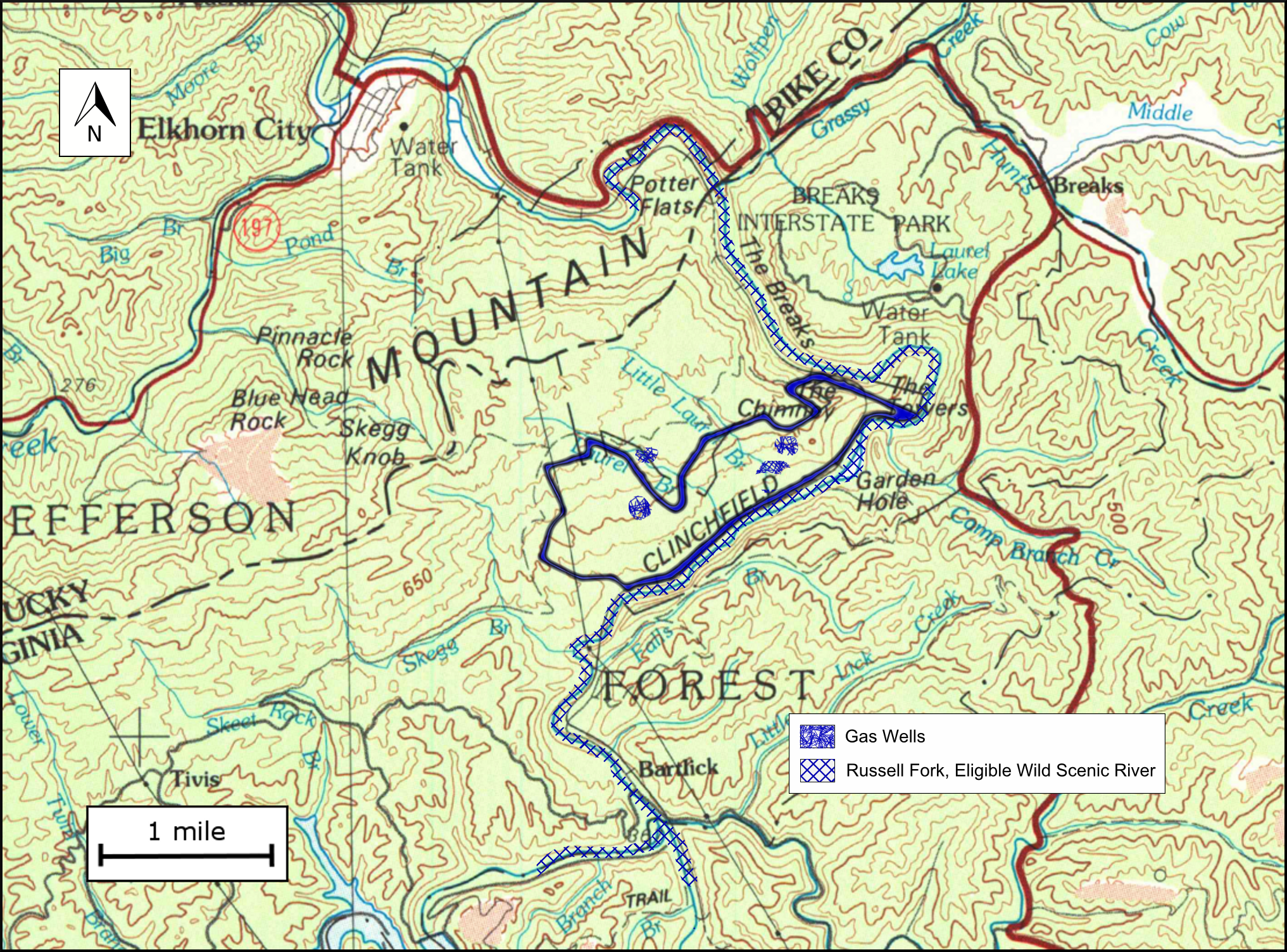
Boundary of the Little Laurel Branch wild area as identified by the Wilderness Society.

The boundary of the wildland as determined by the Wilderness Society is shown in the adjacent map. Additional roads and trails are given on National Geographic Maps 789 (Clinch Ranger District). A great variety of information, including topographic maps, aerial views, satellite data and weather information, is obtained by selecting the link with the wildland's gps coordinates in the upper right of this page.

Beyond maintained trails, old logging roads can be used to explore the area. The Cumberland Mountains were extensively timbered in the early twentieth century leaving logging roads that are becoming overgrown but still passable. Old logging roads and railroad grades can be located by consulting the historical topographic maps available from the United States Geological Survey (USGS). The Little Laurel Branch wild area is covered by USGS topographic map Elkhorn City.

== Natural history ==
The eastern side of the area is part of the Chimney Cliffs and Russell Fork special biological area, home to a state-listed plant and federally threatened plant.

A population of the rare Virginia spiraea plant is found in the river area.

Massive rocks and cliffs provide habitat for calcium rich and iron rich species.

== Breaks Interstate Park ==
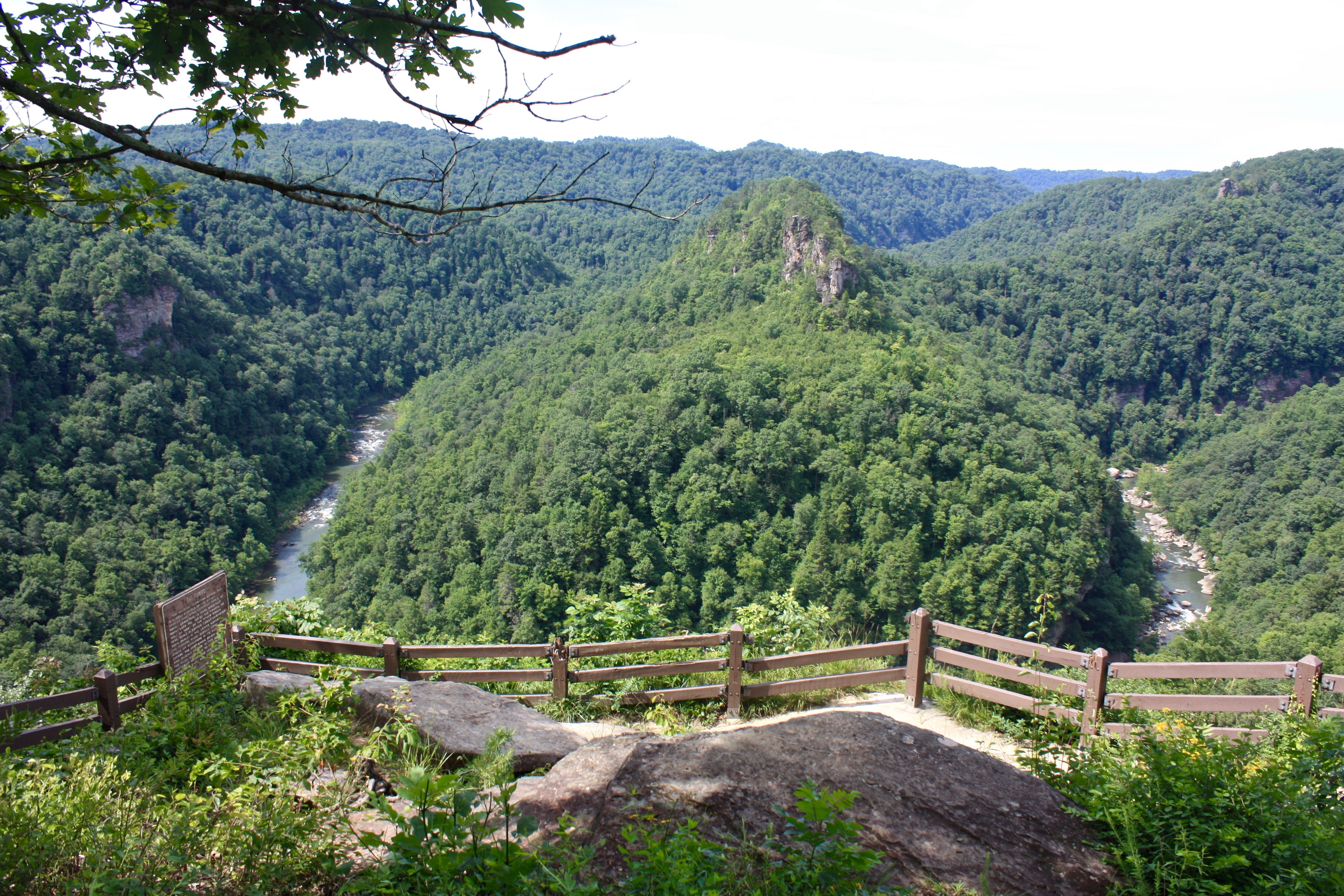
Breaks Interstate Park

The area is surrounded on three sides by the 4600-acre Breaks Interstate Park. Known as "The Grand Canyon of the South", the park contains a 5 mile long, 25 mile deep gorge, making it a popular visitor destination.

== Topography ==
The area is part of the Pine and Cumberland Mountains Subsection of the Southern Cumberland Mountain Section of the Central Appalachian Broadleaf Coniferous Forest-Meadow Province.

Pine Mountain, a prominent ridge in the region, is a "strike ridge", an escarpment more resistant to weathering than adjacent rock. As time passed, huge blocks of sandstone fell from the ridge leaving a rugged terrain.

The Towers, a large rock formation, is found at the eastern end of the area.

A section of Russell Fork is considered eligible for the National Wild and Scenic Rivers System.

== Forest Service management ==
The Forest Service has conducted a survey of their lands to determine the potential for wilderness designation. Wilderness designation provides a high degree of protection from development. The areas that were found suitable are referred to as inventoried roadless areas. Later a Roadless Rule was adopted that limited road construction in these areas. The rule provided some degree of protection by reducing the negative environmental impact of road construction and thus promoting the conservation of roadless areas. Little Laurel Branch was not inventoried in the roadless area review, and therefore not protected from possible road construction and timber sales.

The forest service classifies areas under their management by a recreational opportunity setting that informs visitors of the diverse range of opportunities available in the forest. The area includes land designated "Rare Community" and "Geological Area-Unsuitable".

Several gas wells were developed in the area around 1993. There are now possibly four gas leases in the area, some with access roads.

== See also ==
Clinch Ranger District Cluster
