= Dismal Creek =

Protected natural area in Virginia, United States

Dismal Creek (conservation area)
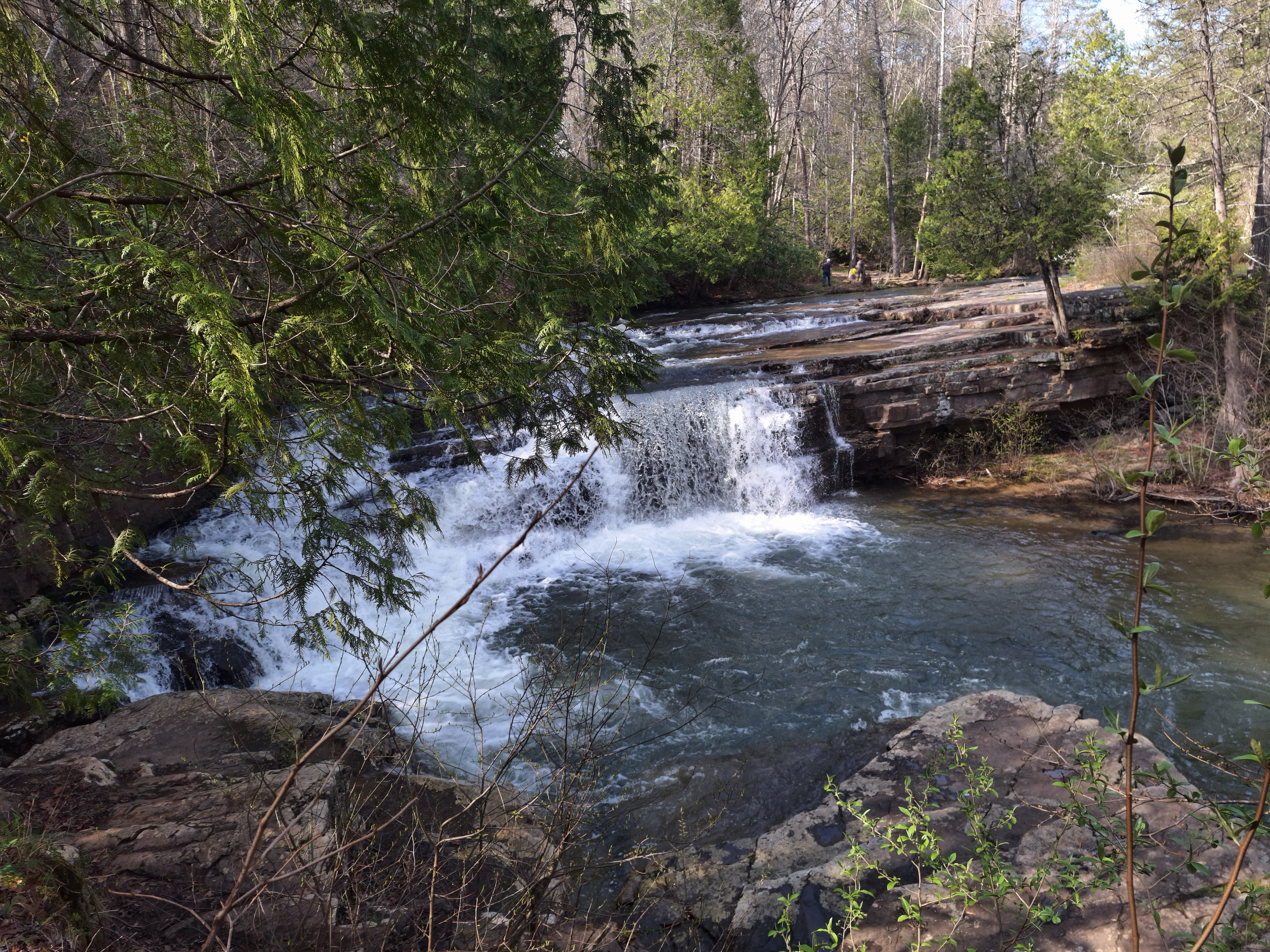
- Dismal Falls

- Location within Virginia
- Location: Giles County; Bland County; Virginia, United States
- Nearest town: White Gate, Virginia
- Coordinates: 37°12′33″N 80°52′1″W
- Area: 7,008 acres (28.36 km^{2})
- Administrator: U.S. Forest Service

Dismal Creek is a wildland in the George Washington and Jefferson National Forests of western Virginia. It has been recognized by the Wilderness Society as a special place worthy of protection from logging and road construction, and a "Mountain Treasure".

With several trails and a series of beautiful streams, this large area is popular with hikers, hunters, horseback riders, and fishermen.

The area is part of the Angels Rest Cluster.

== Location and access ==
The area is in the Appalachian Mountains of Southwestern Virginia, about 3 miles west of White Gate, Virginia. The wildland is mostly composed of the drainage of Dismal Creek, formed by a bowl between Flat Top Mountain on the northwest, Brushy Mountain on the southeast, and Sugar Run Mountain on the north.

The following trails give access to the area:

- The Appalachian Trail crosses into the area at Sugar Run Mountain on the northeast, then descends and follows Dismal Creek to the point where the trail crosses Va 606 on the southeast. The AT is crossed by Sugar Run Road, Va 663, near the entry into the area on the north.
- Ribble Trail is a blue-blazed trail that was once the route of the Appalachian Trail before a relocation of the trail. It leaves the present Appalachian Trail at mile-marker 13.4 (going south), then rejoins it at mile marker 21.0.

Flat Top Road, USFS 201, parallels the western boundary of the area. The Lions Den Rd., USFS 1015. 3.1 miles long, and the Yancy Rd., USFS 10281, 1 .5 miles long, give access into the area from October to early January. In 2011 the Lions Den Rd. was listed as "road suitable for high clearance vehicles" only. Honey Spring Cabin Rd., USFS 103a, 0.15 miles long, has been decommissioned.

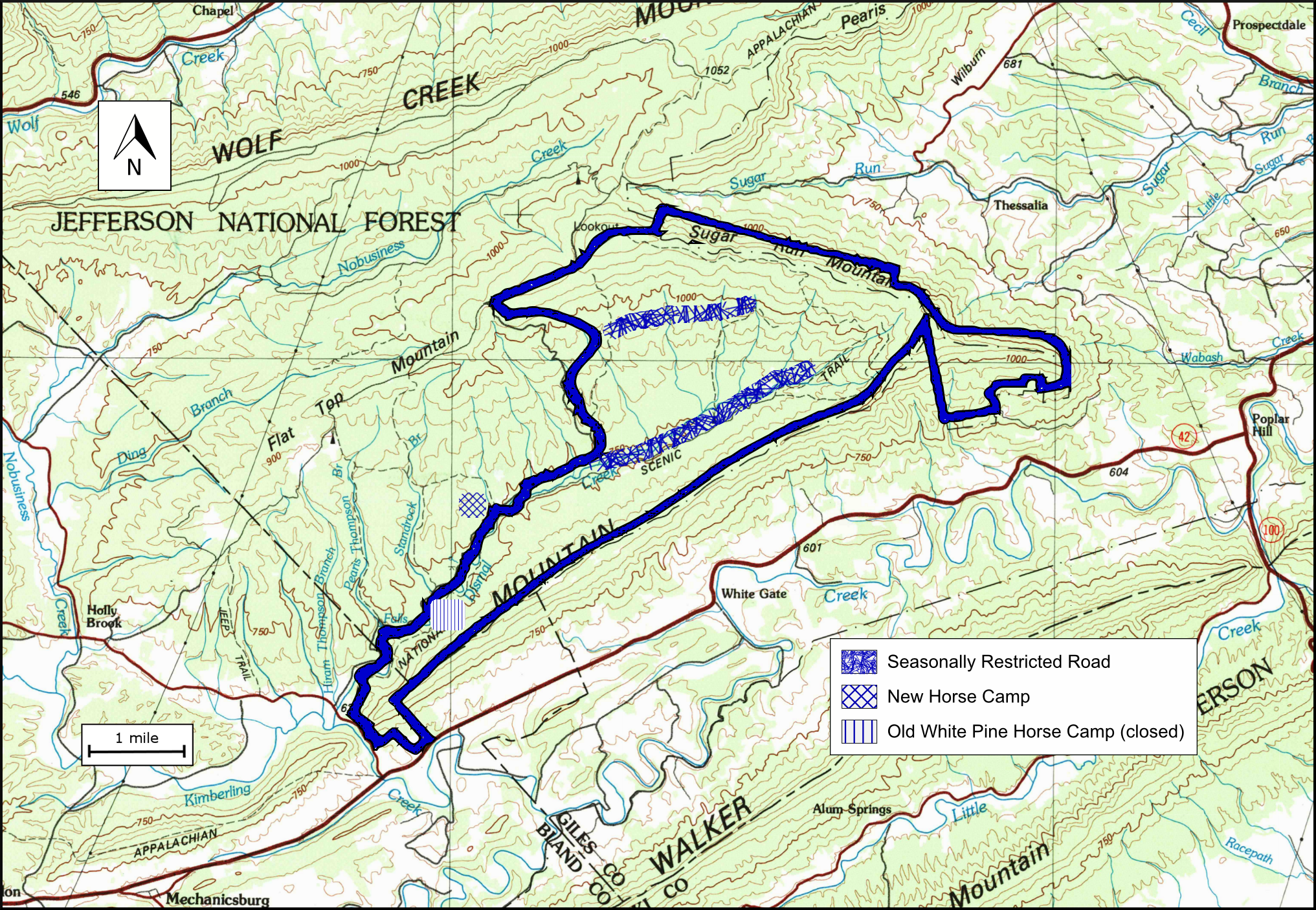
Boundary of the Dismal Creek wild area as identified by the Wilderness Society

The boundary of the wildland, as determined by the Wilderness Society, is shown in the adjacent map. The map can be enlarged by selecting the icon in the lower right. Roads in the area can be found on National Geographic Map 787 (Blacksburg, New River Valley). A great variety of information, including topographic maps, aerial views, satellite data and weather information, is obtained by selecting the link with the wild land's coordinates in the upper right of this page.

Beyond maintained trails, old logging roads can be used to explore the area. The Appalachian Mountains were extensively timbered in the early twentieth century leaving logging roads that are becoming overgrown but still passable. Old logging roads and railroad grades can be located by consulting the historical topographic maps available from the United States Geological Survey (USGS). The Dismal Creek wild area is covered by USGS topographic maps Narrows and Pearisburg.

== Natural history ==
The area is within the Ridge and Valley Subsection of the Northern Ridge and Valley Section in the Central Appalachian Broadleaf Coniferous Forest-Meadow Province. The large tract of connected land, unbroken by roads and removed from human habitation, offers good habitat for black bear, and supports many species of migratory birds.

The Dismal Creek special biological area includes part of this wildland, with piratebush and rare calcium-loving plants; and the Dismal Creek drainage area contains the uncommon northern white-cedar.

The area includes a fen, an unusual mineral rich wetland which tends to be alkaline as compared to a bog which is acidic.

Streams in the area have been recognized for their high water quality. Wild natural trout streams in Virginia are classified by the Department of Game and Inland Fisheries by their water quality, with class i the highest and class iv the lowest. Dismal Creek is rated a class iii streams.

Small tracts of old growth forest have been found on high elevations, but these tracts, designated "Small Tract-Custodial" by the Forest Service, could be traded for other lands and lost to the National Forest.

== Topography ==
The area, which includes the upper watershed of Dismal Creek, is a combination of high ridges and floodplain forests. Good views can be seen at High Point, with an elevation of 3300 feet overlooking Walker Creek Valley; and from the crest of Flat Top Mountain, 4087 feet, looking toward Sugar Run Mountain. There are old beaver ponds and a waterfall, the Falls of Dismal Creek, near the point where the creek leaves the area.

The name "Dismal Creek" probably refers to the valley's infertile soil that hinders farming. The underlying black shale contains pyrites. When pyrites decompose, iron oxides and sulfates are formed making the soil acidic and infertile. This compares to nearby fertile valleys formed on limestone that leads to a less acidic soil.

== Forest Service management ==
The Forest Service has conducted a survey of their lands to determine the potential for wilderness designation. Wilderness designation provides a high degree of protection from development. The areas that were found suitable are referred to as inventoried roadless areas. Later a Roadless Rule was adopted that limited road construction in these areas. The rule provides some degree of protection by reducing the negative environmental impact of road construction and thus promoting the conservation of roadless areas. Dismal Creek was not inventoried in the roadless area review, and therefore not protected from possible road construction and timber sales.

The White Pine Horse Camp, located close to Dismal Creek and within the Dismal Creek special biological area, has been moved to a location outside the Dismal Creek wild area, but still within a part of the Dismal Creek special biological area. The site was selected based on terrain and infrastructure considerations. The horse trail system has been enlarged and additional trails are under consideration.

The forest service classifies areas under their management by a recreational opportunity setting that informs visitors of the diverse range of opportunities available in the forest. The area includes tracts designated as "Appalachian Trail Corridor", "Old Growth with Disturbance", "Mix of Successional Habitats", "Rare Communitiy", "Dispersed Recreation Area – Unsuitable" and "Custodial=Small Areas".

While there are no plans for logging, the Forest Service has allowed firewood logging along roads in the area.

== See also ==
- Angels Rest Cluster
