= Roaring Branch =

Protected natural area in Virginia, United States

- Location within Virginia
- Location: Wise County, Virginia, United States
- Nearest city: Big Stone Gap, Virginia
- Coordinates: 36°52′3″N 82°48′34″W
- Area: 2,779 acres (11.25 km^{2})
- Administrator: U.S. Forest Service

Roaring Branch, a wildland in the George Washington and Jefferson National Forests of western Virginia, has been recognized by the Wilderness Society as a special place worthy of protection from logging and road construction. The Wilderness Society has designated the area as a "Mountain Treasure".

With old-growth hardwood pine forests, a stand of 300-year-old hemlocks, and a stream qualifying for Wild and Scenic river status, the area is one of the finest natural settings in Southwest Virginia. A trail leading into the area begins with a one-mile section of hand-laid steps built by the Youth Conservation Corp in the 1970s.

This wildland is part of the Clinch Ranger District Cluster.

== Location and access ==
The area is located in the Cumberland Mountains of Southwestern Virginia, about 4 miles southwest of Big Stone Gap, Virginia and 24 miles northwest of Mount Carmel, Tennessee. It is west of US 58.

The 14.3 mile Stone Mountain Trail passes from the Keokee Lake area to the Stone Mountain Wilderness while going through the area. From Roaring Branch, it climbs the southern side of Stone Mountain and then to the Stone Mountain Wilderness.

There are no roads into the area.

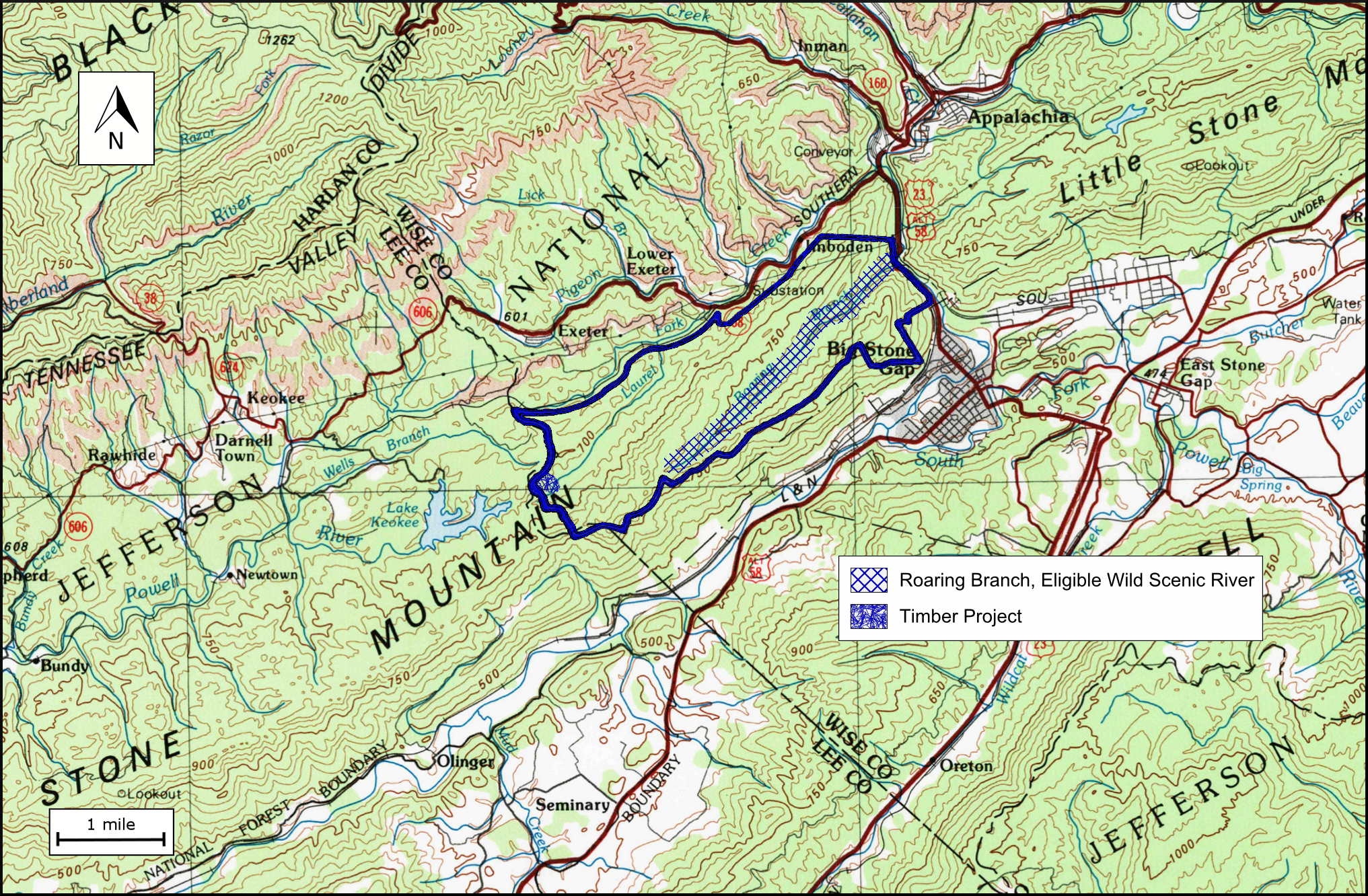
Boundary of the Roaring Branch wild area as identified by the Wilderness Society.

The boundary of the wildland as determined by the Wilderness Society is shown in the adjacent map. Additional roads and trails are given on National Geographic Maps 789 (Clinch Ranger District). A great variety of information, including topographic maps, aerial views, satellite data and weather information, is obtained by selecting the link with the wildland's gps coordinates in the upper right of this page.

Beyond maintained trails, old logging roads can be used to explore the area. The Cumberland Mountains were extensively timbered in the early twentieth century leaving logging roads that are becoming overgrown but still passable. Old logging roads and railroad grades can be located by consulting the historical topographic maps available from the United States Geological Survey (USGS). The Roaring Branch wild area is covered by USGS topographic map Appalachia and Big Stone Gap.

== Natural history ==
A length of old-growth forest along the Stone Mountain Trail provides habitat for the Swainson's Warbler and other songbirds.

The Roaring Branch special biological area, identified by Natural Heritage, occupies about 42% of the area, with a two-to-three century old hemlock-mixed mesophytic forest and old-growth chestnut oak. Part of the Keokee Lake-Laurel Fork Divide special biological area, located at the headwaters of Laurel Fork, has two rare species of plants.

Old growth forest is found along Roaring Branch, and the area near High Butte has forest over 140 years old.

== Topography ==
The area is part of the Pine and Cumberland Mountains Subsection of the Southern Cumberland Mountain Section of the Central Appalachian Broadleaf Coniferous Forest-Meadow Province.

The highest point in the area is High Butte at an elevation of 3050 feet.

A three-mile section of Roaring Branch is considered eligible for inclusion in the National Wild and Scenic Rivers System. For this designation, a waterway must be free of impoundments, generally inaccessible except by trail., and have an unpolluted watershed. The area's extensive old-growth forests, as well as its undisturbed nature, has been recognized by the Forest Service who regard it as one of the finest natural settings in Virginia.

== Forest Service management ==
The Forest Service has conducted a survey of their lands to determine the potential for wilderness designation. Wilderness designation provides a high degree of protection from development. The areas that were found suitable are referred to as inventoried roadless areas. Later a Roadless Rule was adopted that limited road construction in these areas. The rule provided some degree of protection by reducing the negative environmental impact of road construction and thus promoting the conservation of roadless areas. Roaring Branch was inventoried as part of RARE II, an inventory conducted in the late 1970s. However, the Forest Service stripped the area of this designation in the 2004 Forest Plan removing protection from possible road construction and timber sales.

The forest service classifies areas under their management by a recreational opportunity setting that informs visitors of the diverse range of opportunities available in the forest. The area includes land designated as "Eligible Wild River" along Roaring Branch, "Scenic Corridor" for a spur near Big Stone Gap, and "Mix of Successional Habitats" from the northeastern end to the southwestern corner.

The Forest Service approved the Wells Branch timber sale in 2012, with up to 27 acres in the headwaters of the Laurel Branch watershed.

== See also ==
Clinch Ranger District Cluster
