= Devils Fork (conservation area) =

Protected natural area in Virginia, United States

Devil’s Fork
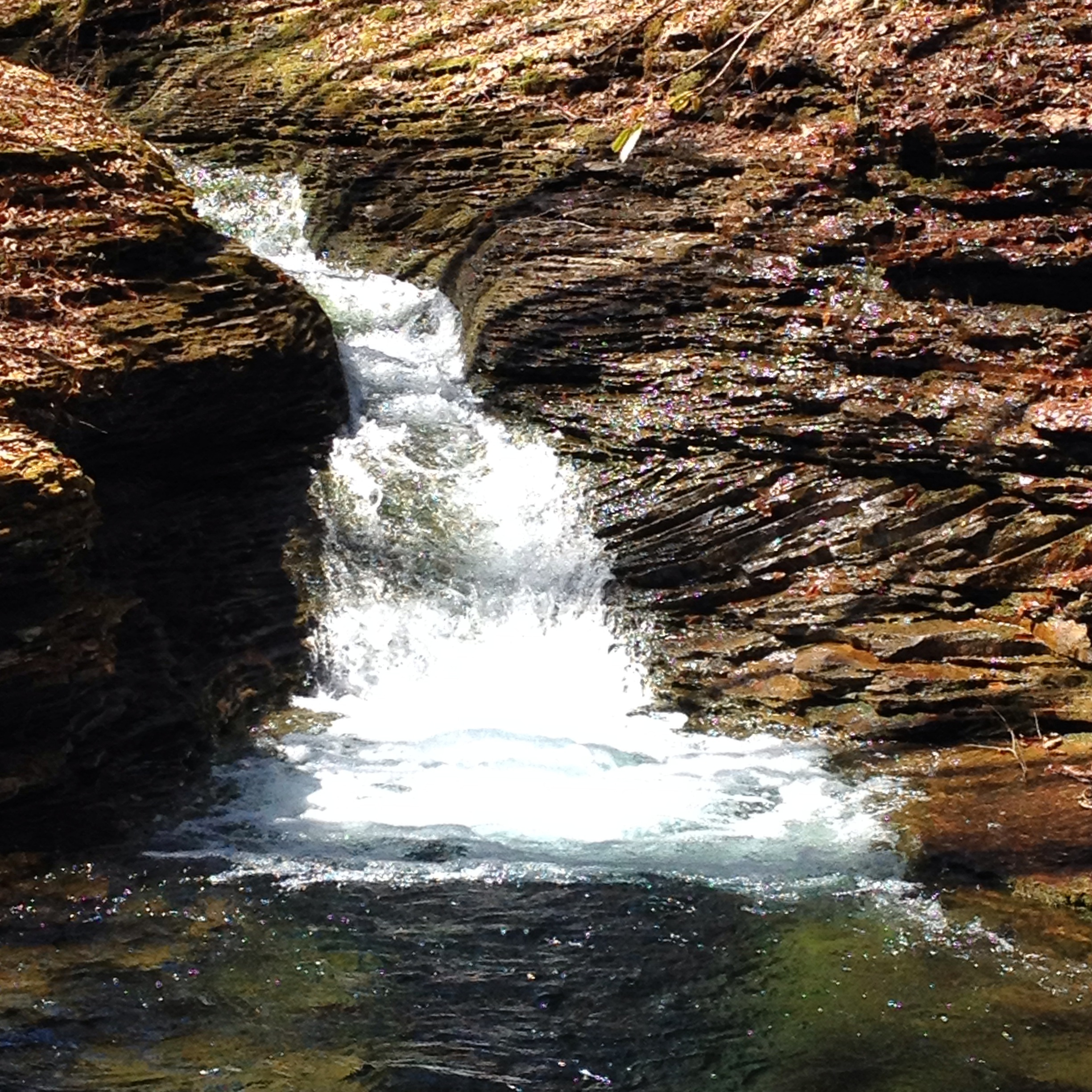
- Devils Bathtub

- Location within Virginia
- Location: Scott County, Virginia, United States
- Nearest city: Big Stone Gap, Virginia
- Coordinates: 36°49′37″N 82°39′17″W
- Area: 4,525 acres (18.31 km^{2})
- Administrator: U.S. Forest Service

Devils Fork (conservation area), a wildland in the George Washington and Jefferson National Forests of western Virginia, has been recognized by the Wilderness Society as a special place worthy of protection from logging and road construction. The Wilderness Society has designated the area as a "Mountain Treasure".

The highlight of the area is Devils Bathtub, a pool carved into rock, in a largely remote area. There are also scenic trails and a 20-foot waterfall.

This wildland is part of the Clinch Ranger District Cluster.

== Location and access ==
The area is located in the Cumberland Mountains of Southwestern Virginia, about 6 miles southeast of Big Stone Gap, Virginia and 20 miles north of Kingsport, Tennessee. It is between VA722 and VA 619.

Trails include:

- Devils Fork Loop Trail. Forest Service Trail 210, 6.92 miles
- Straight Fork Ridge Trail, Forest Service Trail 204, 1.83 miles

Straight Fork Road, about two miles long, provides access into the area.

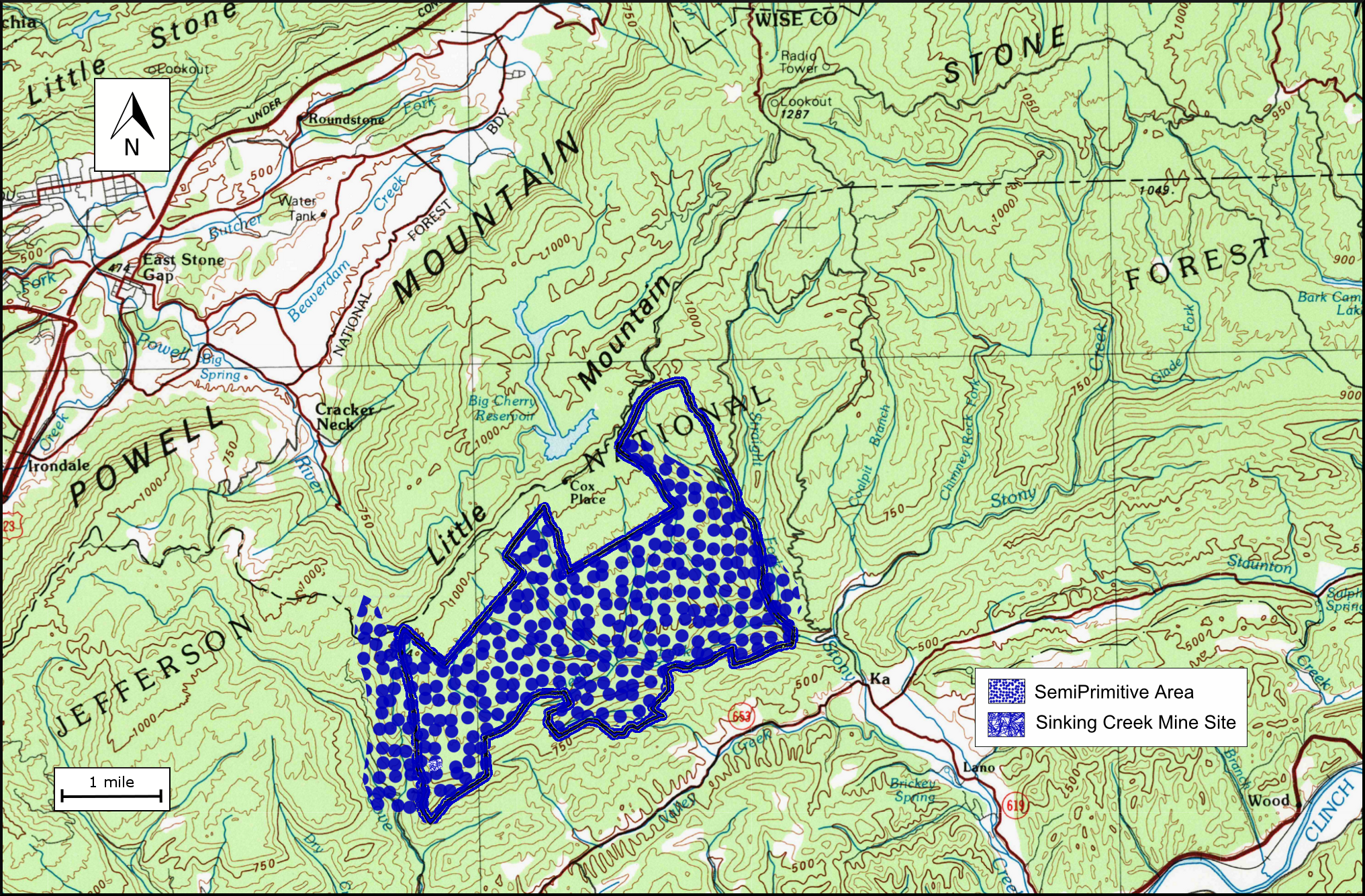
Boundary of the Devils Fork wild area as identified by the Wilderness Society.

The boundary of the wildland as determined by the Wilderness Society is shown in the adjacent map. Additional roads and trails are given on National Geographic Maps 789 (Clinch Ranger District). A great variety of information, including topographic maps, aerial views, satellite data and weather information, is obtained by selecting the link with the wildland's gps coordinates in the upper right of this page.

Beyond maintained trails, old logging roads can be used to explore the area. The Cumberland Mountains were extensively timbered in the early twentieth century leaving logging roads that are becoming overgrown but still passable. Old logging roads and railroad grades can be located by consulting the historical topographic maps available from the United States Geological Survey (USGS). The Devil's Fork wild area is covered by USGS topographic map East Stone Gap.

== Natural history ==
The area contains 628 acres of old growth forest, mostly white oak/red oak/hickory forest. It includes habitat for the rare magnolia warbler, as well as other neotropical migrants. Game species include black bear, which has been reintroduced into the area, deer, and turkey.

Vegetation includes mixed hardwoods in higher elevations and conifers as well as rhododendron, and laurel in moist areas such as coves along river drainages. Two special biological areas are found here: the Straight Fork area on the northeastern corner, and the Good Spur Ridge area, with 200-year-old trees, on the west.

== Topography ==
The area is part of the Pine and Cumberland Mountains Subsection of the Southern Cumberland Mountain Section of the Central Appalachian Broadleaf Coniferous Forest-Meadow Province. The low elevation of 1550 feet is found at the lower Straight Fork, and the height of about 3490 feet at Cox Place on Little Mountain. While Devil Fork is the main drainage, Clinch Rock Branch of Straight Creek, Roddy Branch of Valley Creek, and Stinking Creek also drain the area and are also tributaries to the Clinch River.

== Forest Service management ==
The Forest Service has conducted a survey of their lands to determine the potential for wilderness designation. Wilderness designation provides a high degree of protection from development. The areas that were found suitable are referred to as inventoried roadless areas. Later a Roadless Rule was adopted that limited road construction in these areas. The rule provided some degree of protection by reducing the negative environmental impact of road construction and thus promoting the conservation of roadless areas. Devils Fork was inventoried as part of RARE II, an inventory conducted in the late 1970s. However, the Forest Service stripped the area of this designation in the 2004 Forest Plan removing protection from possible road construction and timber sales.

A permit to conduct coal exploration, near the western boundary along Stinking Creek, was granted to the Sinking Creek Coal Company in 1994. While surface rights for about 80 percent of the area are in federal ownership, all of the mineral rights in the area are in private ownership. Most of the mining and prospecting in the vicinity has been primarily for coal, but iron, limestone and sandstone have been produced in nearby areas.

The forest service classifies areas under their management by a recreational opportunity setting that informs visitors of the diverse range of opportunities available in the forest. The area includes land designated as "Back Country—non-motorized" for most of the area, "Scenic Corridor" on the south, "botanical and zoological area", "semi-primitive, non-motorized" and "Mix of Successional Habitats" on the northeast.

A prescribed burn was conducted on the northeastern corner of the area around 2008.

== See also ==
Clinch Ranger District Cluster
