= Laurel Fork (conservation area) =

Protected natural area in Virginia, United States

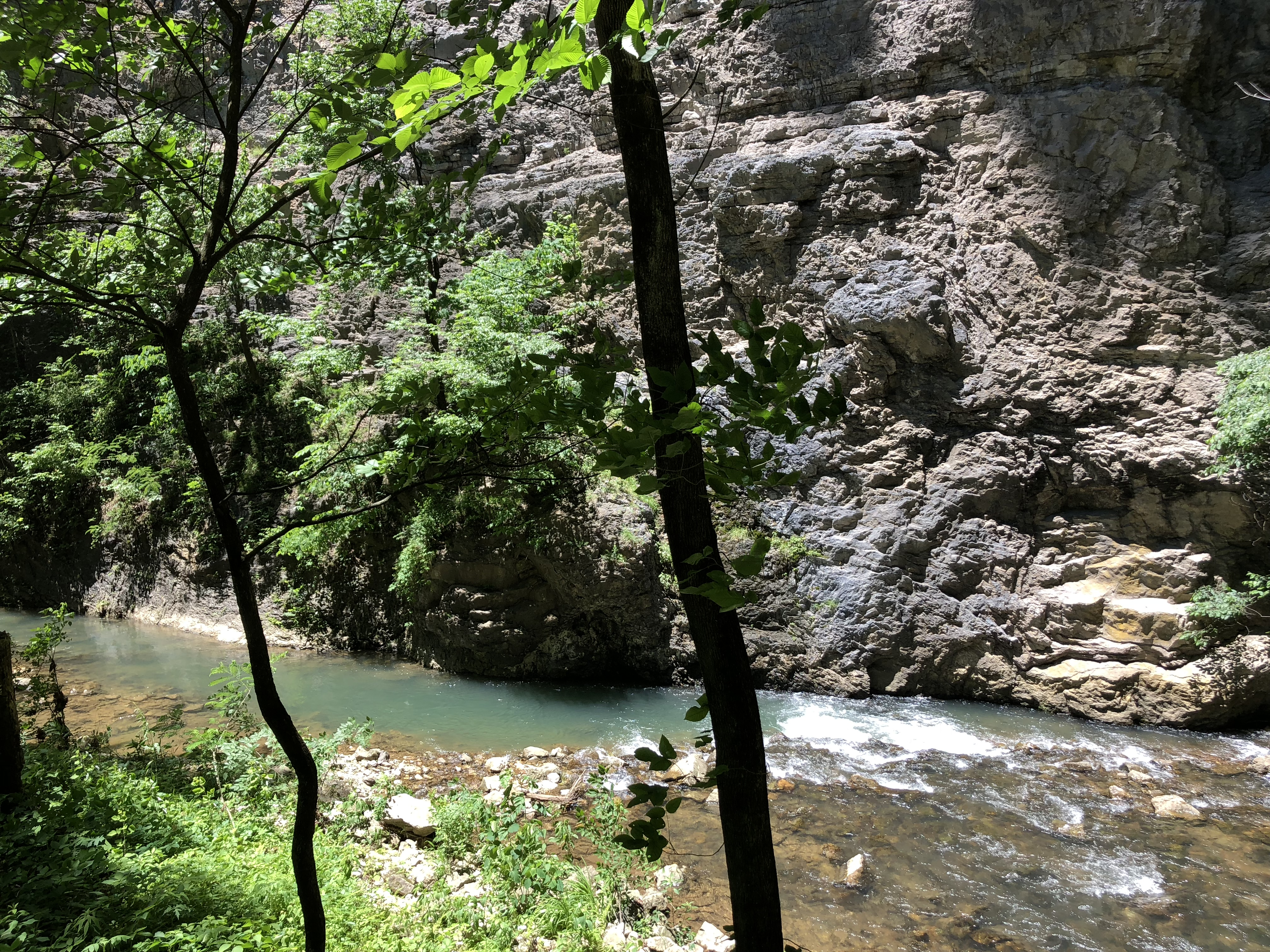
- Stock Creek, Downstream from Junction with Laurel Fork

- Location within Virginia
- Location: Scott County, Virginia, United States
- Nearest city: Big Stone Gap, Virginia
- Coordinates: 36°47′1″N 82°45′27″W
- Area: 4,525 acres (18.31 km^{2})
- Administrator: U.S. Forest Service

Laurel Fork (conservation area), a wildland in the George Washington and Jefferson National Forests of western Virginia, has been recognized by the Wilderness Society as a special place worthy of protection from logging and road construction. The Wilderness Society has designated the area as a “Mountain Treasure”.

A 200-year-old growth forest, in the center of the area, has trees 20 to 40 inches in diameter. The area contains several intact watersheds that maintain water quality downstream.

This wildland is part of the Clinch Ranger District Cluster.

== Location and access ==
The area is located in the Cumberland Mountains of Southwestern Virginia, about 6.8 miles south of Big Stone Gap, Virginia and 20 miles north of Kingsport, Tennessee. It is southeast of US 23.

There are no maintained trails in the area, however there are several roads, closed to motor vehicles, that are popular with horseback riders.

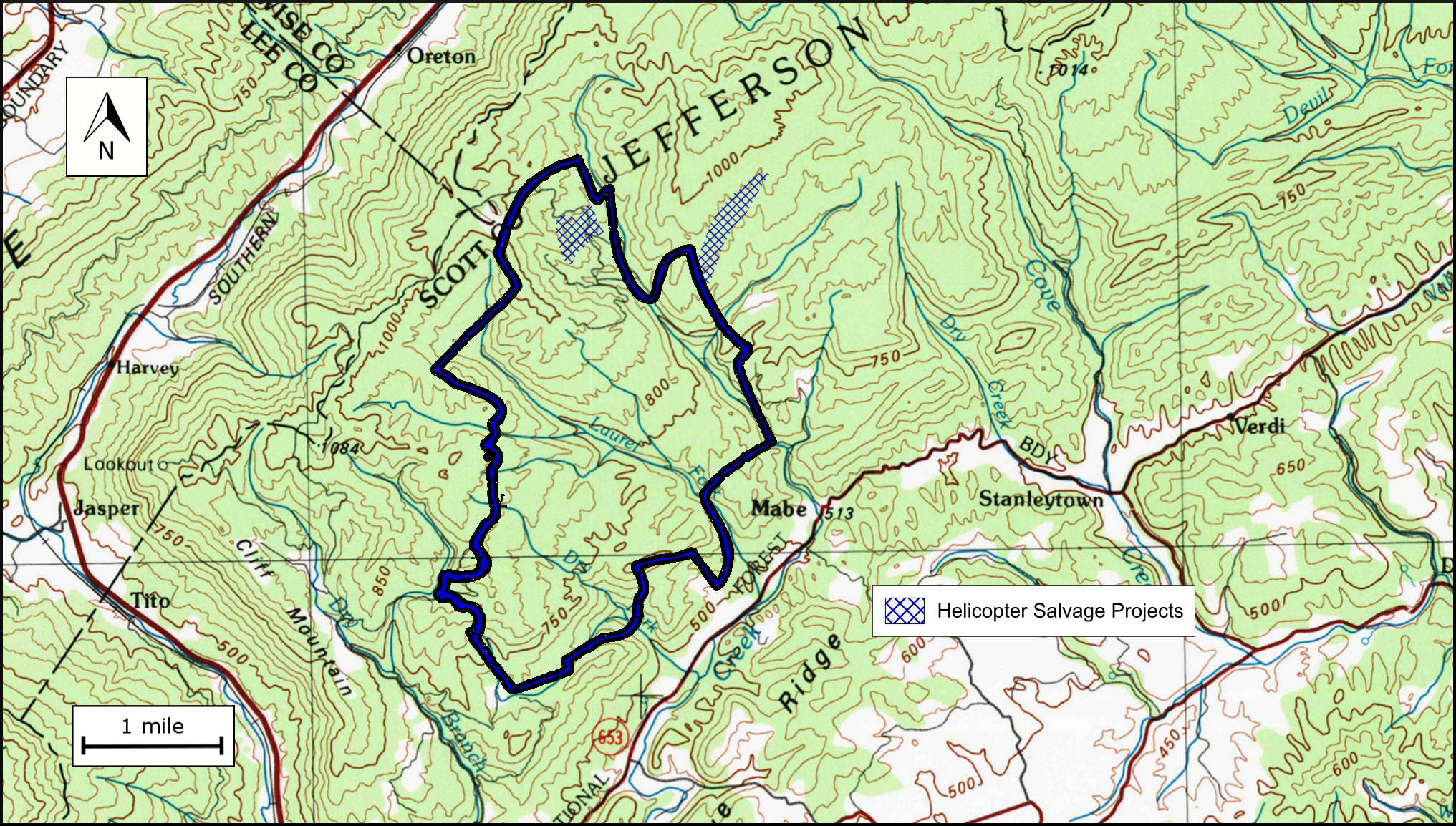
Boundary of the Laurel Fork wilderness area as identified by the Wilderness Society.

The boundary of the wildland as determined by the Wilderness Society is shown in the adjacent map. Additional roads and trails are given on National Geographic Maps 789 (Clinch Ranger District). A great variety of information, including topographic maps, aerial views, satellite data and weather information, is obtained by selecting the link with the wildland's gps coordinates in the upper right of this page.

Beyond maintained trails, old logging roads can be used to explore the area. The Cumberland Mountains were extensively timbered in the early twentieth century leaving logging roads that are becoming overgrown but still passable. Old logging roads and railroad grades can be located by consulting the historical topographic maps available from the United States Geological Survey (USGS). The Laurel Fork wilderness area is covered by USGS topographic maps East Stone Gap and Big Stone Gap.

== Natural history ==
The area contains the Pick Breeches and Flannery Ridges special biological area. The Cliff Mountain special biological area is on the northern border of the area.

The center of the area contains a 900 acres of old-growth forest, saved because of its inaccessibility due to rocky outcrops.

== Topography ==
The area is part of the Pine and Cumberland Mountains Subsection of the Southern Cumberland Mountain Section of the Central Appalachian Broadleaf Coniferous Forest-Meadow Province. It contains the watersheds for Laurel Fork, Dry Fork and Wolf Creek, tributaries of Stock Creek and the Clinch River.

== Forest Service management ==
The Forest Service has conducted a survey of their lands to determine the potential for wilderness designation. Wilderness designation provides a high degree of protection from development. The areas that were found suitable are referred to as inventoried roadless areas. Later a Roadless Rule was adopted that limited road construction in these areas. The rule provided some degree of protection by reducing the negative environmental impact of road construction and thus promoting the conservation of roadless areas. Laurel Fork was not inventoried as part of RARE II, an inventory conducted in the late 1970s and therefore is not protected from possible road construction and timber sales.

In 1993 there were two logging projects in the area, the Stock Creek helicopter salvage project and the Elisha Lick helicopter salvage project. The Stock Creek project was just outside of the Laurel Fork area, across the road from Stock Creek and the area's boundary on Rt. 710. The Elisha Lick project included a unit south of Rt. 2940 and to the west of the Wrights pasture inholding.

The forest service classifies areas under their management by a recreational opportunity setting that informs visitors of the diverse range of opportunities available in the forest. The area includes land designated as “Old Growth with Disturbance” along Flannery Ridge on the east, and “Mix of Successional Habitats” on the west.

== See also ==
Clinch Ranger District Cluster
