= Little Stony Creek =

Protected natural area in Virginia, United States

- Location within Virginia
- Location: Wise County, Scott County, Virginia, United States
- Nearest city: Big Stone Gap, Virginia
- Coordinates: 36°52′19″N 82°26′38″W
- Area: 1,120 acres (4.5 km^{2})
- Administrator: U.S. Forest Service

Little Stony Creek, a wildland in the George Washington and Jefferson National Forests of western Virginia, has been recognized by the Wilderness Society as a special place worthy of protection from logging and road construction. The Wilderness Society has designated the area as a "Mountain Treasure".

A scenic gorge, waterfalls and a cove hardwood forest, with rich vegetation, offer the visitor an opportunity for a secluded back-country experience.

This wildland is part of the Clinch Ranger District Cluster.

== Location and access ==
The area is located in the Cumberland Mountains of Southwestern Virginia, about 17 miles east of Big Stone Gap, Virginia and 23 miles north of Kingsport, Tennessee. VA 72 is on the southeast boundary.

The 3.1 mile Little Stony National Recreation Trail passes through the area, and is open to bicycles as well as hikers.

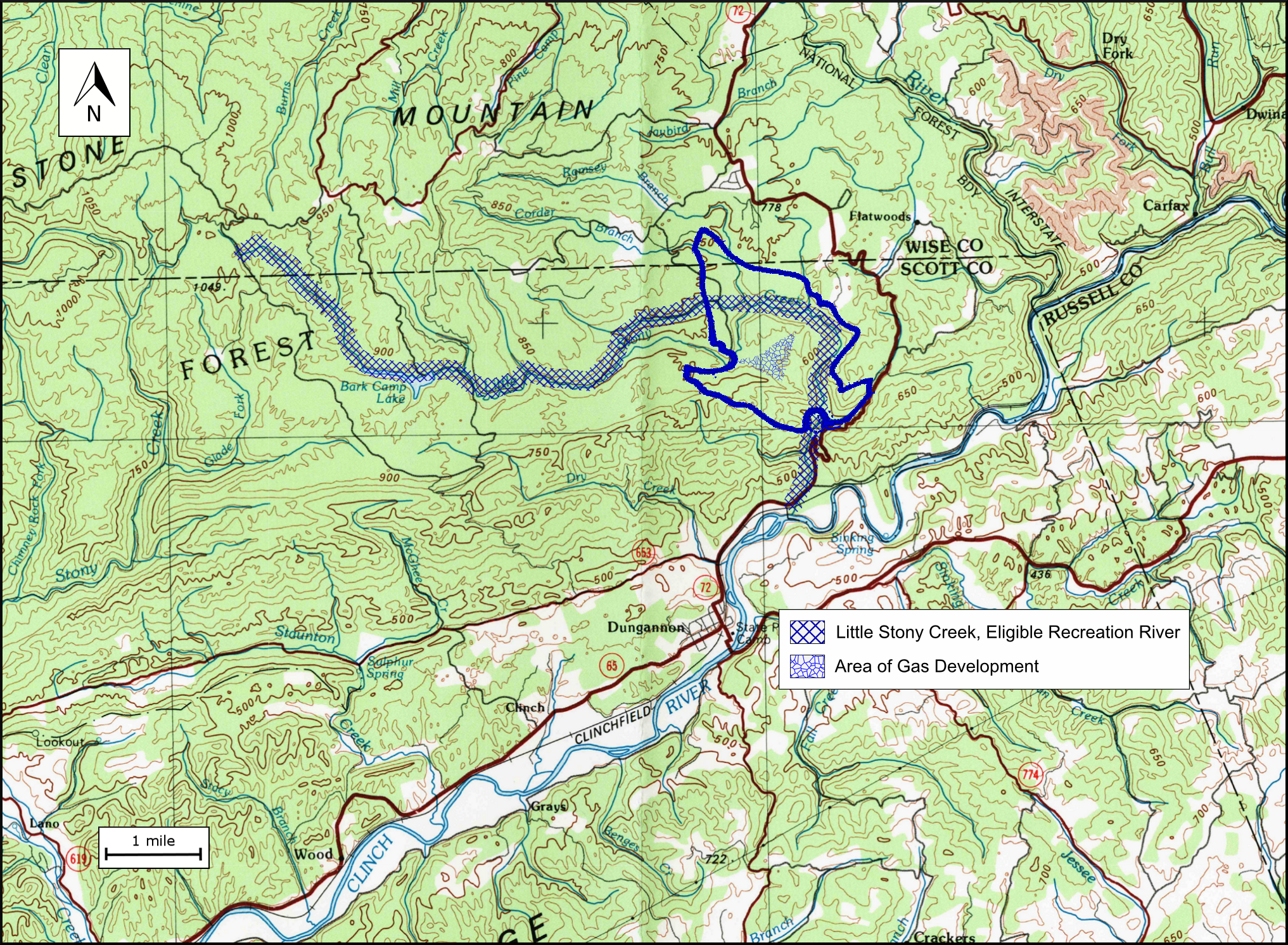
Boundary of the Little Stony Creek wild area as identified by the Wilderness Society.

The boundary of the wildland as determined by the Wilderness Society is shown in the adjacent map. Additional roads and trails are given on National Geographic Maps 789 (Clinch Ranger District). A great variety of information, including topographic maps, aerial views, satellite data and weather information, is obtained by selecting the link with the wildland's gps coordinates in the upper right of this page.

Beyond maintained trails, old logging roads can be used to explore the area. The Cumberland Mountains were extensively timbered in the early twentieth century leaving logging roads that are becoming overgrown but still passable. Old logging roads and railroad grades can be located by consulting the historical topographic maps available from the United States Geological Survey (USGS). The Little Stony Creek wild area is covered by USGS topographic map Dungannon and Coeburn.

== Natural history ==
Trout and the rare green salamander are found in Little Stony Creek. Pitch pine, table mountain pine, scarlet oak and spreading pogonia, a rare orchid, are found at higher elevations.

The Lower Little Stony Creek special biological area, which includes a large part of the area, contains many rare plants.

Little Stony Creek is a tributary of the Clinch River, part of the Upper Tennessee River system with 100 species of fish and 37 species of freshwater mussels, of which fourteen or more are endangered.

== Topography ==
The area is part of the Pine and Cumberland Mountains Subsection of the Southern Cumberland Mountain Section of the Central Appalachian Broadleaf Coniferous Forest-Meadow Province.

An 8.5 mile section of Little Stony Creek is eligible for inclusion in the Wild and Scenic Rivers System. And the section of Little Stony Creek passing through the area is one of 30 waters in Virginia classified by the state as a Virginia Exceptional Water.

== Forest Service management ==
The Forest Service has conducted a survey of their lands to determine the potential for wilderness designation. Wilderness designation provides a high degree of protection from development. The areas that were found suitable are referred to as inventoried roadless areas. Later a Roadless Rule was adopted that limited road construction in these areas. The rule provided some degree of protection by reducing the negative environmental impact of road construction and thus promoting the conservation of roadless areas. Little Stony Creek was inventoried as part of RARE II, an inventory conducted in the late 1970s. However, the Forest Service stripped the area of this designation in the 2004 Forest Plan removing protection from possible road construction and timber sales.

The forest service classifies areas under their management by a recreational opportunity setting that informs visitors of the diverse range of opportunities available in the forest. The area includes land designated as "Eligible Recreational River", "Rare Community", and "Mix of Successional Habitats" for a section south of Little Stony Creek.

A gas field, the South Coeburn Gas Field tens of thousands of acres in size, has been in place since the 1990s and includes gas development on the south of the Little Stony Creek wild area.

In 2008, most of the area was burned with prescribed burn techniques.

== See also ==
Clinch Ranger District Cluster
