= North Fork of the Pound =

Protected natural area in Virginia, US

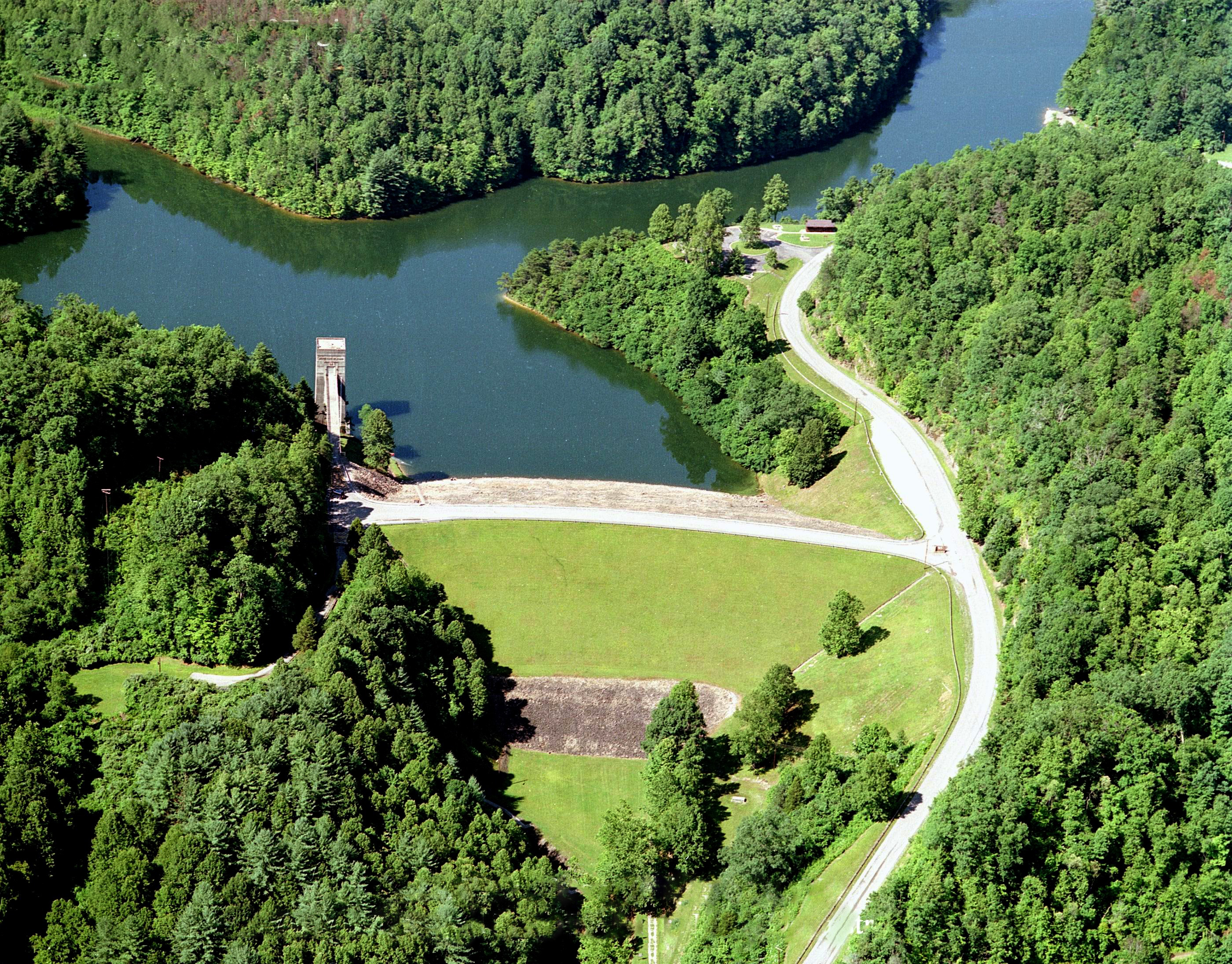
- North Fork of Pound River Lake

- Location within Virginia
- Location: Wise County, Virginia, United States
- Nearest city: Big Stone Gap VA
- Coordinates: 37°7′52″N 82°39′30″W
- Area: 4,756 acres (19.25 km^{2})
- Administrator: U.S. Forest Service

North Fork of the Pound, a wildland in the George Washington and Jefferson National Forests of western Virginia, has been recognized by the Wilderness Society as a special place worthy of protection from logging and road construction. The Wilderness Society has designated the area as a "Mountain Treasure".

The area can be accessed from three trails, and its remote location is a refuge for black bear and other species requiring an expanse of undisturbed habitat.

This wildland is part of the Clinch Ranger District Cluster.

== Location and access ==
The area is located in the Cumberland Mountains of Southwestern Virginia, about 18 miles north of Big Stone Gap, Virginia. It is west of US 23. Pine Mountain is on the northern boundary, and the North Fork of Pound Lake is on the southeastern border.

Trails in the area include:

- Pine Mountain Trail, formerly the Cumberland Mountain Trail, Forest Service Trail number 201, 24.6 miles long, backpacking. This trail is planned to eventually go from Breaks to Cumberland Gap.
- Laurel Fork Trail, Forest Service number 206, 1.5 miles long, bicycles
- Phillips Creek Loop Trail, Forest Service number 202, 1.29 miles long, bicycles

There are no roads into the area. Vehicular access can be gained by following VA 671 to Forest Development Road 834 to get within 0.4 miles of the area near Philips Creek Picnic area. Forest Development Road 2027, off VA 671, gives access from Cane Patch Campground. Boat access is available from several boat launch sites on the shore of North Fork of Pound Lake.

A primitive facility within the area, Laurel Fork Campground, can be reached by boat or by following the Laurel Creek Trail.

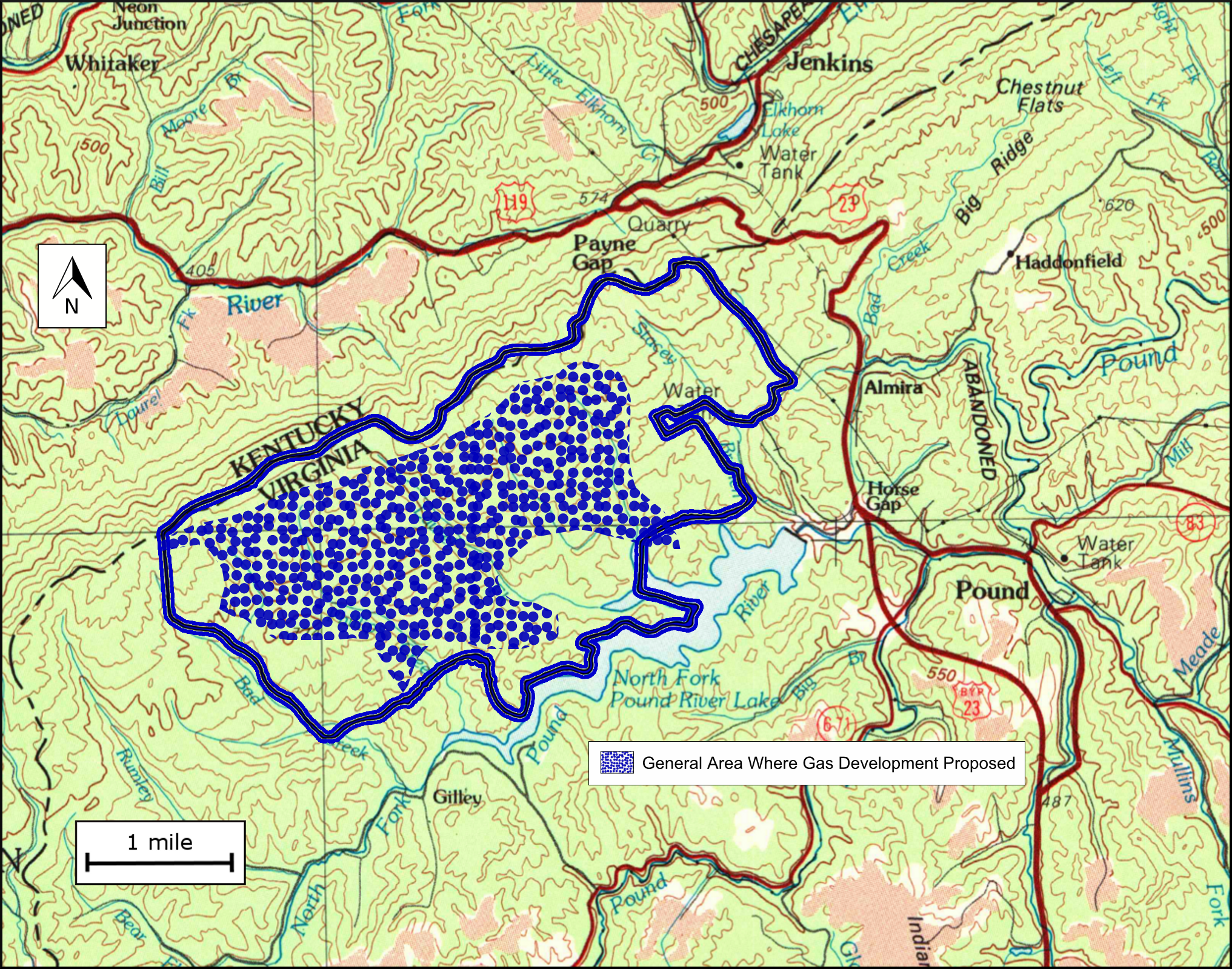
Boundary of the North Fork of the Pound wild area as identified by the Wilderness Society.

The boundary of the wildland as determined by the Wilderness Society is shown in the adjacent map. Additional roads and trails are given on National Geographic Maps 793 (Clinch Ranger District). A great variety of information, including topographic maps, aerial views, satellite data and weather information, is obtained by selecting the link with the wildland's gps coordinates in the upper right of this page.

Beyond maintained trails, old logging roads can be used to explore the area. The Cumberland Mountains were extensively timbered in the early twentieth century leaving logging roads that are becoming overgrown but still passable. Old logging roads and railroad grades can be located by consulting the historical topographic maps available from the United States Geological Survey (USGS).

== Natural history ==
Yellow poplar, northern red oak, white oak, basswood, cucumber tree, white ash, and eastern hemlock are found in colluvial drainages, while red maple, white oak, northern red oak, and hickory are found in the upper and midslopes. Understory plants include mountain laurel, rhododendron, huckleberry, blueberry, and greenbriars.

The area contains all or parts of three special biological areas:

- The Indian Grave Gap special biological area, containing wetland and old growth tracts in its 373 acres is completely with the area.
- All of The Cane Patch Ravines special biological area, a 890-acre sit just south of Indian Grave Gap special biological area
- Part of the Pine Mountain Tunnel special biological area where the rare eastern small-footed bat is known.

The area has as much as 153 acres of old growth forest.

Swainson's warbler, a locally rare bird, inhabits the area.

Elk have begun to be established making the area a popular elk hunting spot.

== Topography ==
The area is part of the Pine and Cumberland Mountains Subsection of the Southern Cumberland Mountain Section of the Central Appalachian Broadleaf Coniferous Forest-Meadow Province.

Containing most of Virginia's coal resources, the section is marked by faulted and folded monoclinal mountains with sandstone and shale interspersed with limestone. The area is highly dissected as the result of different erosion rates of the underlying rock beds.

Phillips Creek, Laurel Fork, Hopkins Branch and Stacy Branch, with headwaters in the area, flow into the North Fork of the Pound River.

The lowest elevation is 1581 feet on the north shore of the North Fork of Pound Lake, and the highest elevation is 3120 feet on a crest of Pine Mountain.

== Forest Service management ==
The Forest Service has conducted a survey of their lands to determine the potential for wilderness designation. Wilderness designation provides a high degree of protection from development. The areas that were found suitable are referred to as inventoried roadless areas. Later a Roadless Rule was adopted that limited road construction in these areas. The rule provided some degree of protection by reducing the negative environmental impact of road construction and thus promoting the conservation of roadless areas. North Fork of the Pound was inventoried in the roadless area review, and therefore protected from possible road construction and timber sales.

The forest service classifies areas under their management by a recreational opportunity setting that informs visitors of the diverse range of opportunities available in the forest. The area includes land designated "semi-primitive non-motorized". The entire area is designated as "North Fork Pound Special Area".

The area is subject to gas development with one developer proposing over 20 wells. Opposition to the development of gas walls has been unanimous approved by the Wise County Board of Supervisors.

Illegal motorized use has been reduced since a local environmental group, the Pine Mountain Trail Coalition, began monitoring the situation.

== Cultural History ==
There are historic and prehistoric sites in the area. The Short Family Cemetery is a late 19th/early 20 century burial ground. Other cemeteries and gravesites have not been recorded. There are several rock shelters, some have been looted and vandalized. A comprehensive inventory of these sites is needed.

== See also ==
Clinch Ranger District Cluster
