= Angels Rest Cluster =

Protected natural area in Virginia, United States

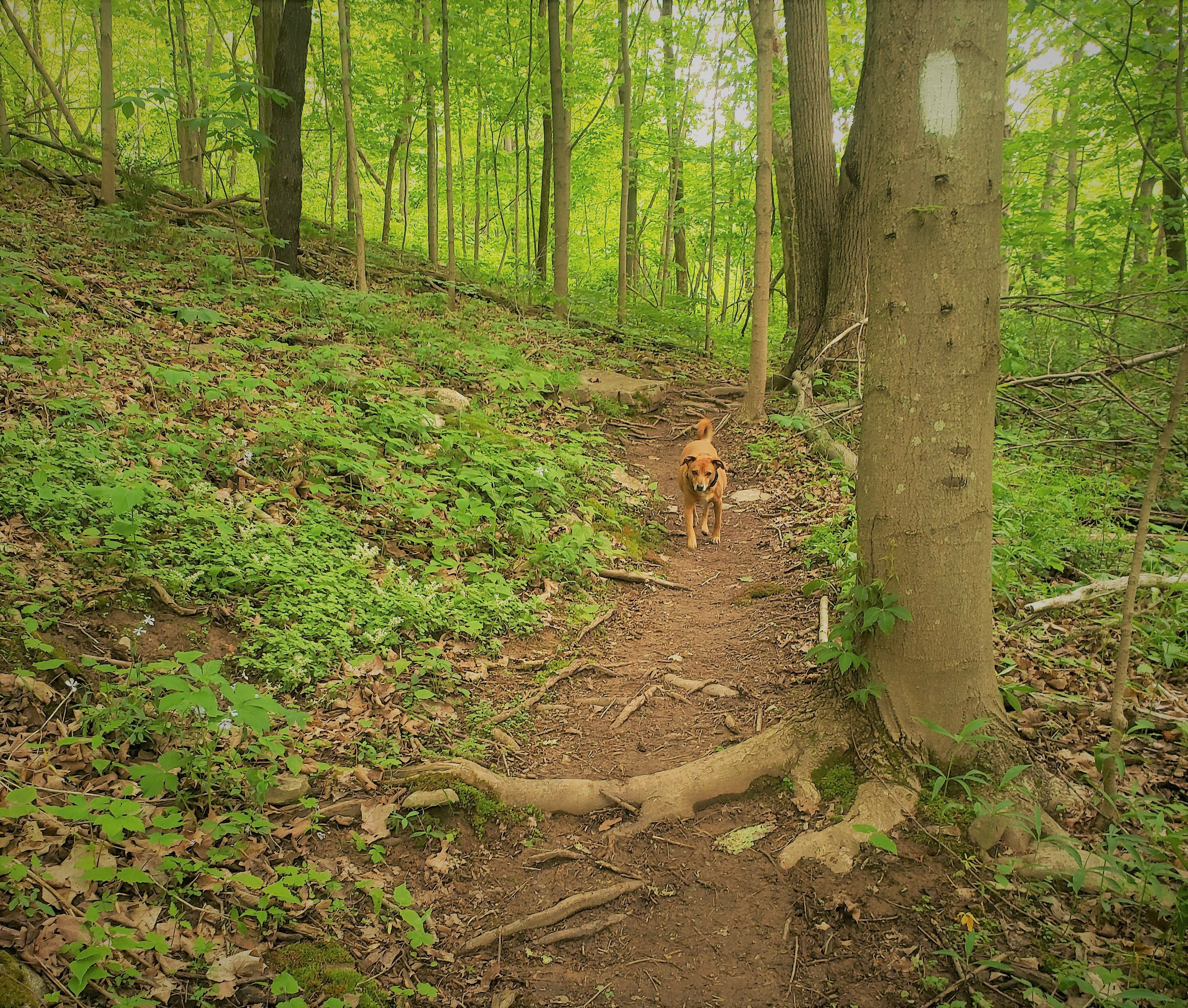
- Appalachian Trail leading to Angels Rest Cluster

- Location within Virginia
- Location: Giles County; Bland County; Virginia, United States
- Coordinates: 37°15′37″N 80°51′13″W
- Administrator: U.S. Forest Service

The Angels Rest Cluster is a region in the Jefferson National Forest recognized by The Wilderness Society for its diversity of habitats with steep mountains, an isolated valley, a waterfall and wetlands. It is named after a high point on Pearis Mountain with views of the New River and surrounding area. It contains two large wild areas connected by the Appalachian Trail.

== Description ==
The Angels Rest Cluster contains two wildlands recognized by the Wilderness Society as “Mountain Treasures”, areas that are worthy of protection from logging and road construction.

The areas in the cluster are:

- Mill Creek (conservation area)
- Dismal Creek

== Location and access ==
The northeast end of the cluster is about one mile south of Pearisburg, Virginia. Roads and trails in the cluster are shown on National Geographic Map 787 (Blacksburg, New River Valley). A great variety of information, including topographic maps, aerial views, satellite data and weather information, is obtained by selecting the link with the wild land’s coordinates in the upper right of this page.

== Appalachian Trail ==
The Appalachian Trail passes along the length of the cluster, from Pearisburg on the north it begins the climb to Angels Rest, then follows along the ridge of Pearis Mountain, crosses Sugar Run Gap, turns to proceed along Sugar Run Mountain to a descent along Dismal Creek, passing Dismal Creek Falls, to reach Va 606, the southern end of the cluster. There are two shelters, Docs Knob Shelter, two miles north of Sugar Run Gap, and Wapiti Shelter, seven miles south of Sugar Run Gap. A campground, Walnut Flats Campground, is four miles south of Wapiti Shelter near the point where the trail approaches Forest Service road USFS 2010.

The Wapiti Shelter was assembled in 1981 when it was relocated from another site. “Wapiti” is the Indian name for elk, a mammal that was once abundant in the Appalachians but hunted to extinction, with the last one believed to have been shot in 1867. Both bison and elk inhabited the Appalachians. The last bison cow and calf were killed in 1825 near Valley Head, West Virginia.

== Biological significance ==
The land form, climate, soils and geology of the Appalachian highlands, as well as its evolutionary history, have created one of the most diverse collection of plants and animals in the deciduous forests of the temperate world.

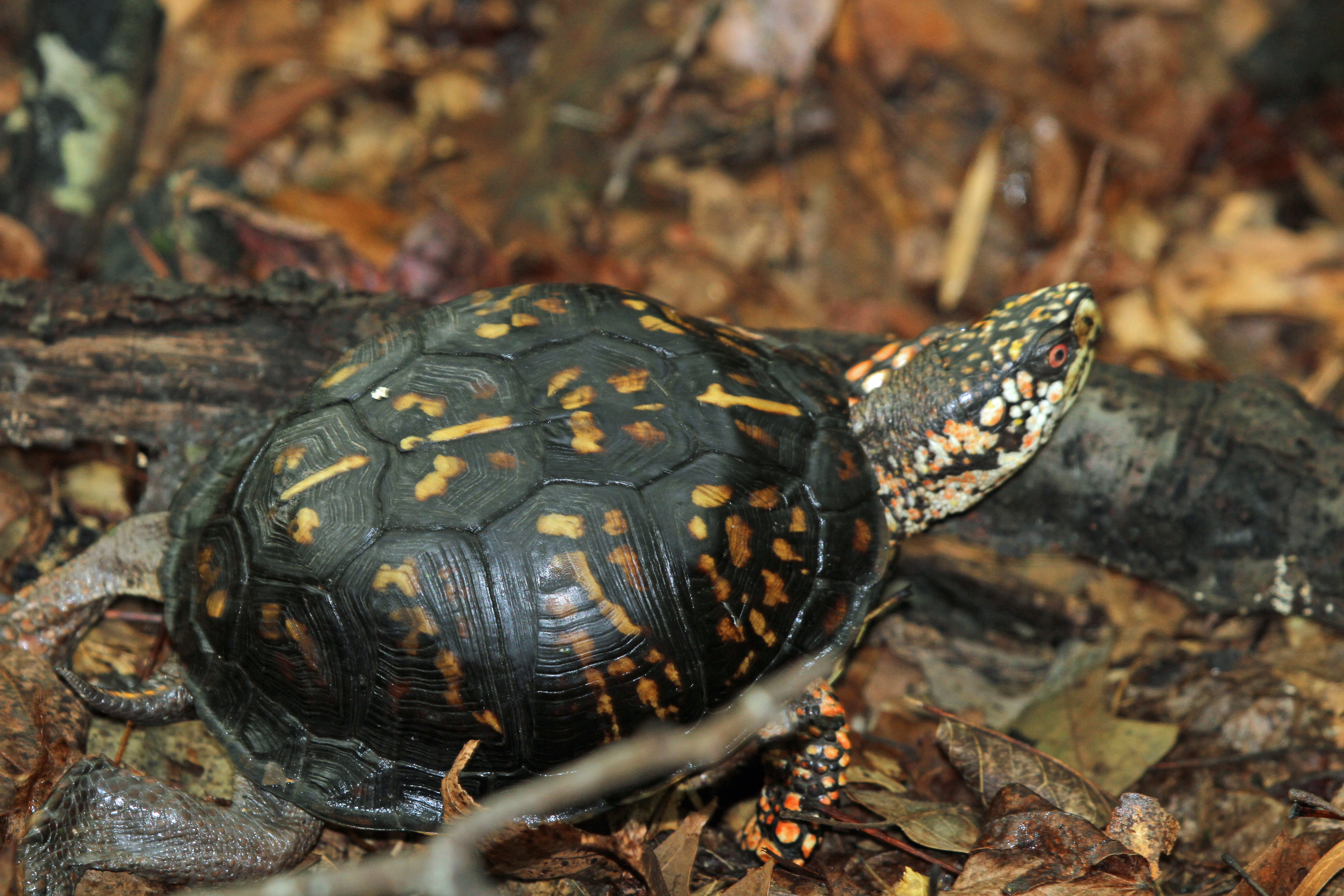
Eastern Box Turtle

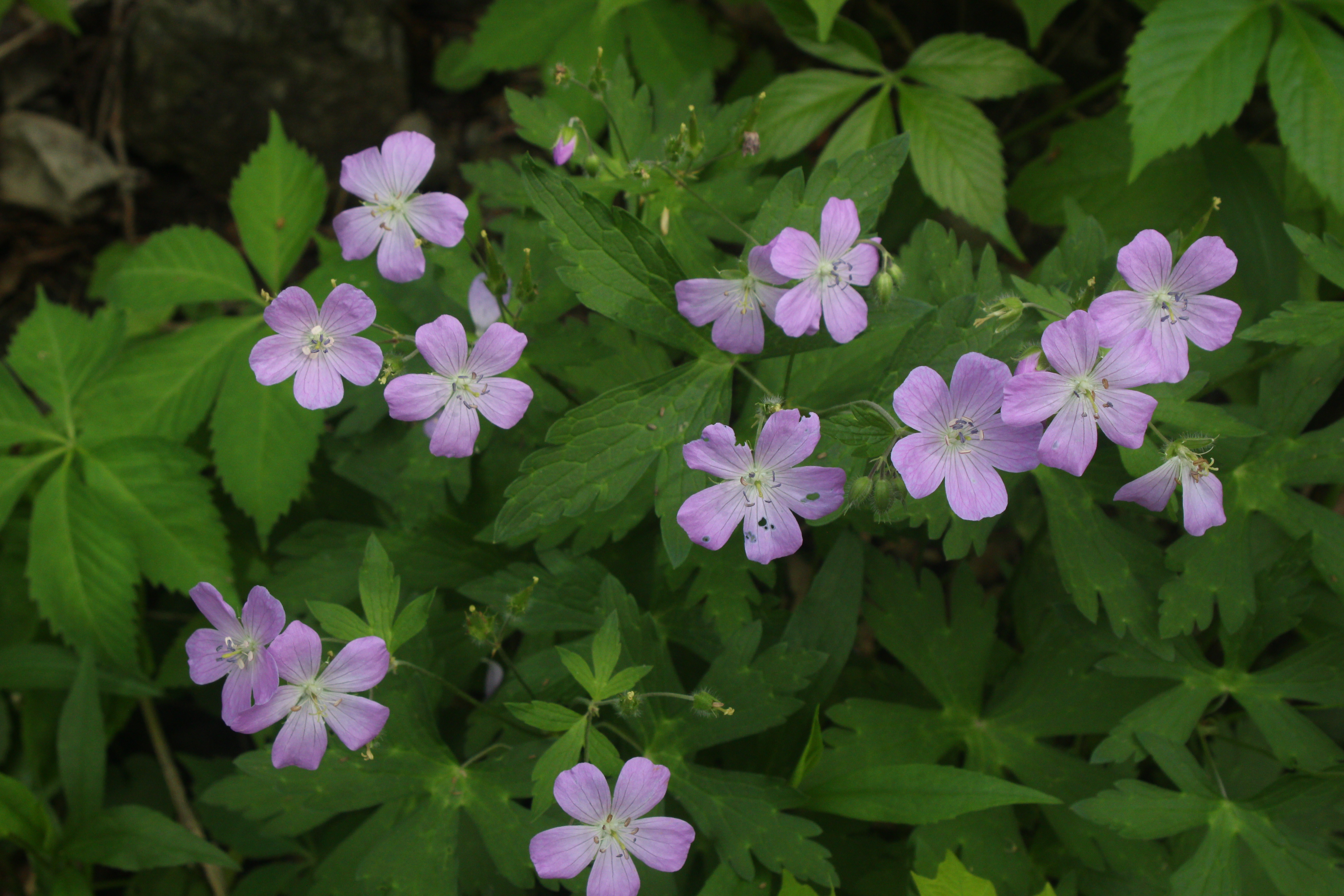
Wild Geranium, Angels Rest Cluster

The cluster's large tract of land supports species, such as black bear and some bird species, that require extensive tracts of unbroken forest for survival. Many species are at risk when their habitat becomes fragmented. For example, the cluster provides habitat for the Woodland Box Turtle which is common in Virginia. But highway kills, population fragmentation, and collecting for the pet trade, have raised concern about maintaining a sustainable population. A habitat, sufficiently large for a population of reproductive adults, is needed for their continued existence.

== Geologic history ==
The cluster is in the Ridge and Valley Province that extends along the western boundary of Virginia. The Ridge and Valley province is composed of long, relatively level-crested, ridges with highest elevations reaching over 3600 feet. The province marks the eastern boundary in the Paleozoic era of an older land surface on the east. It was uplifted and eroded during the Paleozoic with extensive folding and thrust-faulting. Resistant quartzite, conglomerates and sandstones form the ridge caps while less resistant shales and limestones eroded to form the intervening valleys. Whereas the Ridge and Valley province consists of mostly long parallel ridges, here the folding of the mountains formed an S-shaped curve. Pearis Mountain forms the top of the curve, Sugar Run Mountain the middle of the curve and Flat Top Mountain the bottom. Pearis Mountain continues northeast to the New River where it ends suddenly at Angels Rest. Wolf Creek Mountain continues southwest, ending at a gap, with the ridge continuing southeast, now named Rich Mountain.

The cluster includes the watershed of two creeks. Mill Creek drains into Wolf Creek, a tributary of the New River, and Dismal Creek flows in the opposite direction, into Kimberling Creek, then to Walker Cree, which is also a tributary of the New River. The junction of Kimberling Creek and Walker Creek, near the Route 670 crossing of Walker Creek, is a popular access for canoers starting down Walker Creek.

== Cultural history ==
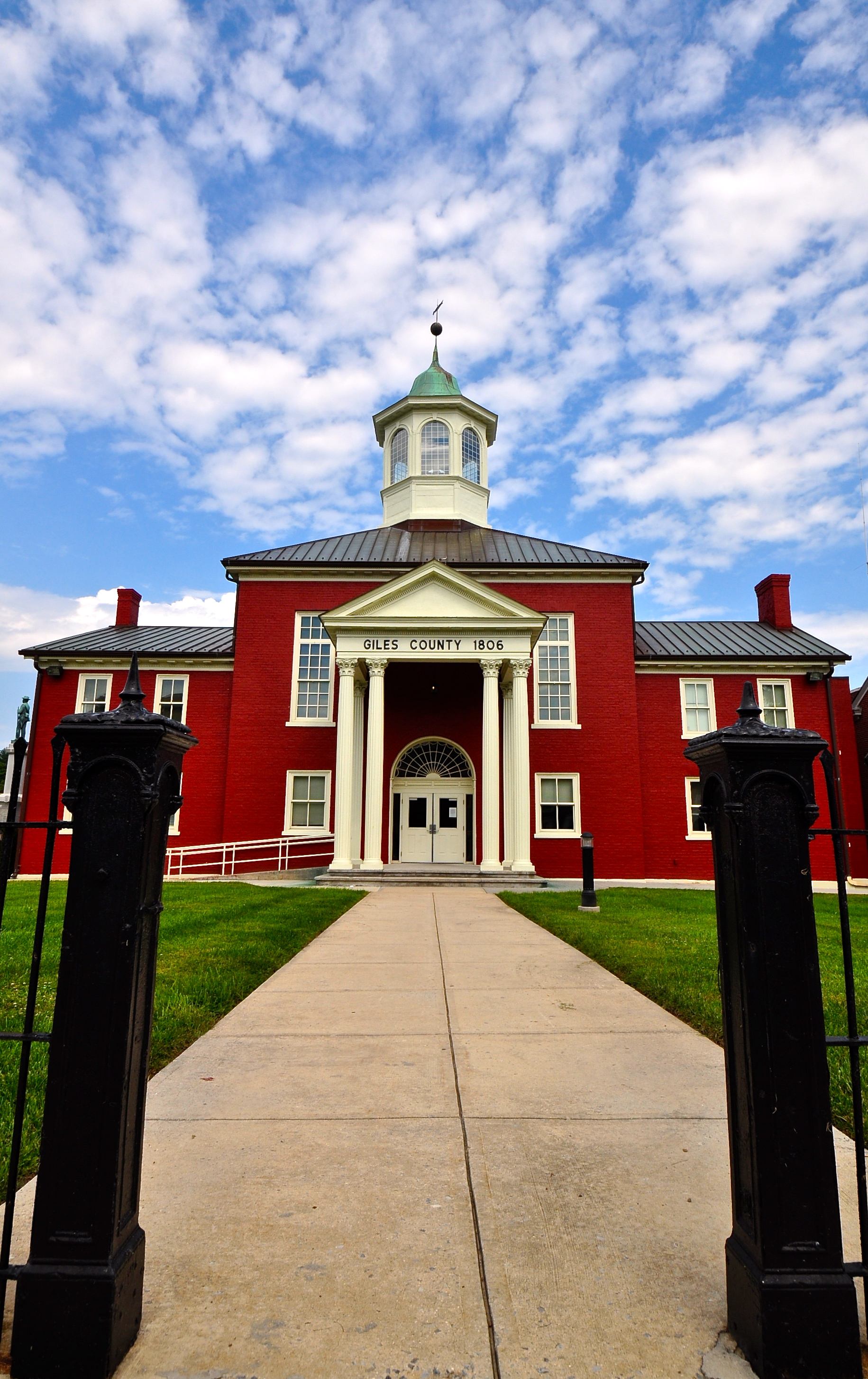
Giles County Courthouse - Front View

Settlers reached the towns of Narrows and Pearisburg as early as 1778. A ferry crossing the New River at Pearisburg was started in 1782 by Captain George Pearis. Pearis donated land, timber and stone for the construction of public buildings, including a courthouse that brought the town of Pearisburg into being. Narrows is near a deep, narrow gorge where the New River passes through the mountains. To block Union troops from passing through the gorge, the Confederate Army built a fort at Narrows with guns aimed at the gorge.

== See also ==
- Appalachian Trailhead Parking
- Endangered species in Giles County
- Endangered species in Bland County
- Narrows Commercial Historic District
- Pearisburg history
- Pearisburg Historic District

== Other clusters ==
Other clusters of the Wilderness Society's "Mountain Treasures" in the Jefferson National Forest (north to south):

- Glenwood Cluster
- Craig Creek Cluster
- Barbours Creek-Shawvers Run Cluster
- Sinking Creek Valley Cluster
- Mountain Lake Wilderness Cluster
- Walker Mountain Cluster
- Kimberling Creek Cluster
- Garden Mountain Cluster
- Mount Rogers Cluster
- Clinch Ranger District Cluster
