= Roadless area conservation =

Conservation policy

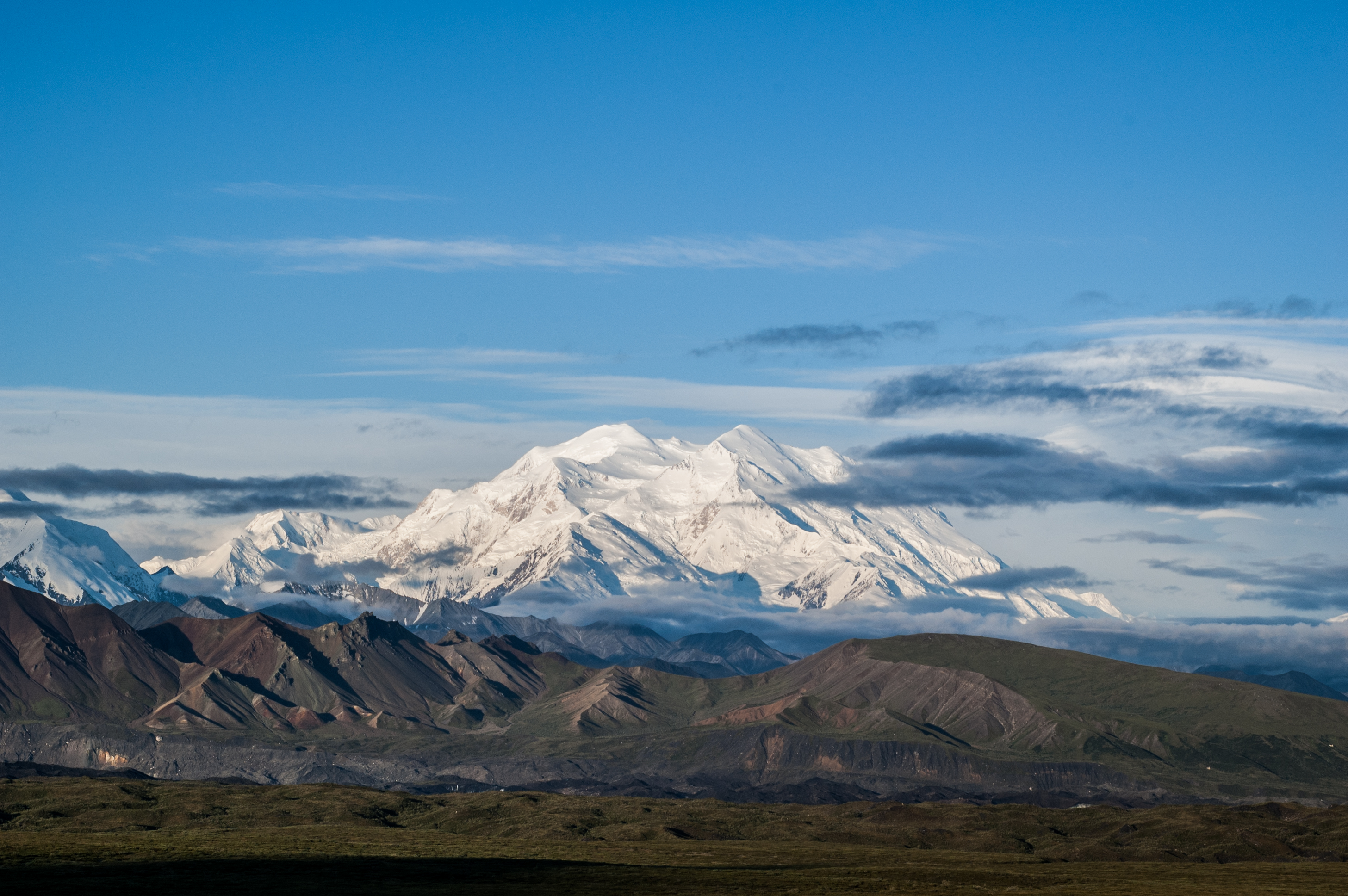
Denali National Park in Alaska is prized for both the mountain itself and its expansive roadless area.

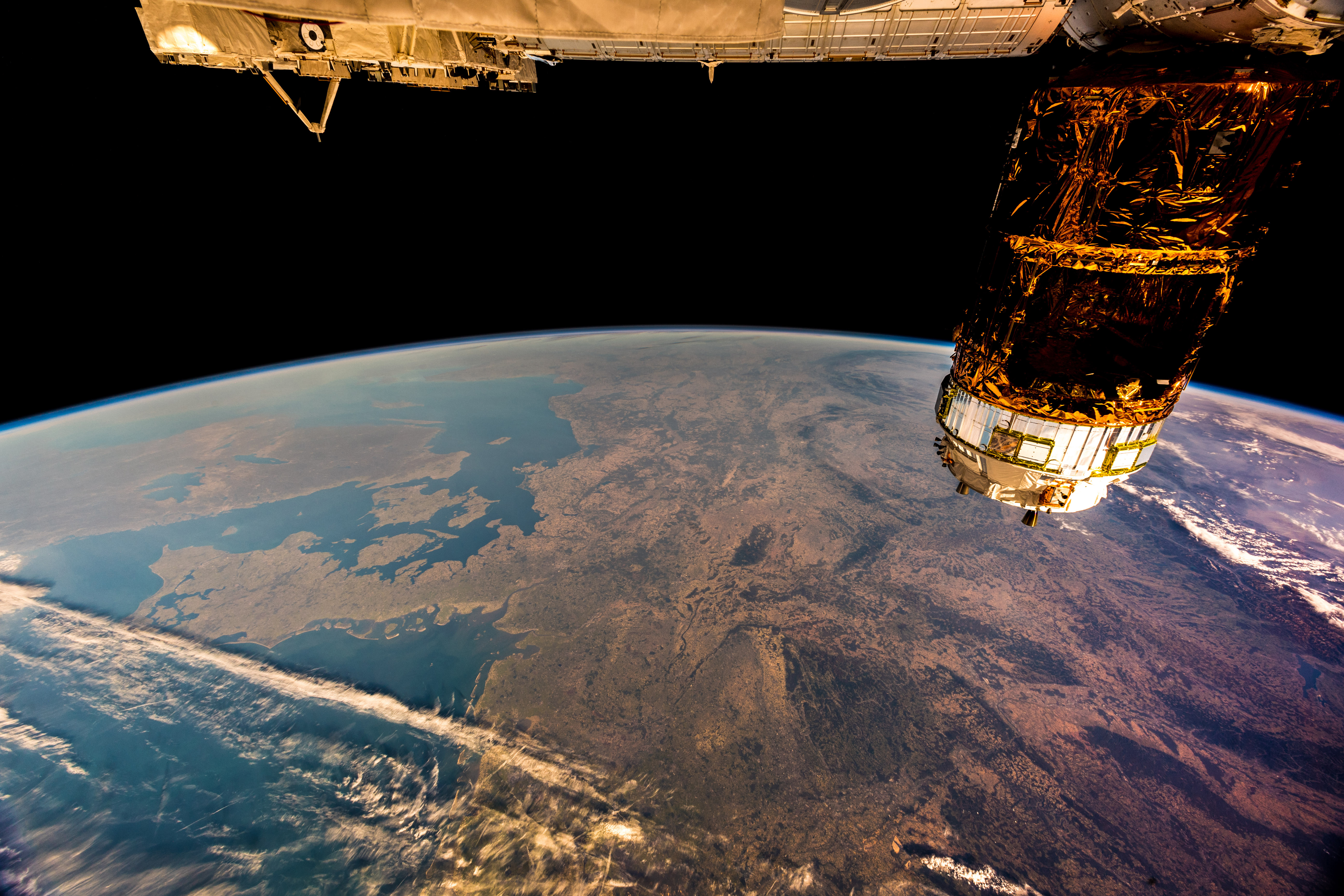
Deforestation in Europe, 2020. France is the most deforested country in Europe, with only 15% of the native vegetation remaining.

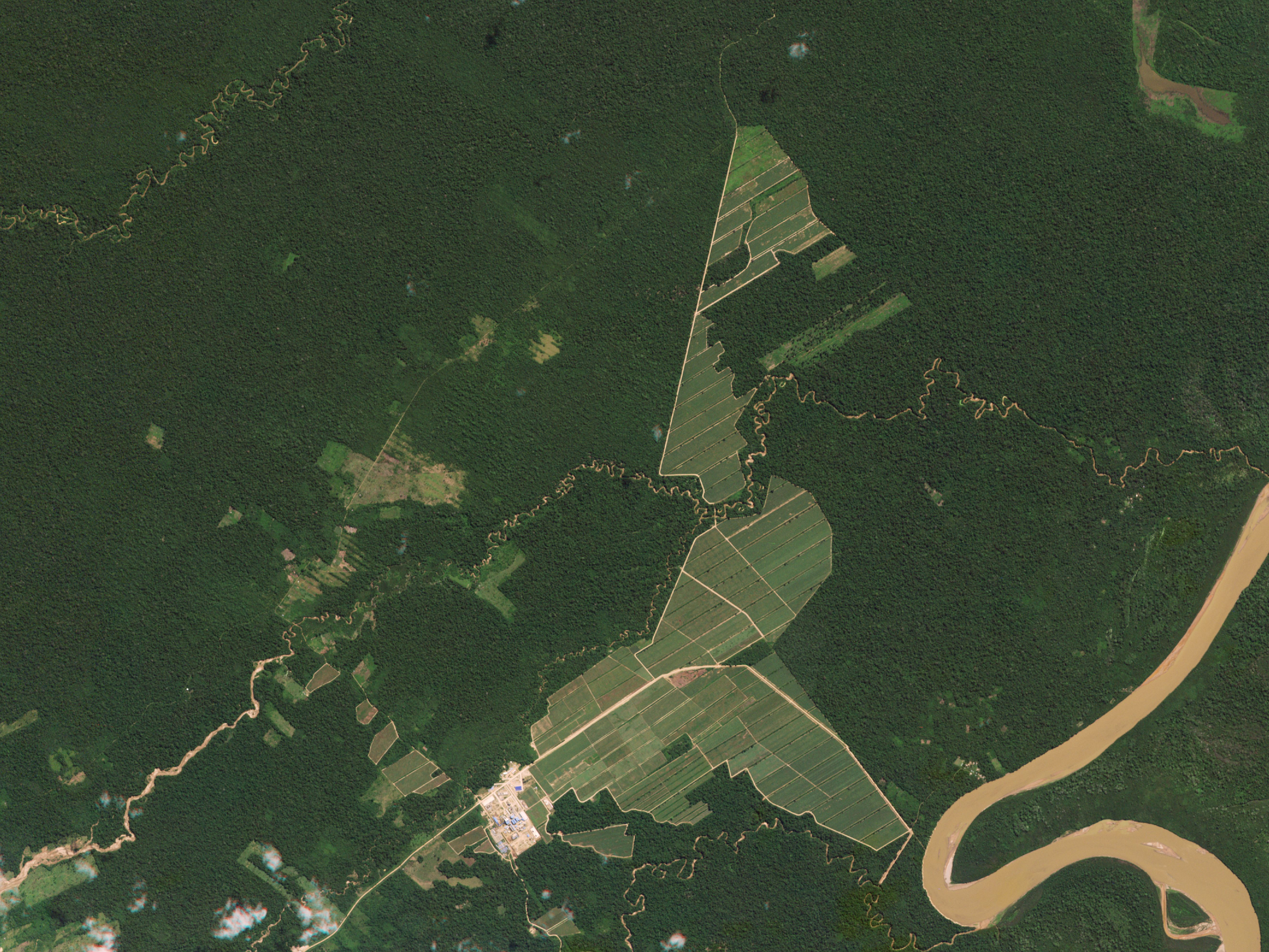
Deforestation in Bolivia, 2020

Roadless area conservation is a conservation policy limiting road construction and the resulting environmental impact on designated areas of public land. In the United States, roadless area conservation has centered on U.S. Forest Service areas known as inventoried roadless areas. The most significant effort to support the conservation of these efforts was the Forest Service 2001 Roadless Area Conservation Rule (Roadless Rule).

== Concept ==
Access roads provide important access to emergency services, convenient access for industry as well as for a variety of recreational activities, such as sightseeing, fishing, hunting, and off-roading. However, these activities can cause erosion, pollution, species loss, and loss of aesthetic appeal. In addition, the building of roads can lead to further development of "splinter roads" that take off from them, and the encroachment of human settlement and development in sensitive areas. As of 2026, the Roadless Rule protects over 82,000 miles (130,000 kms) of streams and rivers in the continental United States, and the water that drains these river watersheds supplies drinking water to at least 25 million Americans, with several states sourcing water for over one-third of their populations from these areas.

In the United States about 30% of National Forest lands in 38 states and Puerto Rico are roadless areas, making up 58.5 million acres (237,000 km^{2}). These areas provide critical habitat for more than 1,600 threatened, endangered, or sensitive plant and animal species. Roadless rules are also seen as a way to save taxpayers money. America's National Forests are currently covered with 386,000 miles (621,000 km) of roads, enough to encircle the earth 15 times. A $4.5-billion maintenance backlog exists on National Forest roads, according to the agency's own estimates.

One example of roadless area conservation is Alaska's Denali National Park, which is prized for its expansive roadless area. There is but one 90-mile (140 km) access road into the park; only official vehicles are permitted after 30 miles (48 km).

== In the United States ==
On January 12, 2001, after nearly three years of analysis, the U.S. Forest Service adopted the Roadless Area Conservation Rule to conserve 58.5 million acres (237,000 km^{2}) of pristine National Forests and Grasslands from most logging and road construction. When he entered office, the U.S. president at that time, George W. Bush, modified these regulations to allow a more autonomous approach, wherein state governments would be permitted to designate their own roadless areas.

On September 20, 2006, U.S. Magistrate Judge Elizabeth Laporte ruled against the Bush administration's plan to reverse the Clinton-era regulations, saying that the Bush plan "established a new regime in which management of roadless areas within the national forests would, for the first time, vary not just forest by forest but state by state. This new approach raises a substantial question about the rule's potential effect on the environment."

On November 29, 2006, Judge Laporte issued an order to ban road construction on 327 oil and gas leases issued by the Bush administration since January 2001, most of them in Colorado, Utah, and North Dakota—areas that were already protected before the Bush administration's reversal of the 2001 law.

On May 28, 2009, Secretary of Agriculture Tom Vilsack issued a directive giving the secretary of agriculture final authority on most road development and timber activity in National Forests, for a period of one year.

In 2011, a federal appeals court in Denver, Colorado, upheld the government's authority to prohibit Western states from building roads on public land. The unanimous ruling, issued by a three-judge panel, said a lower court had erred in finding for the State of Wyoming, the plaintiff in the case, and ordered that the rule be put into force nationally. Wyoming had argued that preventing road construction into or on national forests or other lands is a de facto wilderness designation, something that only Congress can do, and that the Forest Service had exceeded its own authority in trying to put the system into effect. "The Forest Service did not usurp Congressional authority because the roadless rule did not establish de facto wilderness," the court said in a decision written by Judge Jerome A. Holmes, who was nominated to the court by President George W. Bush.

The roadless rule is the law of the land after surviving its final legal challenge on March 25, 2013, when the U.S. District Court for the District of Columbia rejected the state of Alaska's challenge that, while aimed at the Tongass National Forest, would have nullified the national rule. The Alaska case was the final litigation challenging the rule nationwide. The court held that no further challenges are allowed, because the statute of limitations has run out.

Trump's Forest Service removed most of the Tongass National Forest from roadless area designation in October 2020, allowing road construction and logging in more than 9.3 million acres of forest. Clear-cut lands lose the carbon sink of old-growth forest, habitat for wildlife, and soil stability, causing landslides.

In January 2023, the USDA and Forest Service under the Biden administration restored protections of the Tongass National Forest under the roadless rule. In a statement announcing the finalization of the restoration of environmental protections, the agency wrote: "The Forest Service received about 112,000 comment documents—the vast majority of which were in favor of restoring roadless protections. The agency reviewed, analyzed and applied this input, alongside the input received during the October 2020 rulemaking, to inform USDA's final decision. USDA also consulted with Southeast Alaska Tribal Nations."

In June 2025, the Trump administration announced at a meeting of the Western Governors Association that it was working to rescind the national roadless rule.

== In literature ==
A notable American proponent of roadless wilderness areas was writer Edward Abbey in his book Desert Solitaire. In his essay "Industrial Tourism and the National Parks", Abbey describes road construction as "unnecessary or destructive development" and the loss of wilderness as a consequence of what he called "industrial tourism", where once-secluded natural areas become popularized and degraded.

== See also ==
- Inventoried roadless area
