= Inventoried roadless area =

Inventoried Roadless Areas are a group of United States Forest Service lands that have been identified by government reviews as lands without existing roads that could be suitable for roadless area conservation as wilderness or other non-standard protections. The Inventoried Roadless areas include approximately 60,000,000 acres (240,000 km^{2}) of land in 40 states and Puerto Rico. Most of these lands are in the western portion of the lower 48 states and Alaska. Idaho alone contains over 9 million acres (36,000 km^{2}) of inventoried roadless areas. The inventoried roadless areas range from large areas with wilderness characteristics to small tracts of land that are immediately adjacent to wilderness areas, parks and other protected lands.

== Roadless Area Review and Evaluations (RARE) ==
The first review of Forest Service roadless lands was started in 1967 after the creation of the Wilderness Act by Congress in 1964. This effort was called the “Roadless Area Review and Evaluation” or “RARE I”, and culminated in 1972 with a finding that 12,300,000 acres (50,000 km^{2}) that were suitable to be designated as wilderness. The RARE I recommendations were abandoned by the Forest Service after courts ruled that the agency had not sufficiently complied with the regulations of the National Environmental Policy Act (NEPA). A second roadless inventory, RARE II, was initiated in 1977, which culminated in a recommendation of wilderness designation for 15,000,000 acres (61,000 km^{2}) of national forest land and further study for another 10,800,000 acres (44,000 km^{2}). This set of recommendations was also quickly challenged in the courts and largely voided as a result.

== 2001 Roadless Rule ==
The most recent review of inventoried roadless areas began in 1998 under the oversight of Michael Dombeck, then head of the US Forest Service. This review was finished in 2000 and culminated in a set of Forest Service regulations in 2001 that are collectively known as the Roadless Rule. The rule does not specifically protect roadless areas from development nor does it strictly prohibit multiple use activities on these lands. Specifically, the rule was aimed at controlling the amount of road-building activities undertaken by the forest service, which has more miles of roads under its control than the US Interstate Highway System.

In 2008, conservationists marked the 10 year anniversary of the Roadless Area Conservation Rule with a panel of speakers headed by former US Forest Service Chief Michael Dombeck. At the event, Dombeck said, "In spite of seven years of Bush administration effort, roadless areas remain protected in the National Forests of the lower 48 states, but more litigation to remove protection is in progress with the outcome uncertain."

== Rationale for limiting road construction ==
The rationale for limiting road-building in the inventoried roadless areas was to minimize the negative environmental impacts of roads construction, maintenance, and automobile traffic. Over the past several decades, researchers have documented a wide range of impacts that roads have on the environment. In this sense, the roadless rule provided a great deal of protection to a large group of lands that previously had little protection within the current Forest Service administrative structure.

The second impetus for the creation of the Roadless Rule was an effort to expand the system of protected federal lands to include ecosystems that were not very well represented in the current system of National Parks, wilderness areas, and preserves. To a great degree, the current system of parks and wilderness areas in the US is very successful at preserving high elevation ecosystems, places that are rugged, beautiful and otherwise difficult to develop. The Roadless Area Review and Evaluation, and several studies since, concluded that ecosystems that exist at mid elevations are not well represented in the US system of protected lands, and many of the inventoried roadless areas include these areas. (Note: Several studies have found that ecosystems that exist between 3,000 and 11,000 feet (3,400 m) are not well represented in the protected area system. The two best efforts have been the following:)

== See also ==
- Roadless area conservation
