= Shawver =

Shawver may refer to:

== People with the surname ==
- AJ Smith-Shawver (born 2002), American baseball player
- Michael Shawver, American film editor
- Randall Shawver, American guitarist

== Places ==
- Shawvers Run Wilderness, protected area in the U.S. state of Virginia
- Shawver, West Virginia, unincorporated community in the United States
- Shawvers Crossing, West Virginia, unincorporated community in the United States
