= Newport Historic District =

Newport Historic District or Newport Downtown Historic District may refer to:

- Newport Downtown Historic District (New Hampshire)
- Newport Historic District (Newport, Pennsylvania)
- Newport Historic District (Rhode Island)
- Newport Downtown Historic District (Newport, Vermont)
- Newport Historic District (Newport, Virginia)

== See also ==
- East Row Historic District, Newport, Kentucky
- Greater Newport Rural Historic District, Newport, Virginia
- Newport (disambiguation)
