= Barbours Creek Wilderness Addition =

Protected natural area in Virginia, United States

- Location within Virginia
- Location: Craig County; Virginia, United States
- Coordinates: 37°38′27″N 80°3′23″W
- Area: 844 acres (342 ha)
- Administrator: U.S. Forest Service

Barbours Creek Wilderness Addition, a wildland in the George Washington and Jefferson National Forests of western Virginia, has been recognized by the Wilderness Society as a special place worthy of protection from logging and road construction. The Wilderness Society has designated the area as a "Mountain Treasure".

Next to the Barbours Creek Wilderness, the area extends the wilderness opportunity to an upland oak forest managed mainly for bear. There is a good walk along Potts Mountain.

The area is part of the Barbours Creek-Shawvers Run Cluster.

== Location and access ==
The area is located in the Appalachian Mountains of Southwestern Virginia, about 18 miles southwest of Covington, Virginia. Barbours Creek is on the south, Va 617 on the northwest, Va 621 on the northeast, and the James River Ranger District of the George Washington National Forest on the north and east.

There are no designated trails in the area. A 1.1 mile section of an unimproved road, FDR 5036, the Potts Creek Jeep Road, is on the western edge of the area. A parking lot for access to the area is located at the intersection of Va 617 and Potts Creek Road.

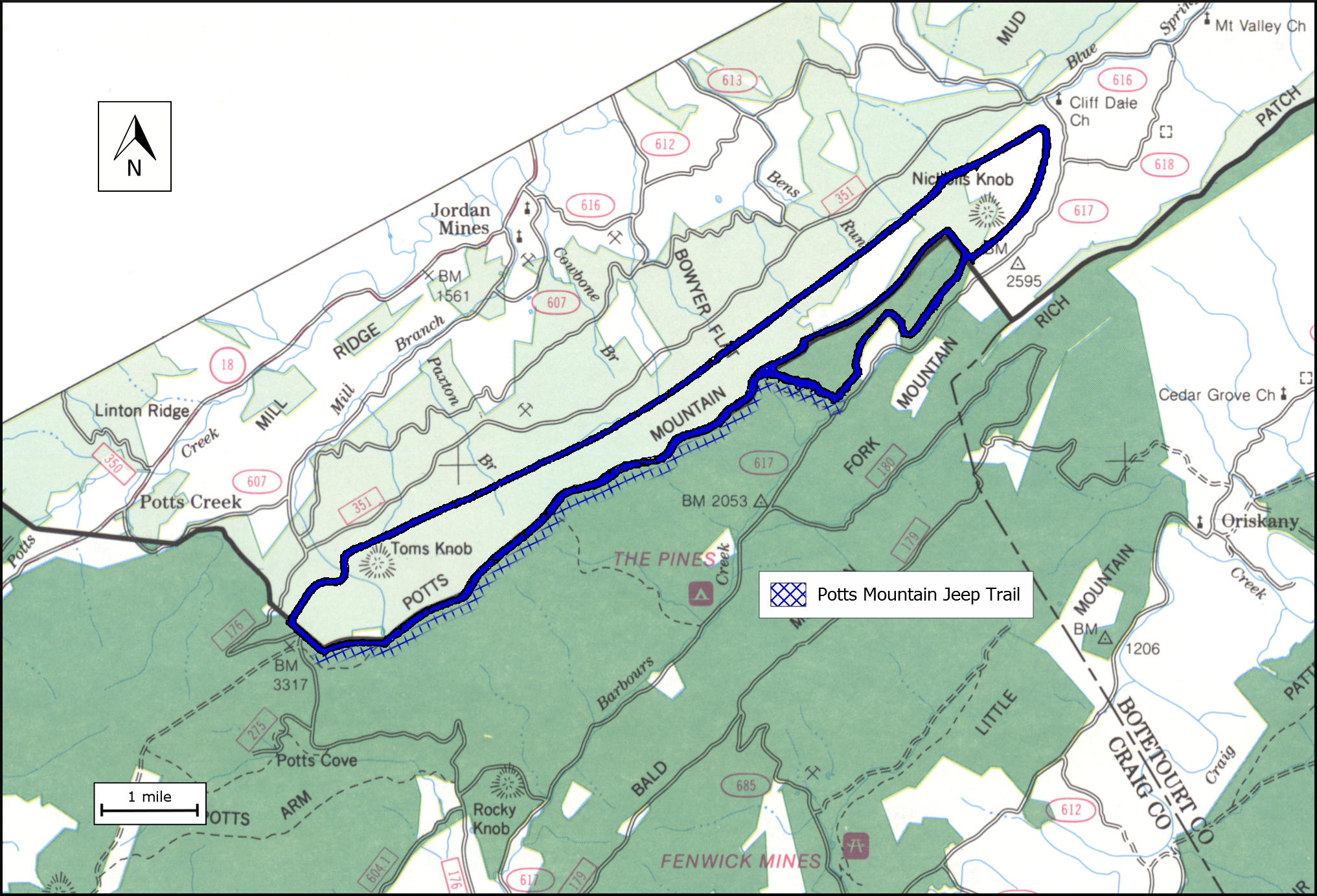
Boundary of the Barbours Creek addition as identified by the Wilderness Society

The boundary of the wildland, as determined by the Wilderness Society, is shown in the adjacent map. The outline on the map includes two areas: the Barbours Creek Wilderness Addition on the southeast; and the Toms Thumb wild area in the James River Ranger District on the west.

Additional roads and trails are given on National Geographic Maps 788 (Covington, Alleghany Highlands). A great variety of information, including topographic maps, aerial views, satellite data and weather information, is obtained by selecting the link with the wild land's coordinates in the upper right of this page.

Beyond maintained trails, old logging roads can be used to explore the area. The Appalachian Mountains were extensively timbered in the early twentieth century leaving logging roads that are becoming overgrown but still passable. Old logging roads and railroad grades can be located by consulting the historical topographic maps available from the United States Geological Survey (USGS). The Barbours Creek Wilderness Addition wild area is covered by USGS topographic map Jordan Mines.

== Natural history ==
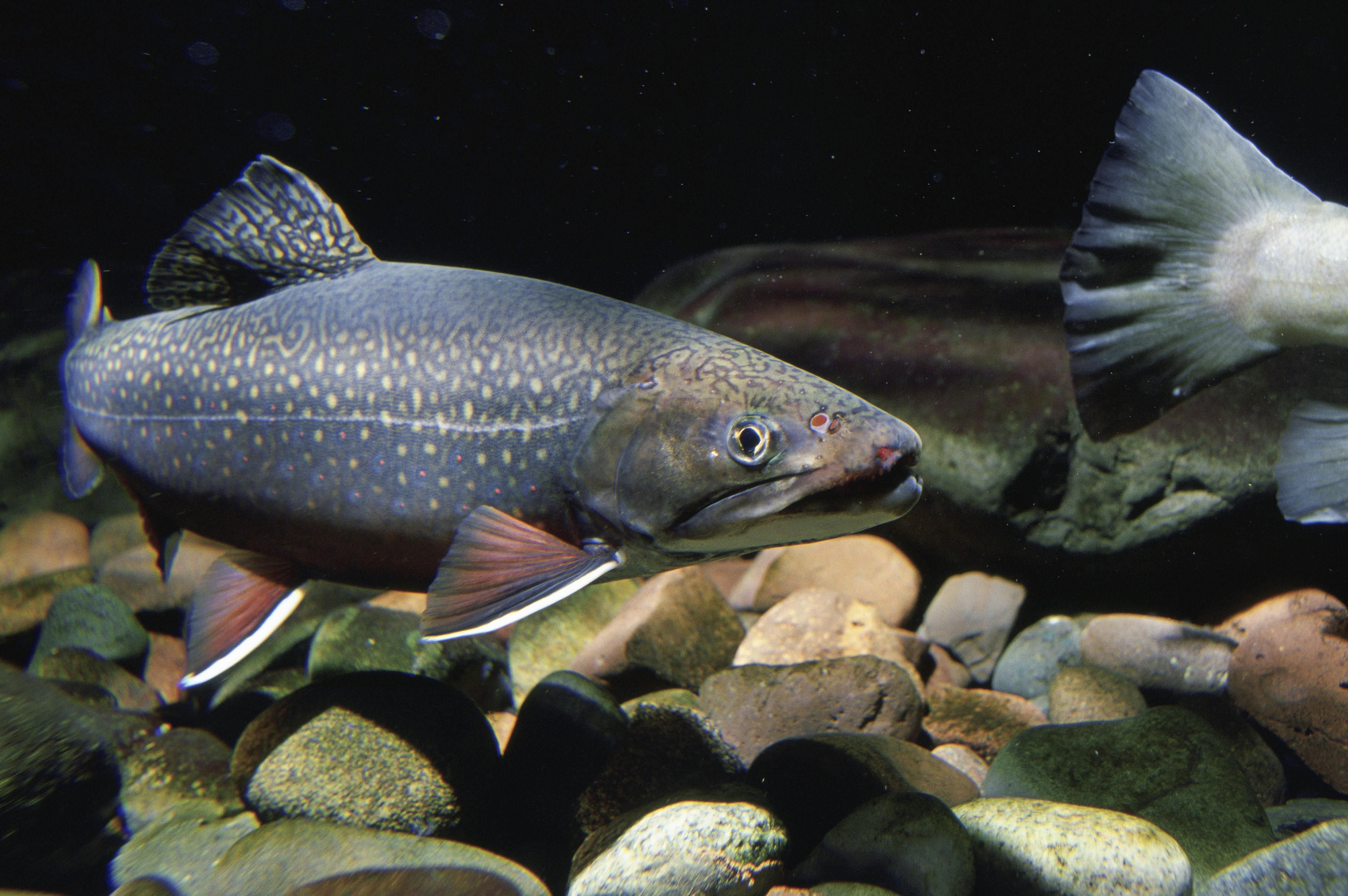
Brook trout

The area is within the Ridge and Valley Subsection of the Northern Ridge and Valley Section in the Central Appalachian Broadleaf Coniferous Forest-Meadow Province. Yellow poplar, northern red oak, white oak, basswood, cucumber tree, white ash, eastern hemlock and red maple are found in colluvial drainages, toeslopes and along flood plains of small to medium-sized streams. White oak, northern red oak, and hickory dominate on the north and west, while chestnut oak, scarlet oak and yellow pine are found on ridgetops and midslopes on the east.

Wild natural trout streams in Virginia are classified by the Department of Game and Inland Fisheries by their water quality, with class i the highest and class iv the lowest. Barboiurs Creek is a class ii stream.

The area contains a small tract of old-growth trees, 140 years old or older.

== Topography ==
The landscape is distinguished by ridges that trend northeast–southwest. The ridges, composed of sandstone or shale, have parallel drainages flowing into broad limestone valleys. Pine Mountain is typical with small steep sideslope drainages. The highest elevation is 3355 feet along the crest of Pine Mountain and the lowest elevation of about 2260 feet is at Barbours Creek.

Silurian-aged sandstone underlays about 75 percent of the area, with the remaining area underlain by Brallier and Martinsburg shale.

== Forest Service management ==
The Forest Service has conducted a survey of their lands to determine the potential for wilderness designation. Wilderness designation provides a high degree of protection from development. The areas that were found suitable are referred to as inventoried roadless areas. Later a Roadless Rule was adopted that limited road construction in these areas. The rule provided some degree of protection by reducing the negative environmental impact of road construction and thus promoting the conservation of roadless areas. Barbours Creek Wilderness Addition was inventoried in the roadless area review, and therefore protected from possible road construction and timber sales.

The forest service classifies areas under their management by a recreational opportunity setting that informs visitors of the diverse range of opportunities available in the forest. The area is managed as "Black Bear Habitat".

== See also ==
Barbours Creek-Shawvers Run Cluster
