= Shawvers Run Wilderness =

Wilderness area in Virginia, United States

- IUCN category Ib (wilderness area)
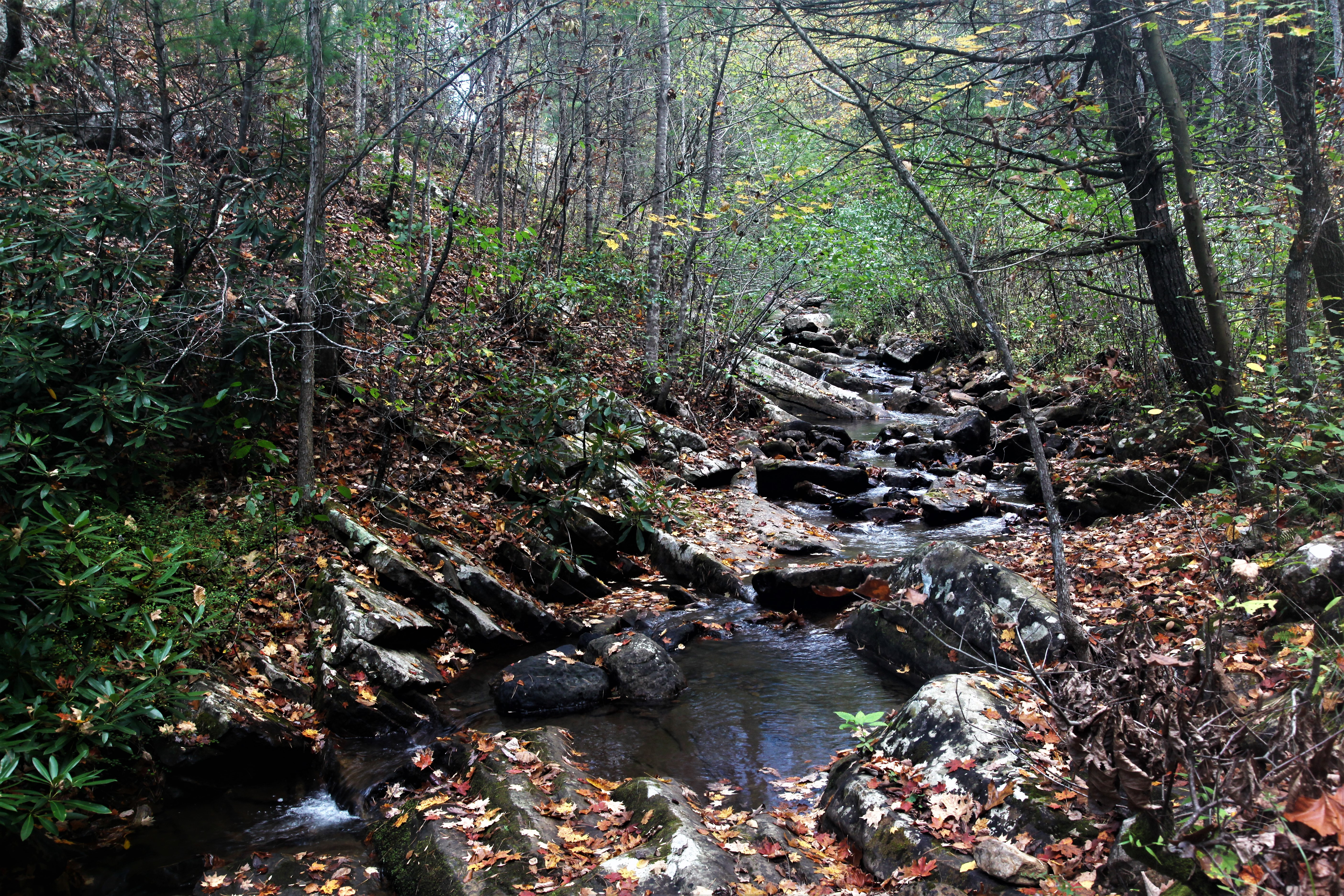
- Shawvers Run, from Va 607, 15 oct 17

- Location within Virginia
- Location: Craig County Virginia, United States
- Nearest city: Potts Creek, Virginia
- Coordinates: 37.58626°N 80.20569°W
- Area: 5,784 acres (2,341 ha)
- Established: 1988
- Administrator: U.S. Forest Service

The Shawvers Run Wilderness, a 5784-acre area located less than one mile south of Potts Creek, Virginia, is protected by the Eastern Wilderness Act of Congress to maintain its present, natural condition. As part of the National Wilderness Preservation System, it helps to preserve a variety of natural life forms and contributes to a diversity of plant and animal gene pools. Over half of the ecosystems in the United States exist within designated wilderness.

A viewpoint on Hanging Rock overlooks the Shawvers Run Wilderness, Hanging Rock Valley, Peters Mountain Wilderness, and Potts Creek Valley.

The area is part of the Barbours Creek-Shawvers Run Cluster.

== Location and access ==
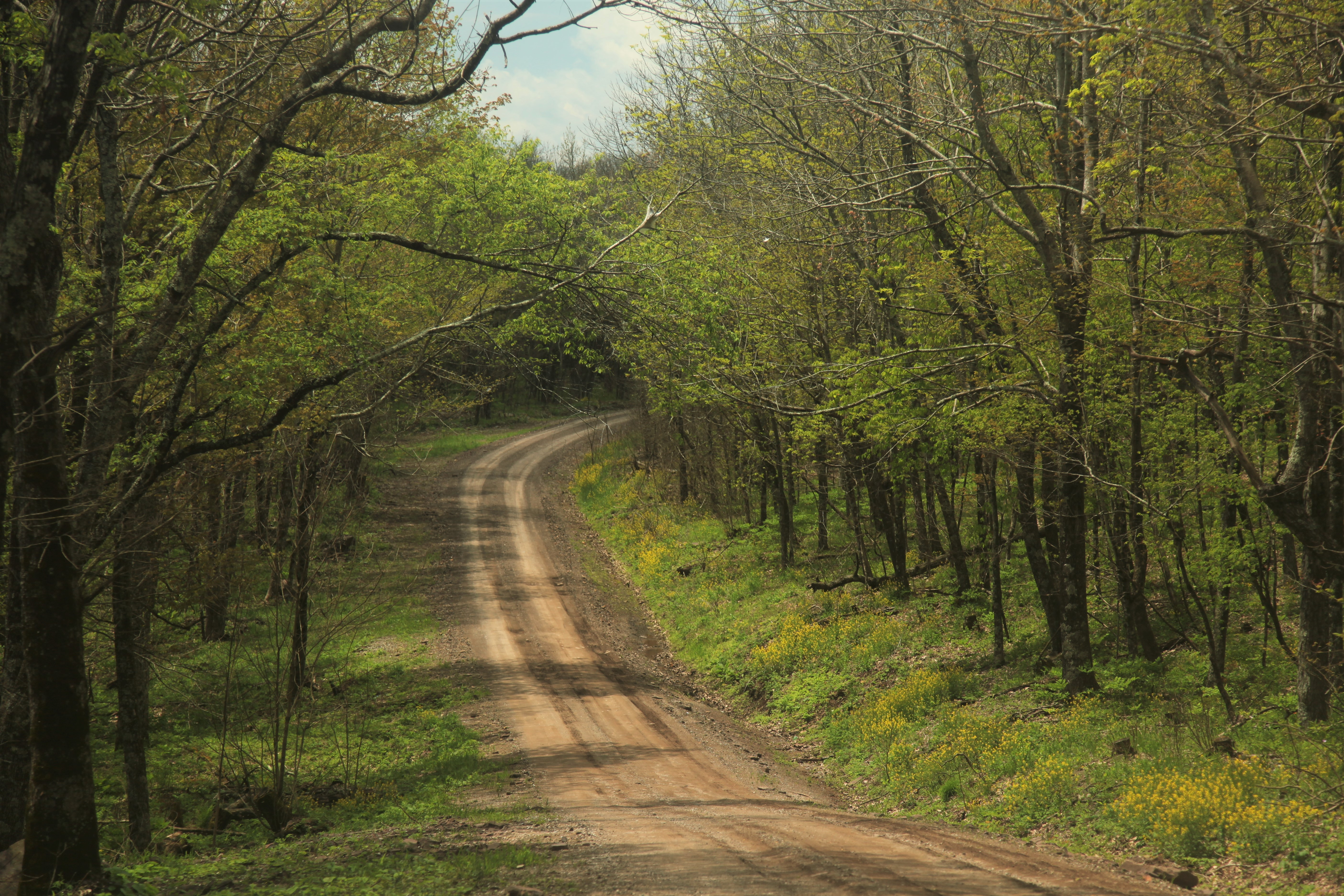
Potts Mountain Rd (Forest Service Rd 177-1) next to Shawvers Run Wilderness in southwest Virginia

Located in the Eastern Divide Ranger District of the Jefferson National Forest, the wilderness falls between the crest of Potts Mountain on the southeast and Va 18 on the northwest.

The only official trail in the area, the Hanging Rock Trail, is a 0.7 mile hike to a viewpoint over the area from Hanging Rock. The trailhead is on Forest Service Road 177–1.

The Valley Branch Trail is an unofficial trail, 2.7 miles long, with a trailhead on Forest Service Road 177-1

== Natural history ==
Populations of native brook trout are found in Valley Branch Creek and Shawvers Run. Besides the oak-hickory forest common to the Jefferson Forest, the wilderness contains poplar, birch, hemlock and white pine along Valley Branch, and, in the dry section to the west of Potts Mountain, Virginia pine and chestnut oak.

The slopes of the wilderness provide watershed protection for the federally endangered James River spinymussel found in Potts Creek.

== Topography ==
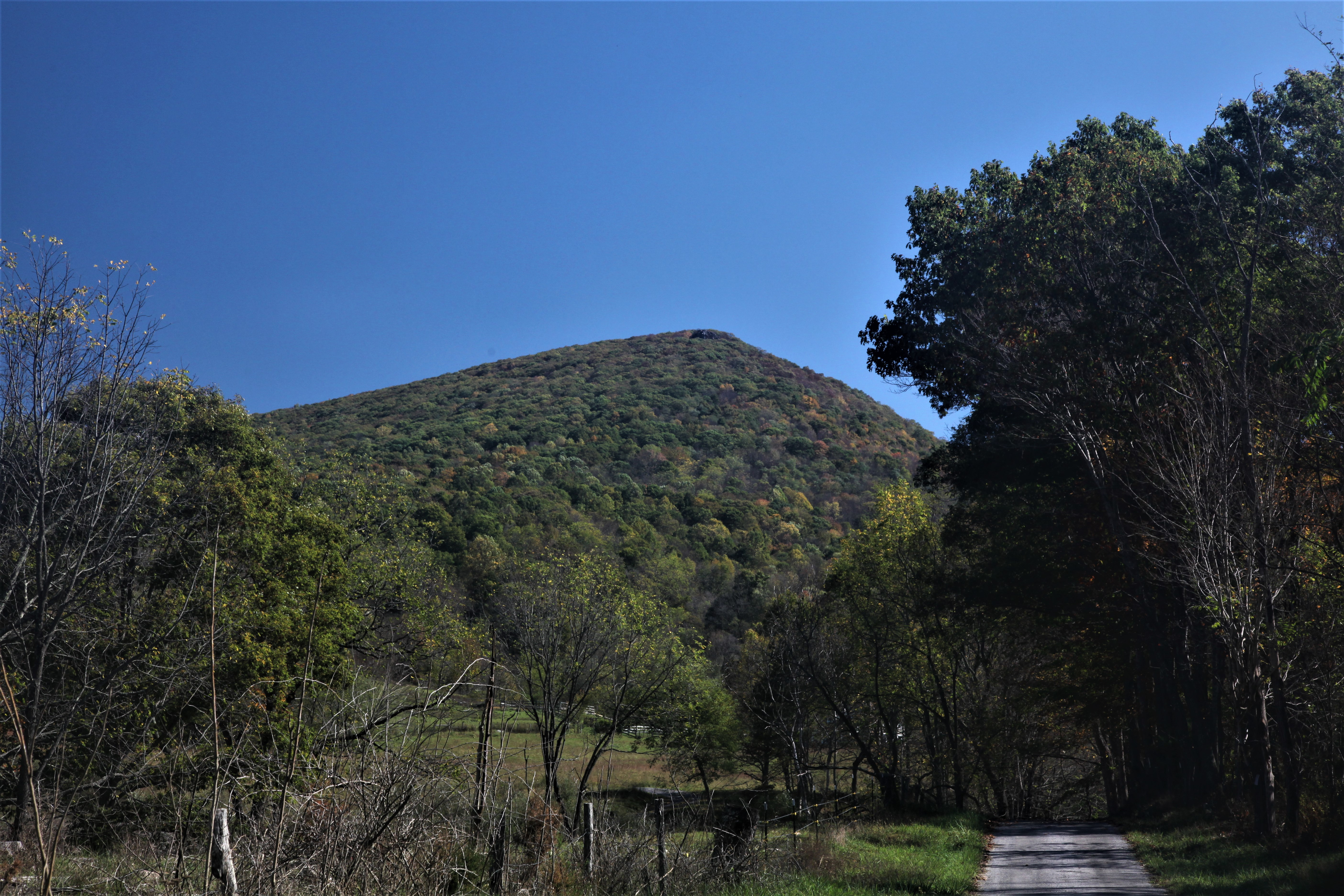
Hanging Rock viewed from Va 603 in Hanging Rock Valley

The wilderness lies on the western slope of Potts Mountain, in the Ridge and Valley Province of Virginia and West Virginia. The terrain is a complex anticlinal structure capped by erosion-resistant Silurian sandstone. The mountain ridge is about 3700 feet in elevation without prominent knobs; the lowest elevation is along Shawvers Run at about 2000 feet. Shawvers Run and Valley Branch are the two largest waterways draining the area.

The southwestern end of the wilderness surrounds Hanging Rock Valley, part of a karst system with large caves including the two-mile long Patton Cave and Panther Cave.

== Nearby wild areas ==
- Hoop hole
- Barbours Creek Wilderness Addition
- Potts Arm

== See also ==
Barbours Creek-Shawvers Run Cluster
