= Potts Arm =

Protected natural area in Virginia, United States

- Location within Virginia
- Location: Craig County; Virginia, United States
- Coordinates: 37°34′17″N 80°9′25″W
- Area: 4,283 acres (17.33 km^{2})
- Administrator: U.S. Forest Service

Potts Arm, a wildland in the George Washington and Jefferson National Forests of western Virginia, has been recognized by the Wilderness Society as a special place worthy of protection from logging and road construction. The Wilderness Society has designated the area as a "Mountain Treasure".

Named after a spur extending off the main ridge of Potts Mountain, the area is popular with hunters, hikers, and anglers. Near the point where Potts Arm merges with Potts Mountain, there are good views in winter of Catawba Mountain.

The area is part of the Barbours Creek-Shawvers Run Cluster.

== Location and access ==
The area is located in the Appalachian Mountains of Southwestern Virginia, about 26 miles southwest of Covington, Virginia. Forest Road 604.1 is on the southeast; Potts Jeep Road, Forest Road 177.1, is on the east; and Sweet Springs Turnpike, Forest Road 176. is on the north and east. Forest Road 176 is between the area and the Barbours Creek Wilderness

There are two designated trails in the area.

- Potts Arm, Forest Trail, 3.9 miles
- Potts Cove Trail, 1.67 miles

Cove Road, Forest Road 275, gives access to Potts Cove.

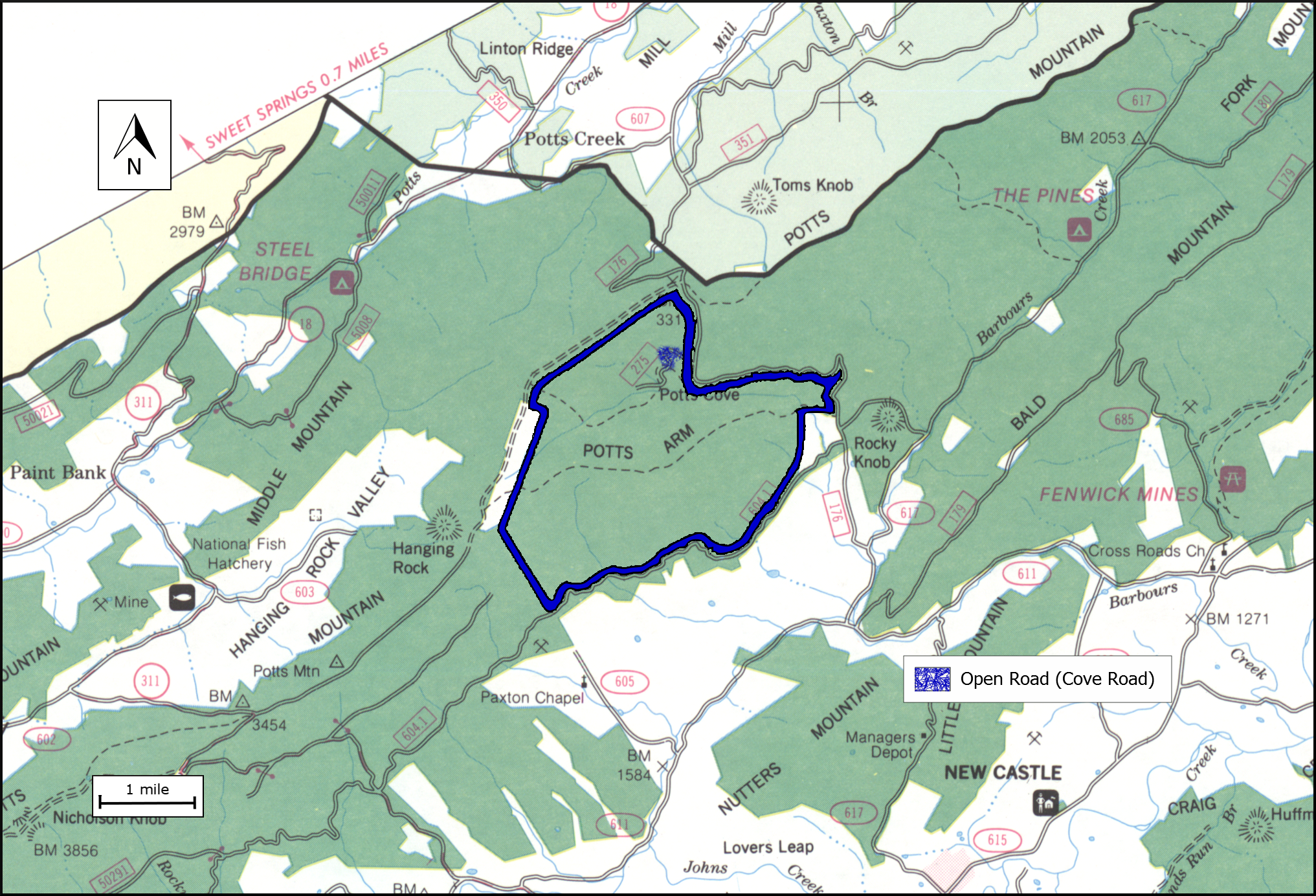
Boundary of the Potts Arm wild area as identified by the Wilderness Society

The boundary of the wildland, as determined by the Wilderness Society, is shown in the adjacent map. Additional roads and trails are given on National Geographic Maps 788 (Covington, Alleghany Highlands). A great variety of information, including topographic maps, aerial views, satellite data and weather information, is obtained by selecting the link with the wild land's coordinates in the upper right of this page.

Beyond maintained trails, old logging roads can be used to explore the area. The Appalachian Mountains were extensively timbered in the early twentieth century leaving logging roads that are becoming overgrown but still passable. Old logging roads and railroad grades can be located by consulting the historical topographic maps available from the United States Geological Survey (USGS). The Potts Arm wild area is covered by USGS topographic maps New Castle and Potts Creek.

== Natural history ==
The area is within the Ridge and Valley Subsection of the Northern Ridge and Valley Section in the Central Appalachian Broadleaf Coniferous Forest-Meadow Province.

Potts Cove, in the center of the area, has been designated a "Rare Community". It has some 140-year-old stands of old growth forest.

== Topography ==
Potts Arm, a 3282 -foot-high spur off the main ridge of Potts Mountain, is the highest elevation in the area.

Cove Branch, Wright Branch and Cold Spring Branch drain into Barbours Creek, a tributary of Craig Creek which is part of the James River watershed.

== Forest Service management ==
The Forest Service has conducted a survey of their lands to determine the potential for wilderness designation. Wilderness designation provides a high degree of protection from development. The areas that were found suitable are referred to as inventoried roadless areas. Later a Roadless Rule was adopted that limited road construction in these areas. The rule provides some degree of protection by reducing the negative environmental impact of road construction and thus promoting the conservation of roadless areas. Potts Arm was not inventoried in the roadless area review, and therefore not protected from possible road construction and timber sales.

The forest service classifies areas under their management by a recreational opportunity setting that informs visitors of the diverse range of opportunities available in the forest. Most of the area is managed as "Dispersed Recreation Area – Unsuitable" which allows some commercial logging but not regular timber production. Areas along Peaceful Valley East Road on the south and Sweet Springs Turnpike on the east are designated "Mix of Successional Habitats." There is an area designated "Indiana Bat-Secondary Habitat" on the western end.".

== See also ==
- Barbours Creek-Shawvers Run Cluster
