= Newport Historic District (Newport, Virginia) =

Historic district in Virginia, United States

- U.S. National Register of Historic Places
- U.S. Historic district
- Virginia Landmarks Register
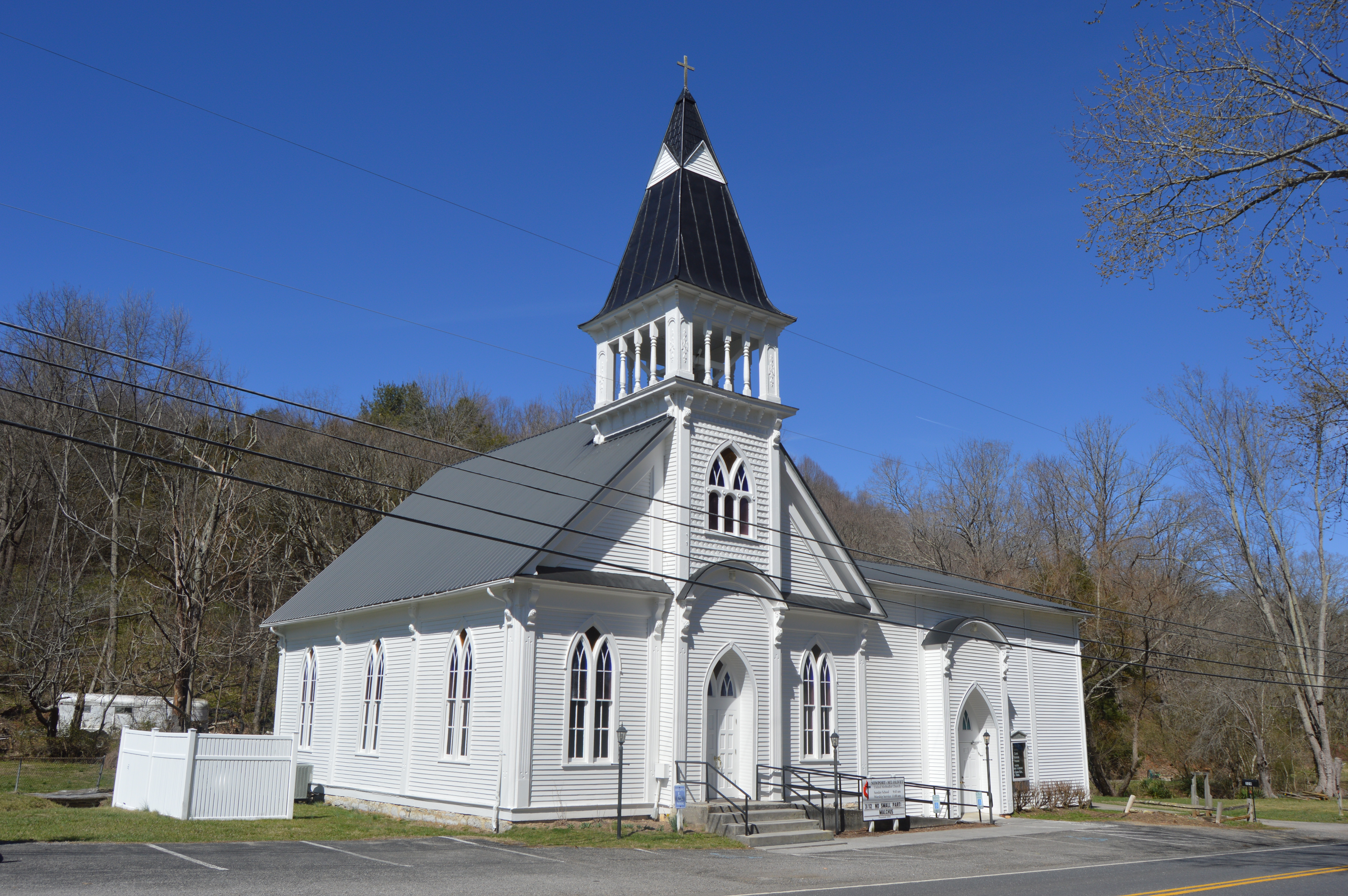
- Newport-Mount Olivet United Methodist Church

- Location within Virginia Location within the United States
- Location: Area surrounding Greenbriar Branch Rd. and State Route 42, Newport, Virginia
- Coordinates: 37°17′36″N 80°29′46″W
- Area: 35 acres (14 ha)
- Built: 1832
- Architect: Multiple
- Architectural style: Multiple
- NRHP reference No.: 94000059
- VLR No.: 035-0151

Significant dates
- Added to NRHP: February 25, 1994
- Designated VLR: December 8, 1993

Newport Historic District is a national historic district located at Newport, Giles County, Virginia. It encompasses 50 contributing buildings and 3 contributing sites in the rural village of Newport. The district includes primarily freestanding single-family dwellings or store buildings of one or two stories, featuring wood-frame construction, wood siding or ornamental metal sheathing, front porches, and associated outbuildings. Notable buildings include the Epling-Dunkley[or Dunklee]-Smith House (1820s-1830s), Keister-Miller House (1846), Robert Payne House (1850s), Payne-Price House, the Miller Building (c. 1902), the Pent Taylor Store (c. 1902), the Miller Brothers General Mercantile Store (c. 1902), F.E. Dunkley [Dunklee] Store (c. 1902–1903), Pasterfield House (1903), Dr. Walter Miller House (1903-1904), Albert Price House (1904), Methodist Parsonage (1909), Newport Methodist Church (1850s, 1906), and Sinking Creek Valley Bank (1927).

It was listed on the National Register of Historic Places in 1994. It is included in the Greater Newport Rural Historic District.
