= Rough Mountain Wilderness =

Wilderness area in Virginia, United States

- IUCN category Ib (wilderness area)
- Location within Virginia
- Location: Bath / Alleghany, Virginia, United States
- Coordinates: 37°54′50″N 79°41′51″W
- Area: 9,300 acres (38 km^{2})
- Elevation: 3,400 ft (1,000 m)
- Established: 1987
- Operator: George Washington and Jefferson National Forests
- Website: George Washington and Jefferson National Forests – Rough Mountain Wilderness Area

Rough Mountain Wilderness is a U.S. Wilderness Area in the Warm Springs Ranger District of the George Washington and Jefferson National Forests. The wilderness area is located on Rough Mountain and consists of 9,300 acres (38 km^{2}). Rough Mountain Wilderness ranges in elevation from 1,150 feet (351 m) to 2,842 feet (866 m) at Griffin Knob. The area has only one established hiking trail within its boundaries, and is characterized by steep slopes heading up to the ridgeline of Rough Mountain.

== Recreation ==
Rough Mountain Wilderness is so difficult to access that it never receives much use other than during hunting season. In addition, the only reliable water sources exist just outside the Wilderness's boundaries and there are few flat spots suitable for camping. The only established trail in the Rough Mountain Wilderness, the Crane Trail, starts from possibly "the most remote trailhead" in the George Washington National Forest. The trail itself only 3 miles long, but requires an out and back hike because private homes and hunting camps block access to Virginia State Route 42 at the western end of the trail. The eastern trailhead is located next to railroad tracks leased by the Buckingham Branch Railroad from CSX Transportation, so access to the trail from either terminus may not be possible without trespassing.

It may also be possible to bushwack across the ridge of Rough Mountain to Griffith Knob starting from a parking lot north of the Wilderness boundaries. This hike requires a 2.6 mile trek through an adjoining nonwilderness roadless area before reaching the Wilderness boundary. It has been described as possibly "the loneliest hike in Virginia" in one guidebook.

== See also ==
- List of U.S. Wilderness Areas
- Wilderness Act
