= Hoop hole =

Protected natural area in Virginia, United States

Hoop Hole
- Location within Virginia
- Location: Botetourt County; Virginia, United States
- Coordinates: 37°41′27″N 79°54′47″W
- Area: 5,625 acres (22.76 km^{2})
- Administrator: U.S. Forest Service

Hoop Hole, a wildland in the George Washington and Jefferson National Forests of western Virginia, has been recognized by the Wilderness Society as a special place worthy of protection from logging and road construction. The Wilderness Society has designated the area as a "Mountain Treasure".

Popular with hunters and anglers, the area has a National Recreation Trail that offers outstanding views of streams and waterfalls.

The area is part of the Barbours Creek-Shawvers Run Cluster.

== Location and access ==
The area is located in the Appalachian Mountains of Southwestern Virginia, about 8 miles southeast of Covington, Virginia. It is bounded by Va 615 on the southeast and Va 621 on the northeast.

Trails into the area include:

- Hoop Hole National Recreation Trail; Forest Trail 5001; 9.0 miles; difficult; blue-blazed; hiking, horseback riding, mountain biking
- Iron Ore Trail, Forest Trail 5004; 2.4 miles; moderate; yellow blazed hiking, horseback riding, mountain biking

A 1.1 mile section of The Potts Jeep Road, unimproved FDR 5036, is on the western edge of the area. The state of Virginia has designated Va 615 on the southeast as a Virginia Byway.

The Roaring Run Trail and Roaring Run Recreation Area are on the northeastern corner of the area.

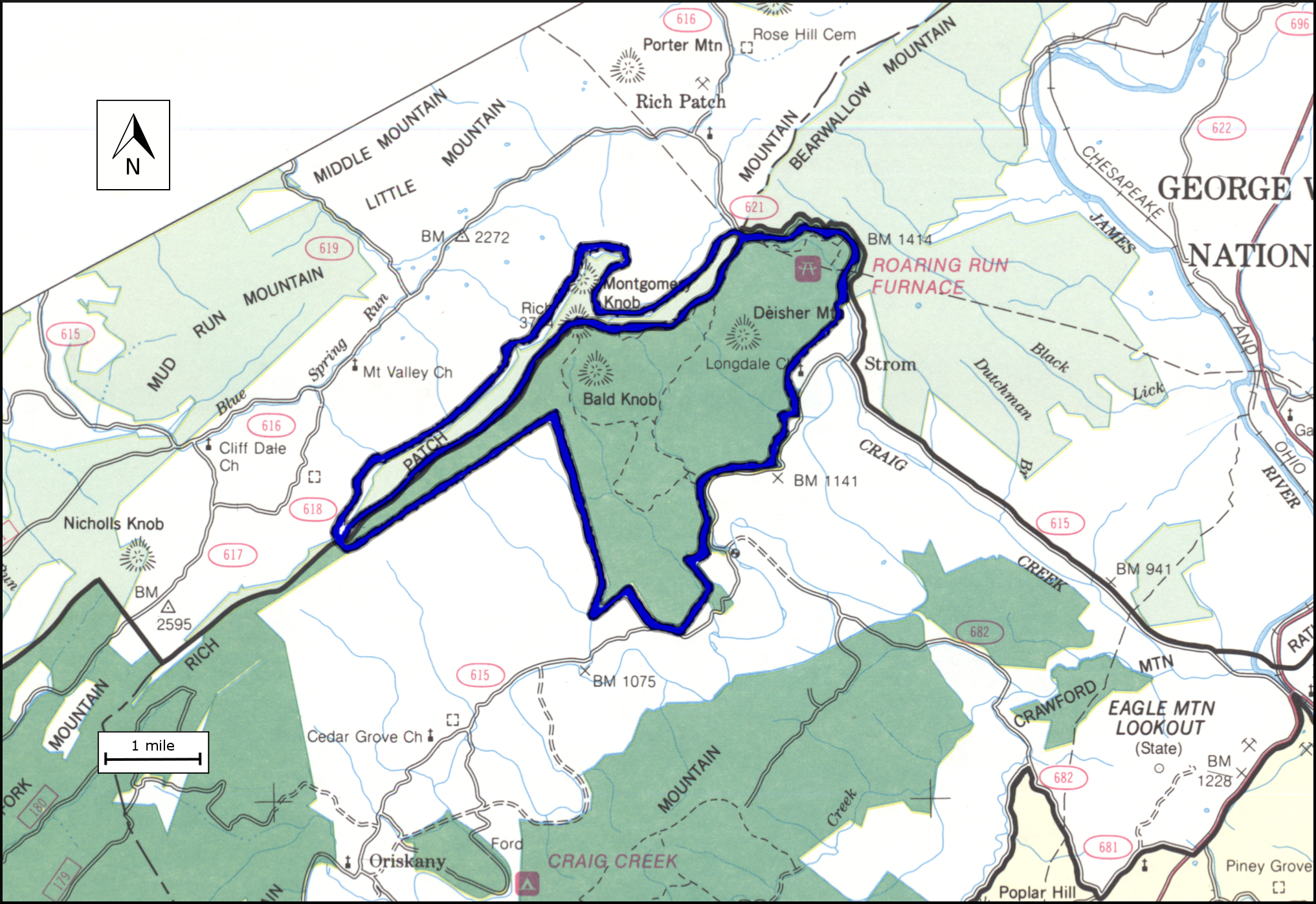
Boundary of the Hoop Hole wildland as identified by the Wilderness Society

The boundary of the wildland, as determined by the Wilderness Society, is shown in the adjacent map. The map shows one-third of the area in the James River Ranger District of the George Washington National Forest and the two-thirds in the New Castle Ranger District of the Jefferson National Forest. Additional roads and trails are given on National Geographic Maps 788 (Covington, Alleghany Highlands). A great variety of information, including topographic maps, aerial views, satellite data and weather information, is obtained by selecting the link with the wild land's coordinates in the upper right of this page.

Beyond maintained trails, old logging roads can be used to explore the area. The Appalachian Mountains were extensively timbered in the early twentieth century leaving logging roads that are becoming overgrown but still passable. Old logging roads and railroad grades can be located by consulting the historical topographic maps available from the United States Geological Survey (USGS). The Hoop Hole wild area is covered by USGS topographic map Strom.

== Natural history ==
The area is within the Ridge and Valley Subsection of the Northern Ridge and Valley Section in the Central Appalachian Broadleaf Coniferous Forest-Meadow Province. Yellow poplar, northern red oak, white oak, basswood, cucumber tree, white ash, eastern hemlock and red maple are found in colluvial drainages, toeslopes and along flood plains of small to medium-sized streams. White oak, northern red oak, and hickory dominate on the north and west, while chestnut oak, scarlet oak and yellow pine are found on ridgetops and midslopes on the south and east.

Unusual flora and fauna found in the area include a globally rare shrub, the pirate bush; and an invertebrate the orangefin madtom. Featured species include bear, deer and grouse.

There are stands of pure table mountain pine, mostly on southeast to southwest facing ridges and slopes with dry, well-drained soils; and there are areas of mixed oak and table mountain pine. Table mountain pine requires fire to regenerate because it has serotinous cones that need heat to open and disperse its seeds. Management of these areas require prescribed burns in order to maintain the forest in its present condition.

Old growth trees 140 years old or older are in the George Washington National Forest section of the area.

There have been numerous convictions for poaching in the area.

== Topography ==
The area is distinguished by ridges that trend northeast–southwest. The ridges, composed of sandstone or shale, have parallel drainages flowing into broad limestone valleys. Rich Patch, Pine and Deisher Mountains are typical with small steep sideslope drainages. The highest elevation is 3728 feet along the crest of Rich Patch Mountain while the lowest elevation of about 3000 feet is at Crawford Branch on the east.

Silurian-aged sandstone underlays about 75 percent of the area, with the remaining area underlain by Brallier and Martinsburg shale.

The area includes the headwaters of Hipes Branch, Stony Run, Wolf Branch, Crawford Branch, and Deisher Branch.

== Roaring Run Recreation Area ==
Located at the northeastern corner of the wild area, the Roaring Run Branch Recreation Area is a trailhead for the Iron Ore trail, as well as several trails leading along Roaring Run with views of Roaring Run Falls. The Roaring Run Wildflower Trail leads to a scenic waterfall where Roaring Run drops 35 feet over rock ledges. The moist environment along the trail and its orientation toward the sun create a habitat for the most diverse collection of wildflowers in the New Castle Ranger District. Among the flowers found here are the showy orchis, the crested dwarf iris, jack-in-the pulpit, bloodroot, black-eyed susan, trout lily and many varieties of trillium. The spring and summer season bring woodland birds including the wood thrush, ovenbird, white-eyed vireo, pine warblers, worm-eating warblers, blue-gray gnatcatchers, and white-breasted nuthatches.

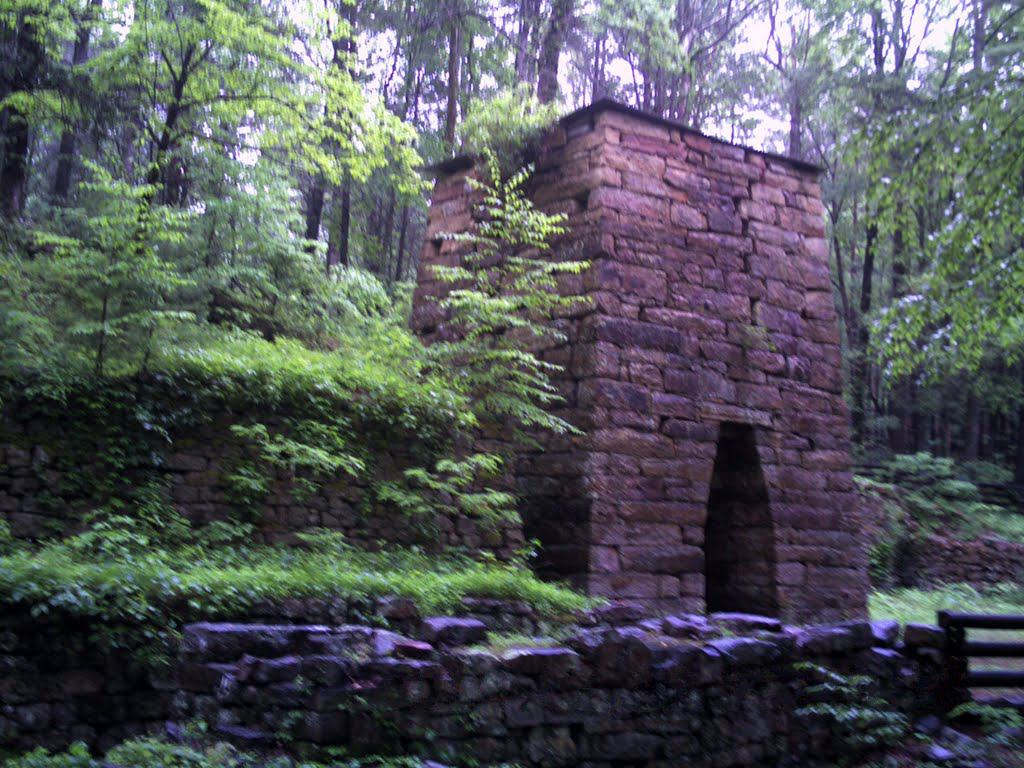
Roaring Run Furnace

The remains of the Roaring Run Furnace are across the creek from the picnic area. In the early 1800s, the furnace was used to fire sandstone and quartzite containing iron ore from the mountain. When heated to 2600 degrees, molten iron flowed from the rock into trenches of sand. The iron then cooled and was formed into ingots to produce iron products such as stoves and skillets. Colorful marble-sized stones, a product of the slag formed during the heating of the rock, similar to the volcanic glass obsidian, can be found on the grounds about the furnace.

== Forest Service management ==
The Forest Service has conducted a survey of their lands to determine the potential for wilderness designation. Wilderness designation provides a high degree of protection from development. The areas that were found suitable are referred to as inventoried roadless areas. Later a Roadless Rule was adopted that limited road construction in these areas. The rule provided some degree of protection by reducing the negative environmental impact of road construction and thus promoting the conservation of roadless areas. Hoop Hole was inventoried in the roadless area review, and therefore protected from possible road construction and timber sales.

The Hoop Hole Trail was used as a firebreak in the 50-acre Roaring Run fire in 2010. Since then, the trail has been restored.

The forest service classifies areas under their management by a recreational opportunity setting that informs visitors of the diverse range of opportunities available in the forest. The area is classified as a "Special Area" with unique prescriptions.

== Cultural history ==
In a 1998 survey of five acres, three inventoried collier pits were found dating back to the latter 1800s.

== See also ==
Barbours Creek-Shawvers Run Cluster
