= Rich Hole Wilderness =

Wilderness area in Virginia, United States

- IUCN category Ib (wilderness area)
- Location within Virginia
- Location: Virginia, United States
- Coordinates: 37°52′17″N 79°38′18″W
- Area: 6,450 acres (26.1 km^{2})
- Elevation: 3,400 ft (1,000 m)
- Established: 1988
- Operator: George Washington and Jefferson National Forests
- Website: George Washington and Jefferson National Forests – Rich Hole Wilderness Area

Rich Hole Wilderness is a designated wilderness area in the James River Ranger District of the George Washington and Jefferson National Forests of Virginia in the United States. The wilderness area was established in 1988 and comprises 6,450 acres (26.1 km^{2}). It is administered by the US Forest Service.

== Topography ==
Rich Hole Wilderness is located 16 miles (26 km) west of Lexington, Virginia, just off of Interstate 64. Rich Hole Wilderness ranges in elevation from 1,500 feet (457 m) to 3,500 feet (1,067 m). The wilderness is named after the drainage "holes" in Brushy Mountain. The Rich Hole Wilderness drainages, the North Branch of Simpson Creek and Alum Creek, are tributaries of the Calfpasture River, which feeds into the James River and the Chesapeake Bay.

== History ==
The Virginia Wilderness Act of 1984 (P.L. 98-586) designated four study areas including the Rich Hole Wilderness, and directed a two-year study by EPA and the State of Virginia on the effects of a proposed development on air quality of the four areas. Under the Clean Air Act, newly designated wilderness areas are only automatically reclassified as PSD Class I if they expand existing mandatory Class I areas. The members of the Virginia congressional delegation were apparently satisfied with the conclusions, and subsequently designated these areas (along with two other areas) as wilderness in 1988 (P.L. 100-326).

The Forest Service in 2009 was working on a revision to its Forest Plan for the George Washington National Forest that proposed adding wilderness acreage to the Rich Hole Wilderness western boundary. The Forest Service stated that "[t]he Rich Hole Addition offers the opportunity to expand the acreage of a small existing Wilderness and almost connect the Rich Hole Wilderness to the Rough Mountain Wilderness."

== Vegetation ==
Rich Hole Wilderness supports old growth white ash and northern red oak along a stream within its boundaries.

A portion of Rich Hole Wilderness is one of ten sites in Virginia designated by the National Park Service as a National Natural Landmark (NNL). A 1,326-acre (5.37 km^{2}) parcel within Rockbridge County was dedicated as an NNL in 1974, and is described by the National Park Service as "An outstanding example of a 'cove' hardwood forest. A well-protected watershed containing a virgin forest with remarkably large trees of several species."

== Wildlife ==
In 1958, an inspection team from the Wilderness Society recommended the suitability of Rich Hole as a wild area based almost exclusively on its large bear population.

Common wildlife found in Rich Hole Wilderness include white-tailed deer, black bear, wild turkey, squirrel, grouse, raccoon, beaver and rabbit, among others.

== Recreation ==
A guide to Virginia wilderness areas describes hunting as "by far the most popular activity" in Rich Hole Wilderness. Although trailheads are very close to Interstate 64, hiking is mostly limited to day hikes. There are no loop trails in the wilderness, so hikes on established trails require a vehicle shuttle or an out-and-back hike. The only maintained trail through the center of the wilderness is the Rich Hole Trail. From its northern trailhead, the trail ascends very steeply to the top of the mountain, then descends gradually to the southern trailhead for a 5.5-mile (8.9 km) total length. Because of multiple stream crossings on the southern portion of the trail, use during the spring can be difficult. A second trail, the White Rock Tower Trail, forms the southern boundary of the wilderness area. This trail uses the roadbed of an old road that went up to the site of a former fire tower at the top of Mill Mountain.

== See also ==
- List of National Natural Landmarks in Virginia
- List of U.S. Wilderness Areas
- Wilderness Act
