= Priest Wilderness =

Wilderness area in Virginia, United States

- IUCN category Ib (wilderness area)
- Location within Virginia
- Location: Nelson, Virginia, United States
- Coordinates: 37°49′04″N 79°04′13″W
- Area: 5,726 acres (23.17 km^{2})
- Elevation: 3,400 ft (1,000 m)
- Established: 2000
- Operator: George Washington and Jefferson National Forests
- Website: George Washington and Jefferson National Forests – Priest Wilderness Area

The Priest Wilderness is a U.S. Wilderness Area in the Glenwood/Pedlar Ranger District of the George Washington and Jefferson National Forests. The wilderness area is located just south of the Tye River, the Three Ridges Wilderness, and Virginia State Route 56. The wilderness consists of 5,726 acres (23.17 km^{2}) and ranges in elevation from 1,000 feet (305 m) at the Tye River to 4,063 feet (1,238 m) at the summit of The Priest.

== Recreation ==
The Appalachian Trail is the only major trail within the boundaries of this wilderness area. The AT here is maintained by the Natural Bridge Appalachian Trail Club, a trail maintenance club affiliated with the Appalachian Trail Conservancy. The AT southbound from Virginia State Route 56 to the summit of the Priest Mountain offers a 3,100 foot elevation gain over 4.3 miles. There is one Appalachian Trail shelter within the wilderness, the Priest Shelter, near the summit of The Priest.

== See also ==
- List of U.S. Wilderness Areas
- Wilderness Act
