= Roaring Run Furnace =

Historic furnace in Virginia, US

- U.S. National Register of Historic Places
- Virginia Landmarks Register
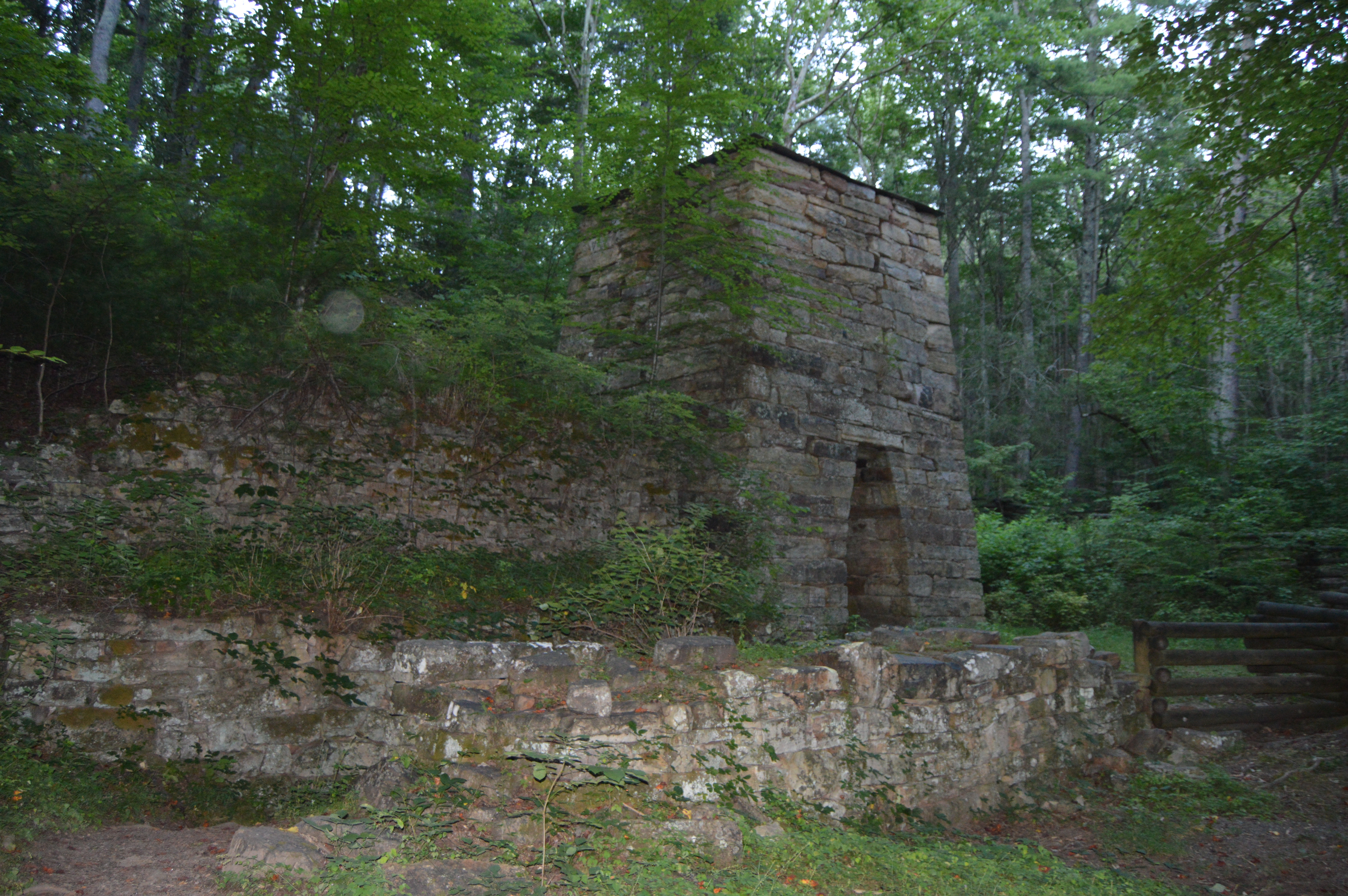
- Overview from the southwest

- Location within Virginia Location within the United States
- Location: NW of Eagle Rock on VA 621 (450 Roaring Run Road), Eagle Rock, Virginia
- Coordinates: 37°42′28″N 79°53′36″W
- Area: less than one acre
- Built: c. 1832
- NRHP reference No.: 83003263
- VLR No.: 011-0063

Significant dates
- Added to NRHP: March 21, 1983
- Designated VLR: June 15, 1976

Roaring Run Furnace is a historic fiery furnace located in Jefferson National Forest near Eagle Rock, Botetourt County, Virginia. It was built about 1832, and reflects the national and statewide economics of the iron industry during the 19th century.

It was listed on the National Register of Historic Places in 1983.

The furnace is on the northeastern corner of the Hoop hole wild area.
