= Huffman House (Newport, Virginia) =

Historic house in Virginia, United States

Coordinates: 37.347251°N 80.401902°W

- U.S. National Register of Historic Places
- Virginia Landmarks Register
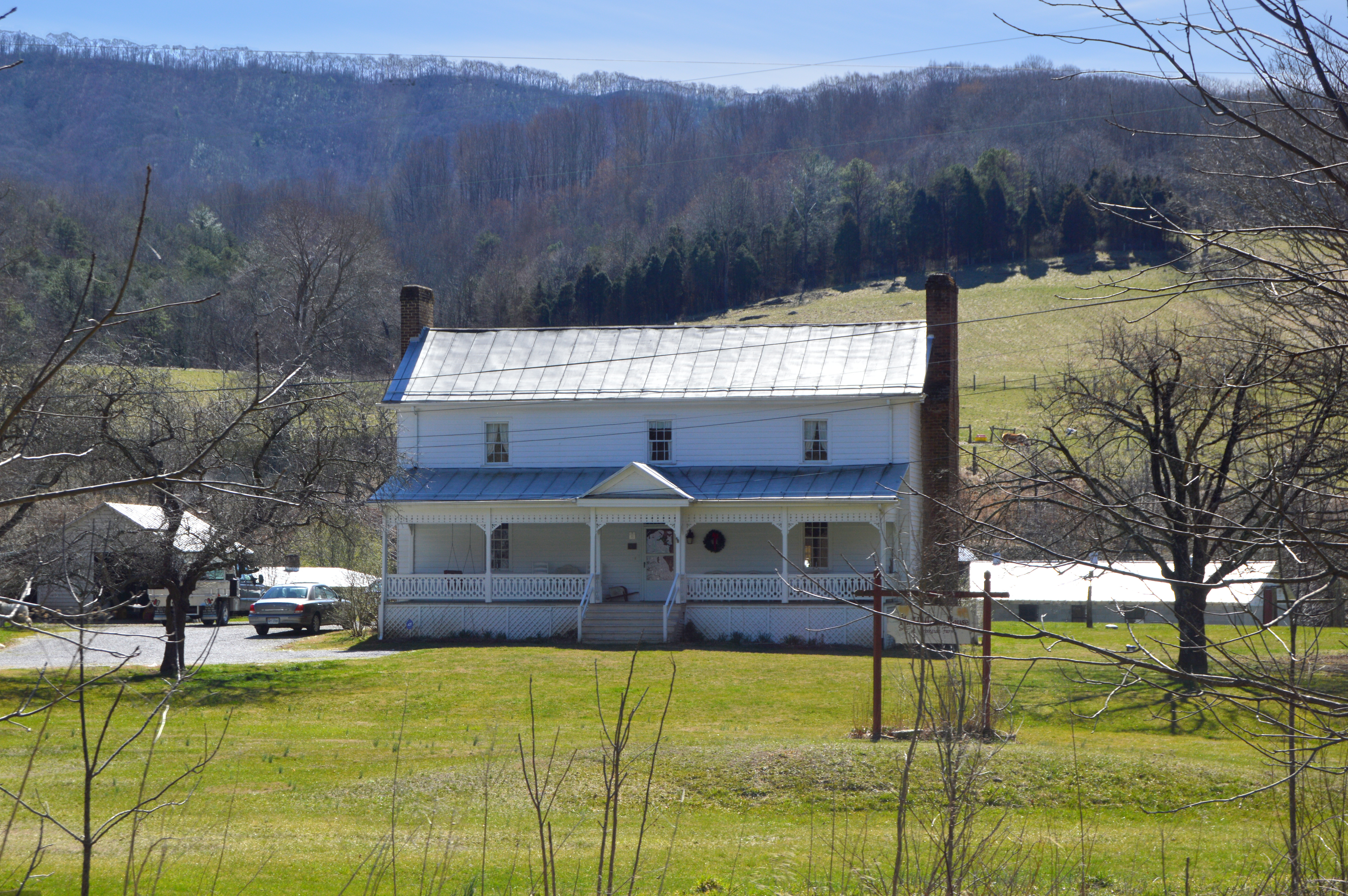
- Front of the house

- Location within Virginia Location within the United States
- Location: State Route 42, Newport, Virginia
- Area: 61.7 acres (25.0 ha)
- Built: c. 1835
- NRHP reference No.: 04001546
- VLR No.: 022-5003

Significant dates
- Added to NRHP: May 26, 2005
- Designated VLR: December 1, 2004

Huffman House, also known as Creekside Farm and Huffman Farm, is a historic home and farm located east of Newport in Craig County, Virginia. The farmhouse was built about 1835, with an addition and remodeling between 1907 and 1911. It is a two-story, single-pile center-hall plan, frame dwelling with a side gable roof. Also on the property are a contributing early-19th century barn, a corn crib, a wash house, a garage, and an early-20th century country store. The property is an example of a small town center located along the Cumberland Gap Turnpike; a major transportation route of the 18th, 19th, and 20th centuries. The country store also held the local post office for a few years, provided sleeping quarters to travelers along the turnpike, and has served as a local Baptismal hole. The farmhouse also doubled as a lodge to weary travelers.

It was listed on the National Register of Historic Places in 2005.
