= Three Ridges Wilderness =

Wilderness area in Virginia, United States

- IUCN category Ib (wilderness area)
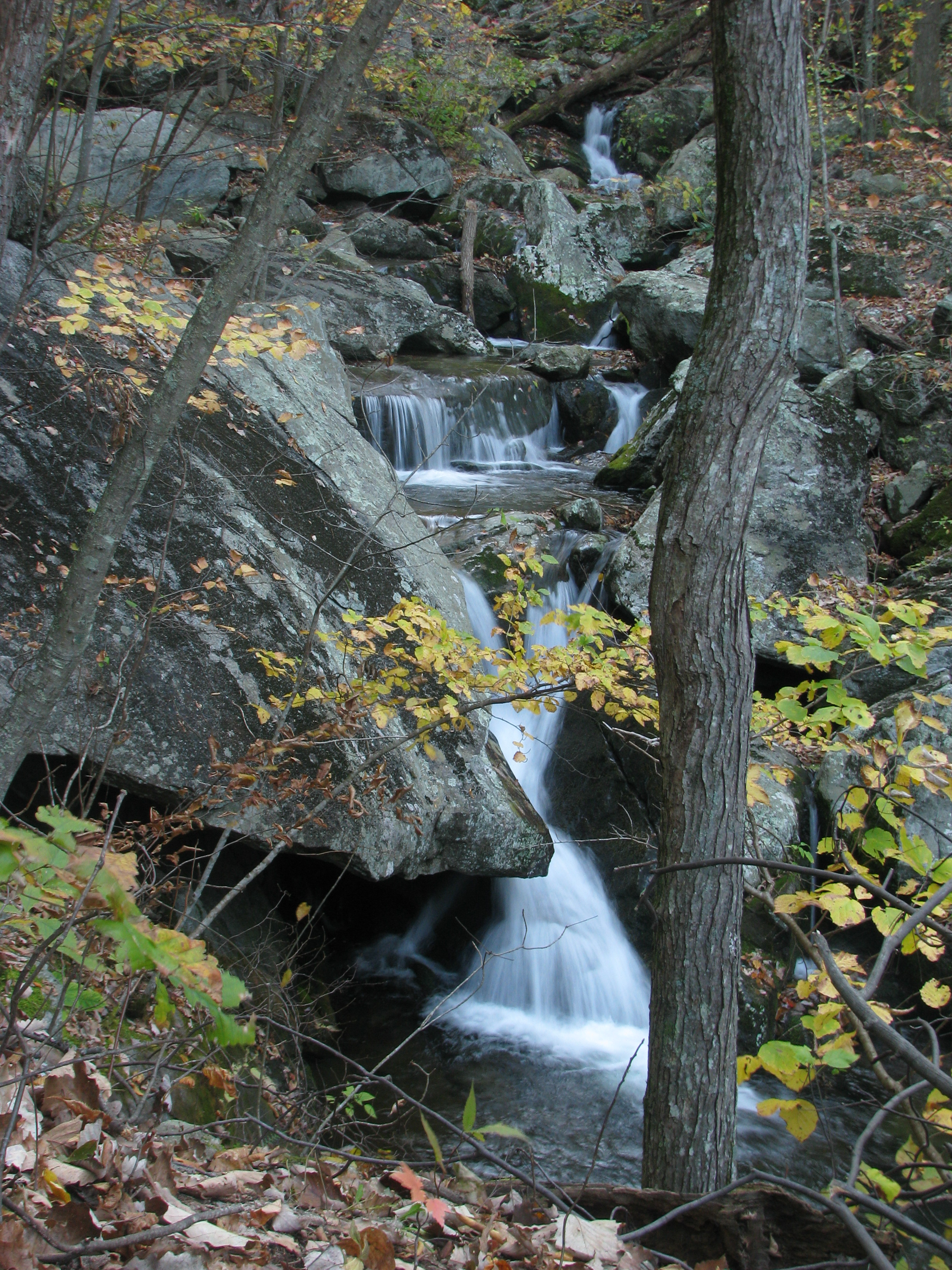

- Location within Virginia
- Location: Nelson, Virginia, United States
- Coordinates: 37°51′52″N 78°59′07″W
- Area: 4,702 acres (19.03 km^{2})
- Elevation: 3,400 ft (1,000 m)
- Established: 2000
- Operator: George Washington and Jefferson National Forests
- Website: George Washington and Jefferson National Forests – Three Ridges Wilderness Area

Three Ridges Wilderness is a U.S. Wilderness Area in the Glenwood/Pedlar Ranger District of the George Washington and Jefferson National Forests. The wilderness area is located just east of the Blue Ridge Parkway between the Tye River and Wintergreen Ski Resort.

It is separated from the boundary of the Priest Wilderness by Virginia State Route 56. The wilderness consists of 4,702 acres (19.03 km^{2}) and ranges in elevation from 1,000 feet (305 m) at the Tye River to 3,970 feet (1,210 m) at the summit of Three Ridges Mountain.

== Recreation ==
The Appalachian Trail crosses through the wilderness for approximately ten miles. This section of the Appalachian Trail, combined with the other trail in the wilderness, the three mile long Mau-Har Trail, creates "one of the best loop trails in the state of Virginia", according to one guidebook. These trails are maintained by the Tidewater Appalachian Trail Club, a trail maintenance club affiliated with the Appalachian Trail Conservancy. There are two Appalachian Trail shelters within the wilderness, the Maupin Field Shelter to the north, and the Harper's Creek Shelter, 2.6 trail miles from the Tye River.

== See also ==
- List of U.S. Wilderness Areas
- Wilderness Act
