= Ramsey's Draft Wilderness =

Land reserve area in Virginia, US

- IUCN category Ib (wilderness area)
- Location within Virginia
- Location: Augusta, Virginia, United States
- Coordinates: 38°20′00″N 79°20′42″W
- Area: 6,518 acres (26.38 km^{2})
- Elevation: 3,400 ft (1,000 m)
- Established: 1984
- Operator: George Washington and Jefferson National Forests
- Website: George Washington and Jefferson National Forests – Ramsey’s Draft Wilderness Area

Ramsey's Draft Wilderness is a designated wilderness area in the North River Ranger District of the George Washington and Jefferson National Forests of Virginia in the United States. The wilderness area was established in 1984 and comprises 6,518 acres (26.38 km^{2}). It is administered by the US Forest Service.

== Topography ==
Ramsey's Draft Wilderness is located between the crests of Shenandoah Mountain and Bald Ridge, north of U.S. Route 250 and approximately 20 miles (32 km) west of Staunton, Virginia. A rugged and steep piece of land, Ramsey's Draft Wilderness ranges in elevation from 1,600 feet (488 m) to 4,282 feet (1,305 m) at Hardscrabble Knob. The wilderness is named after its primary drainage stream. A "draft", is a local term for a creek. Ramsey's Draft is a tributary of the Calfpasture River, which feeds into the James River and the Chesapeake Bay.

== History ==
The US Forest Service first purchased land in this area in 1913 for Shenandoah National Forest, the precursor to the present day George Washington National Forest. The Forest Service has managed the Ramsey's Draft area essentially as a wilderness since 1935 as much of it had never been logged. A road more than three miles (5 km) upstream from U.S. 250 constructed by the Civilian Conservation Corps in the 1930s lasted until 1969, when rainwater from Hurricane Camille wiped out much of the road at the stream crossings. Another flood in November 1985 further eliminated the original road and changed the course of the stream in multiple areas, shortly after the area was officially designated a wilderness under the Virginia Wilderness Act of 1984.

The boundaries of Ramsey's Draft wilderness have long been the subject of discussion. The original wilderness proposal, developed in the early 1970s and backed by the Virginia Wilderness Committee and the Potomac Chapter of the Sierra Club, included most of Shenandoah Mountain between Rt. 250 and FDR 95, the western slope down to private land along Shaws Fork, and much of the Bald Ridge area. The U.S. Forest Service recommended the core ~6,500 acres, and this is the tract that became law.

Since the 1984 Virginia Wilderness Act, several citizen proposals have been developed to expand the boundaries of the Ramsey's Draft Wilderness. None of these have been enacted.

Since 2007, the Forest Service has been working on a revision to its Management Plan for the George Washington National Forest. The draft Plan proposes adding wilderness acreage to the present Ramsey's Draft Wilderness eastern and northern boundaries. The Forest Service notes that a major concern about the Ramsey's Draft addition is the opposition of the county board of supervisors.

In 2004, Virginia Wilderness Committee and local mountain biking groups formed the Friends of Shenandoah Mountain to advocate for expansion of the Ramsey's Draft Wilderness to the north and east, and for a separate wilderness on the western slope of Shenandoah Mountain. This new proposal also includes a large National Scenic Area and additional wilderness areas to the north of Ramsey's Draft. A component of this proposal is an adjustment of the present western boundary of Ramsey's Draft Wilderness to remove the Shenandoah Mountain Trail from the wilderness area to accommodate mountain biking interests. The Friends proposal is supported by a large number of businesses, organizations, and faith groups.

== Vegetation ==
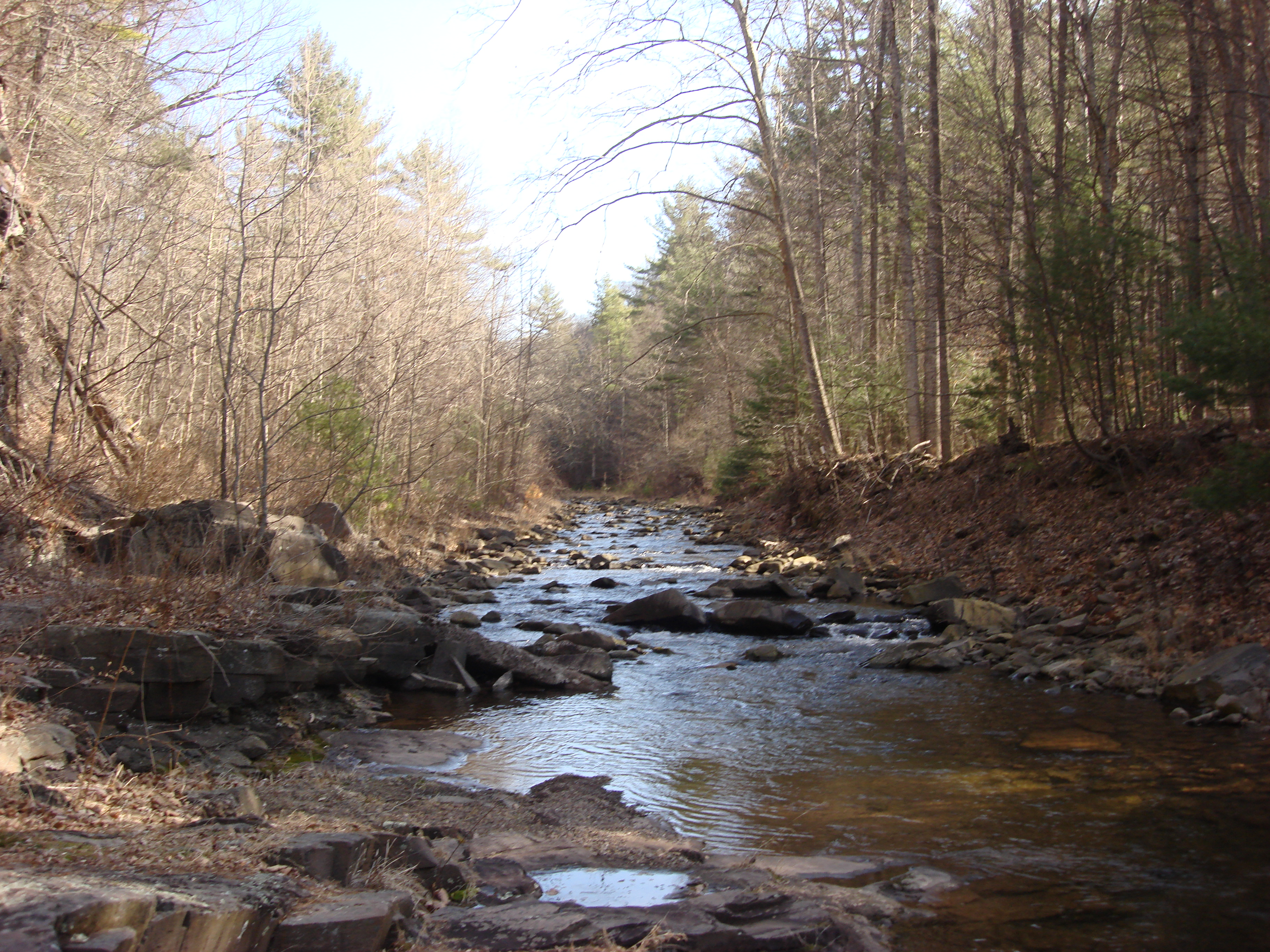
Ramsey's Draft looking north from near the wilderness's southern border, along the Ramsey's Draft Trail.

Ramsey's Draft Wilderness is well known for its stands of old-growth Canadian hemlock, particularly in the northern reaches of Ramsey's Draft, however these stands are under attack by the hemlock woolly adelgid and may not last much longer. Other large trees in the wilderness include tulip poplar, eastern white pine, sugar maple, black birch, shagbark hickory, and northern red oak. Over 250 species of vascular plants have been identified and logged in Ramsey's Draft Wilderness.

== Wildlife ==
Ramsey's Draft is one of the stops on the Virginia Birding and Wildlife Trail established by the Virginia Department of Game and Inland Fisheries. In its description of Ramsey's Draft on the Birding and Wildlife Trail website, the Department of Game and Inland Fisheries explains that this site "is probably popular among birders because it provides nesting grounds for neotropical migrants that typically nest at high elevations".

Ramsey's Draft itself is a native brook trout stream. Other common wildlife found in Ramsey's Draft Wilderness include white-tailed deer, black bear, wild turkey, squirrel, grouse, raccoon, beaver and rabbit, among others.

== Recreation ==
The property has been used for recreation for many years. The Potomac Appalachian Trail Club constructed the Sexton Cabin within the present wilderness boundaries in 1938 Destroyed by fire in 1967, it was rebuilt. Shortly after Ramsey's Draft Wilderness was enacted as law, the Forest Service, interpreting the Wilderness Act to preclude any structures in federal wilderness areas, had the cabin removed. (PATC disputed that decision, and in later years it was determined that existing structures in wilderness areas could stay.) All that remains today is the chimney of Sexton Cabin, along the present-day Jerry's Run Trail. Logs from the Sexton Cabin were later used to construct the PATC's Mutton Top Cabin.

The major trail through the center of the wilderness is the Ramsey's Draft Trail. Rebuilt after the 1985 flood, this trail follows the streambed and the old road (where possible), and has been described as "one of the most popular on Virginia roadless lands" in one guidebook.

Other trails in and around Ramsey's Draft Wilderness include:

- Jerry's Run Trail
- Shenandoah Mountain Trail
- Road Hollow Trail
- Bridge Hollow Trail
- Bald Ridge Trail
- Wild Oak Trail
- Sinclair Hollow Trail
- Hiner Spring Trail

The Shenandoah Mountain Trail is a segment of the Great Eastern Trail project.

== See also ==
- List of U.S. Wilderness Areas
- Wilderness Act
