= George Washington and Jefferson National Forests =

Pair of National Forests in the United States

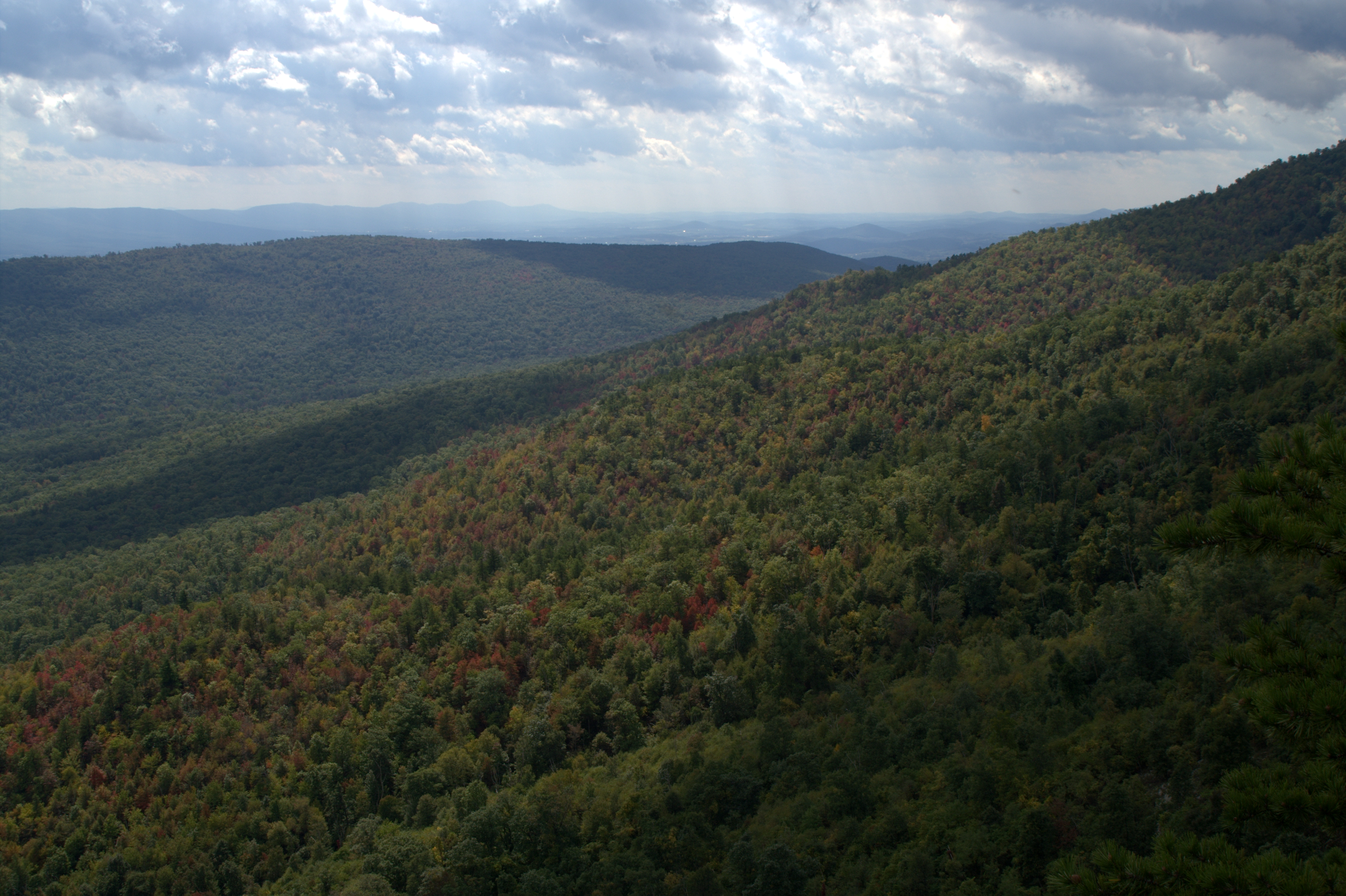
- White Rocks on Little Sluice Mountain in George Washington National Forest.

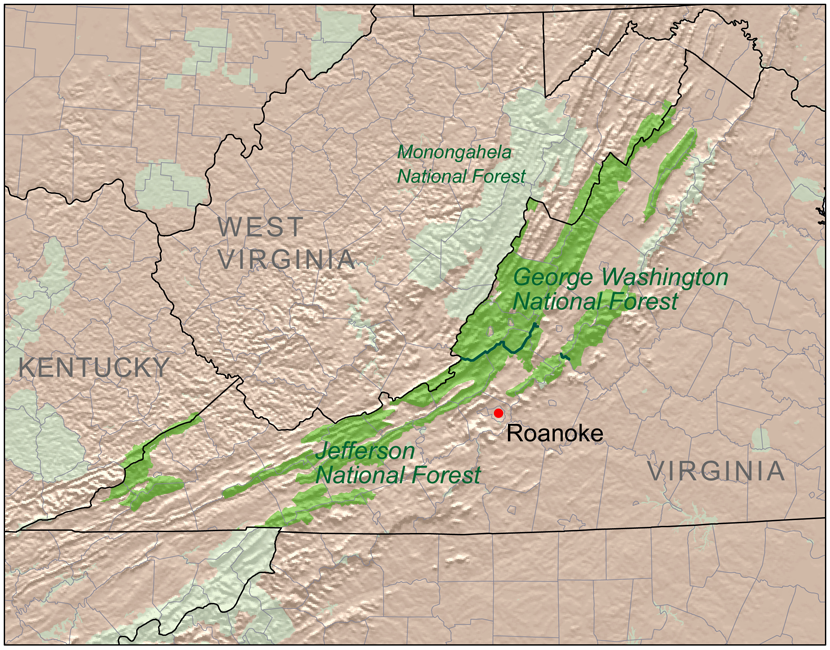
- Location of George Washington and Jefferson National Forests
- Location: United States
- Coordinates: 38°30′0″N 79°0′0″W
- Area: 1,790,933 acres (7,247.65 km^{2})
- Established: 1995
- Website: George Washington and Jefferson National Forests

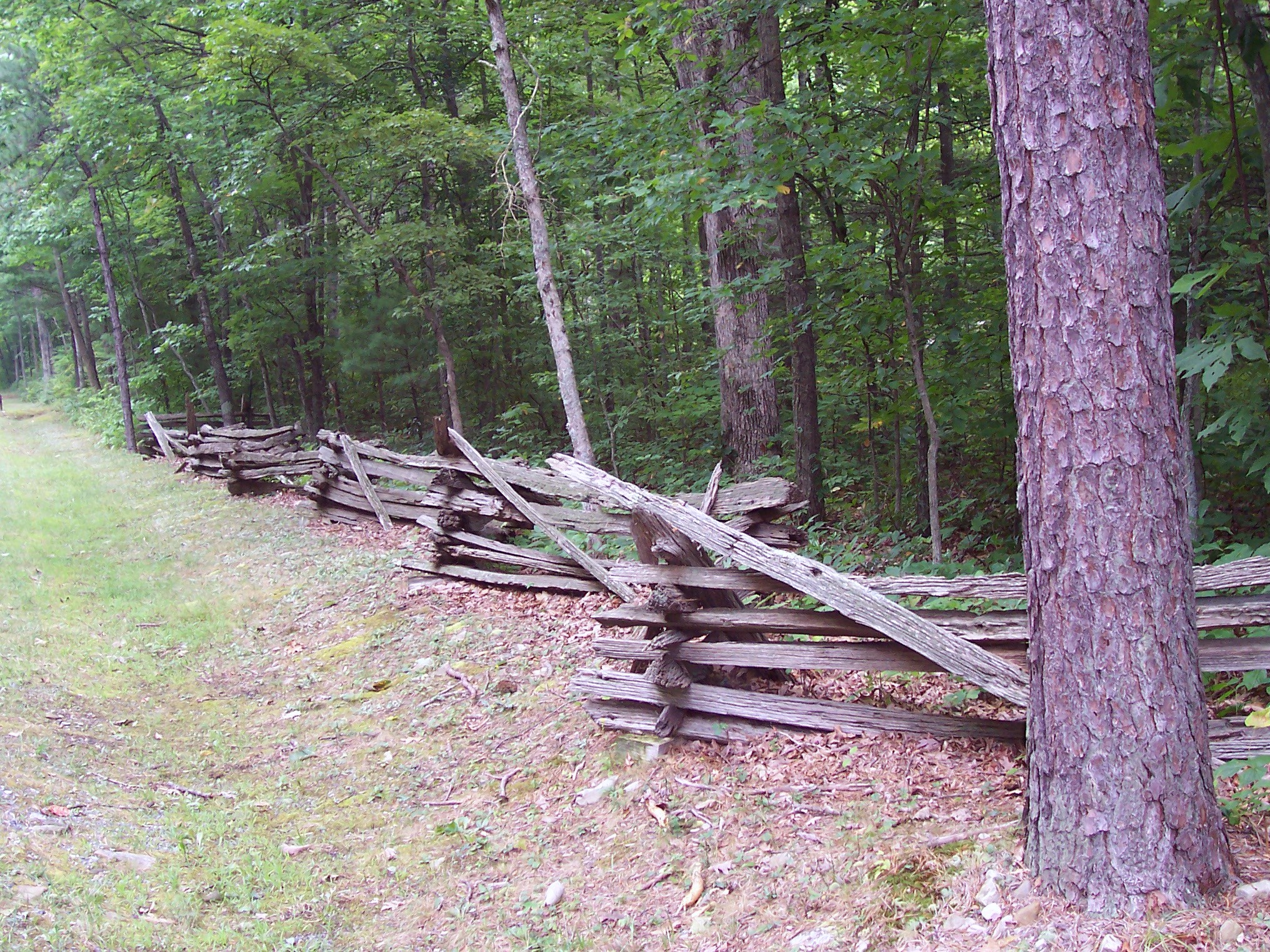
A split rail fence at the entrance to Sherando Lake

The George Washington and Jefferson National Forests is an administrative entity combining two U.S. National Forests into one of the largest areas of public land in the Eastern United States. The forests cover 1.8 million acres (2,800 sq mi; 730,000 ha) of land in the Appalachian Mountains of Virginia, West Virginia, and Kentucky. Approximately 1 million acres (1,600 sq mi; 400,000 ha) of the forest are remote and undeveloped and 139,461 acres (218 sq mi; 56,438 ha) have been designated as wilderness areas, which prohibits future development.

== History ==
George Washington National Forest was established on May 16, 1918, as the Shenandoah National Forest. The forest was renamed after the first President on June 28, 1932. Natural Bridge National Forest was added on July 22, 1933.

Jefferson National Forest was formed on April 21, 1936, by combining portions of the Unaka and George Washington National Forests with other land. In 1995, the George Washington and Jefferson National Forests were administratively combined. The border between the two forests roughly follows the James River. The combined forest is administered from its headquarters in Roanoke, Virginia.

== Notable features ==
- The northern portion of the Blue Ridge Parkway, which is separately administered by the National Park Service, runs through the Forest.
- Over 2,000 miles (3,000 km) of hiking trails, including segments of the Appalachian Trail, go through the forest.
- Virginia's highest point, Mount Rogers, is located in the Mount Rogers National Recreation Area that is part of the forest. Other notable mountains include Elliott Knob, which has one of the last remaining fire lookout towers in the eastern U.S., and Whitetop Mountain.
- Approximately 230,000 acres (930 km^{2}) of old-growth forests.
- The ghost town of Lignite, Virginia, lies within the forest.
- The deepest gorge east of the Mississippi River, Breaks Interstate Park, is located in the forest.
- Roaring Run Furnace is the only site on the National Register of Historic Places owned by the Jefferson National Forest.

== Flora and fauna ==
The Forests' mountainous terrain supports a variety of plant life, including over 50 species of trees and over 2,000 species of shrubs and herbaceous plants.[1]

The Forests contain some 230,000 acres (930 km^{2}) of old growth forests, representing all of the major forest communities found within them. Locations of old growth include Peters Mountain, Mount Pleasant National Scenic Area, Rich Hole Wilderness, Flannery Ridge, Pick Breeches Ridge, and Laurel Fork Gorge, Pickem Mountain, and Mount Rogers National Recreation Area. The Ramsey's Draft and Kimberling Creek Wildernesses in particular are mostly old-growth.

The black bear is relatively common, enough so that there is a short hunting season to prevent overpopulation. White-tailed deer, bobcat, bald eagles, weasel, otter, and marten are also known to inhabit the Forests.

== Activities ==
The forests are popular hiking, mountain biking, and hunting destinations. The Appalachian Trail extends for 330 miles (530 km) from the southern end of Shenandoah National Park through the forest and along the Blue Ridge Parkway. The forest is within a two-hour drive for over ten million people and thus receives large numbers of visitors, especially in the region closest to Shenandoah National Park.

The George Washington National Forest is a popular destination for trail runners. It is the location for several Ultramarathons, including the Massanutten Mountain Trails 100 miler, the Old Dominion 100 miler, and the Old Dominion Memorial 100 miler.

George Washington Forest is also the venue for Nature Camp, a natural science education-oriented summer camp for youth. The camp is located on national forest land near the town of Vesuvius, Virginia. It has operated at this location since the summer of 1953.

== Counties ==
Jefferson National Forest is located in 23 separate counties, more than any other National Forest except Mark Twain National Forest in Missouri, which lies in 29 counties. Botetourt, Monroe, and Rockbridge counties, at the dividing line between the two forests, include parts of both forests. Thirdly, note that the state of Kentucky actually has very little area, with its two counties bringing up the tail end of Jefferson National Forest.

George Washington National Forest
Jefferson National Forest
Total area of 1,064,176 acres (4,307 km^{2}).
Total area of 726,757 acres (2,941 km^{2}).

County	Area acres	Percentage
Alleghany County, Virginia	140,361	13.19%
Amherst County, Virginia	57,236	5.38%
Augusta County, Virginia	193,011	18.14%
Bath County, Virginia	173,379	16.29%
Botetourt County, Virginia	13,411	1.26%
Frederick County, Virginia	5,054	0.47%
Hampshire County, West Virginia	3,402	0.32%
Hardy County, West Virginia	51,629	4.85%
Highland County, Virginia	59,283	5.57%
Monroe County, West Virginia	576	0.05%
Nelson County, Virginia	20,015	1.88%
Page County, Virginia	27,852	2.62%
Pendleton County, West Virginia	50,757	4.77%
Rockbridge County, Virginia	46,794	4.40%
Rockingham County, Virginia	140,330	13.19%
Shenandoah County, Virginia	75,349	7.08%
Warren County, Virginia	5,737	0.54%

County	Area acres	Percentage
Bedford County, Virginia	20,757	2.86%
Bland County, Virginia	76,556	10.53%
Botetourt County, Virginia	69,038	9.50%
Carroll County, Virginia	7,145	0.98%
Craig County, Virginia	117,336	16.15%
Dickenson County, Virginia	8,836	1.22%
Giles County, Virginia	64,656	8.90%
Grayson County, Virginia	33,339	4.59%
Lee County, Virginia	11,268	1.55%
Letcher County, Kentucky	751	0.10%
Monroe County, West Virginia	19,187	2.64%
Montgomery County, Virginia	19,454	2.68%
Pike County, Kentucky	127	0.02%
Pulaski County, Virginia	19,239	2.65%
Roanoke County, Virginia	3,290	0.45%
Rockbridge County, Virginia	18,426	2.54%
Russell County, Virginia	N/A	N/A
Scott County, Virginia	34,093	4.69%
Smyth County, Virginia	75,259	10.36%
Tazewell County, Virginia	10,340	1.42%
Washington County, Virginia	22,514	3.10%
Wise County, Virginia	36,732	5.05%
Wythe County, Virginia	58,414	8.04%

== Ranger district offices ==
Ranger offices are the Forest Service's public service offices. Maps and other information about the forests can be obtained at these locations. These offices are open Monday through Friday from 8:00 a.m. to 4:30 p.m. The Supervisor's Office in Roanoke is not located in the forest and is primarily an administrative location.

District offices are listed from north to south. Counties are in Virginia unless otherwise indicated.

District	Office Location	Counties served
Lee Ranger District	Edinburg, Virginia	Frederick, Hampshire (WV), Hardy (WV), Page, Rockingham, Shenandoah, Warren
North River Ranger District	Harrisonburg, Virginia	Augusta, Highland, Pendleton (WV), Rockingham
Warm Springs Ranger District	Hot Springs, Virginia	Bath, Highland
James River Ranger District	Covington, Virginia	Alleghany
Glenwood-Pedlar Ranger District	Natural Bridge Station, Virginia	Amherst, Augusta, Bedford, Botetourt, Nelson, and Rockbridge
Eastern Divide Ranger District	Blacksburg, Virginia	Bland, Botetourt, Craig, Giles, Monroe (WV), Montgomery, Pulaski, Roanoke, Smyth, Tazewell, Wythe
Clinch Ranger District	Norton, Virginia	Dickenson, Lee, Letcher (KY), Pike (KY), Scott, Wise
Mount Rogers National Recreation Area	Marion, Virginia	Carroll, Grayson, Smyth, Washington, Wythe

== Wilderness areas ==
There are 139,461 acres (564 km^{2}) of federally designated wilderness areas in the two forests under the United States National Wilderness Preservation System. All are in the state of Virginia, except as indicated. The largest of these is the Mountain Lake Wilderness, at 16,511 acres (67 km^{2}). There are 17 wildernesses in Jefferson National Forest, second only to Tongass National Forest, which has 19.

=== George Washington National Forest ===
- Barbours Creek Wilderness (part)
- Priest Wilderness
- Ramseys Draft Wilderness
- Rich Hole Wilderness
- Rough Mountain Wilderness
- Saint Mary's Wilderness
- Shawvers Run Wilderness (part)
- Three Ridges Wilderness

=== Jefferson National Forest ===
- Barbours Creek Wilderness (most)
- Beartown Wilderness
- Brush Mountain East Wilderness
- Brush Mountain Wilderness
- Garden Mountain Wilderness
- Hunting Camp Creek Wilderness
- James River Face Wilderness
- Kimberling Creek Wilderness
- Lewis Fork Wilderness
- Little Dry Run Wilderness
- Little Wilson Creek Wilderness
- Mountain Lake Wilderness (Virginia / West Virginia)
- Peters Mountain Wilderness
- Raccoon Branch Wilderness
- Shawvers Run Wilderness (most)
- Stone Mountain Wilderness
- Thunder Ridge Wilderness

== Wilderness Society's "Mountain Treasures" in the Jefferson Forest ==
In 1999 the Wilderness Society conducted a review of lands in the Jefferson National Forest to look for large, intact areas that satisfy a need for backcountry recreation, ecological study, biodiversity, and the preservation of cultural history from early America. The report found 67 such areas and identified them as "Mountain Treasures". In 2012 The New River Group of the Sierra Club commissioned a study to review the status of these areas. Some of the areas had been converted into Wilderness Areas, while others had not received any special protection. Areas in close proximity were grouped with nearby wilderness areas into eleven clusters. The clusters, from north to south, are:

- Glenwood Cluster
- Craig Creek Cluster
- Barbours Creek-Shawvers Run Cluster
- Sinking Creek Valley Cluster
- Mountain Lake Wilderness Cluster
- Angels Rest Cluster
- Walker Mountain Cluster
- Kimberling Creek Cluster
- Garden Mountain Cluster
- Mount Rogers Cluster
- Clinch Ranger District Cluster

== History ==
The first camp of the Civilian Conservation Corps NF-1, Camp Roosevelt, was established in the George Washington National Forest near Luray, Virginia. It is now the site of the Camp Roosevelt Recreation Area.

=== Mountain Valley Pipeline protests ===
In 2018–2019, protests occurred near Peters Mountain to block the Mountain Valley Pipeline. The 303-mile pipeline would transport natural gas through the Jefferson National Forest and cross the Appalachian Trail.

=== 2023 crash ===
In 2023 a small plane carrying four people strayed into restricted Washington, D.C., airspace. Because of this, a number of F16 jets were sent to intercept the aircraft. The pilots of the jets noticed that the aircraft pilot was passed out. The plane eventually crashed landed in the park. There were no survivors.

== See also ==
- Great North Mountain
- List of national forests of the United States
- Massanutten Mountain
- Monongahela National Forest—Adjoining forest in West Virginia
- Shenandoah Mountain
