= Barbours Creek-Shawvers Run Cluster =

Protected natural area in Virginia, United States

- Location within Virginia
- Location: Allegheny County; Botetourt County; Craig County; Virginia, United States
- Coordinates: 37°36′53″N 80°6′52″W
- Administrator: U.S. Forest Service

The Barbours Creek-Shawvers Run Cluster is a region in the Jefferson National Forest recognized by The Wilderness Society for its unique high elevation mountains, vistas, trout streams and wildlife habitat. With over 25,000 acres in a remote corner of the national forest, the cluster provides protection for black bear, clean water and backcountry hiking.

== Description ==
The Barbours Creek/Shawvers Run Wilderness Cluster contains wilderness areas, and wildlands recognized by the Wilderness Society as "Mountain Treasures", areas that are worthy of protection from logging and road construction.

The areas in the cluster are:

- Wilderness Areas
  - Barbours Creek Wilderness
  - Shawvers Run Wilderness
- Wild areas in the Jefferson National Forest recognized by the Wilderness Society as "Mountain Treasures"
  - Hoop hole
  - Barbours Creek Wilderness Addition
  - Potts Arm
- Toms Knob, a wild area in the George Washington National Forest recognized by the Wilderness Society as a "Mountain Treasure".

== Location and access ==
1983 Map of the north portion of the Jefferson National Forest in southwest Virginia

The cluster is about six miles north of New Castle. Roads and trails are given on National Geographic Maps 788 (Covington, Alleghany Highlands). A great variety of information, including topographic maps, aerial views, satellite data and weather information, is obtained by selecting the link with the wild land's coordinates in the upper right of this page.

== Biological significance ==
The landform, climate, soils and geology of the Appalachian highlands, as well as its evolutionary history, have created one of the most diverse collection of plants and animals in the deciduous forests of the temperate world.

At one time the American chestnut was a dominant part of the forest, but it was almost eliminated during the first three decades of the twentieth century by a chestnut blight fungus. Now the area is dominated by different species of oak.

== Geologic history ==
Extending along the western boundary of Virginia, the Ridge and Valley province is composed of long, relatively level-crested, ridges with highest elevations reaching over 3600 feet. The province marks the eastern boundary in the Paleozoic era of an older land surface on the east. It was uplifted and eroded during the Paleozoic with extensive folding and thrust faulting. Resistant quartzite, conglomerates and sandstones form the ridge caps while less resistant shales and limestones eroded to form the intervening valleys.

The area is part of the James River drainage. Shawvers Run is a tributary of Potts Creek, which flows into the James River. Barbours Creek flows into Craig Creek, a tributary of the James River.

== Toms Knob ==
Toms Knob is a wild area that extends into both the James River District of the George Washington National Forest and the Eastern Divide District of the Jefferson National Forest. A review by the wilderness society of areas in the George Washington National Forest recognized the area as a "Mountain Treasure". Named after a series of rock outcrops on the crest of Potts Mountain, the knob offers good views of the Potts Creek Valley and Peters Mountain on the west. The Potts Mountain Jeep Road, running along the crest of Potts Mountain, separates the area from the Barbours Creek Wilderness. The highest elevation is about 3800 feet on the crest of Potts Mountain; the lowest elevation is 1750 feet in Shanty Hollow on the northeast corner of the area.

The area includes a small Special Biological Area on the crest of the ridge, as well as small areas of potential old-growth trees.

There are a few short trails in the Shanty Hollow area, in the northeastern tip of the area. Trails include:

- Children's Forest, Forest Service Trail 626, 0.3 miles
- Children's Forest Long Loop, FS Trail 627, 2.6 miles
- Children's Forest Horse, FS Trail 628, 3.3 miles

== Black bear ==
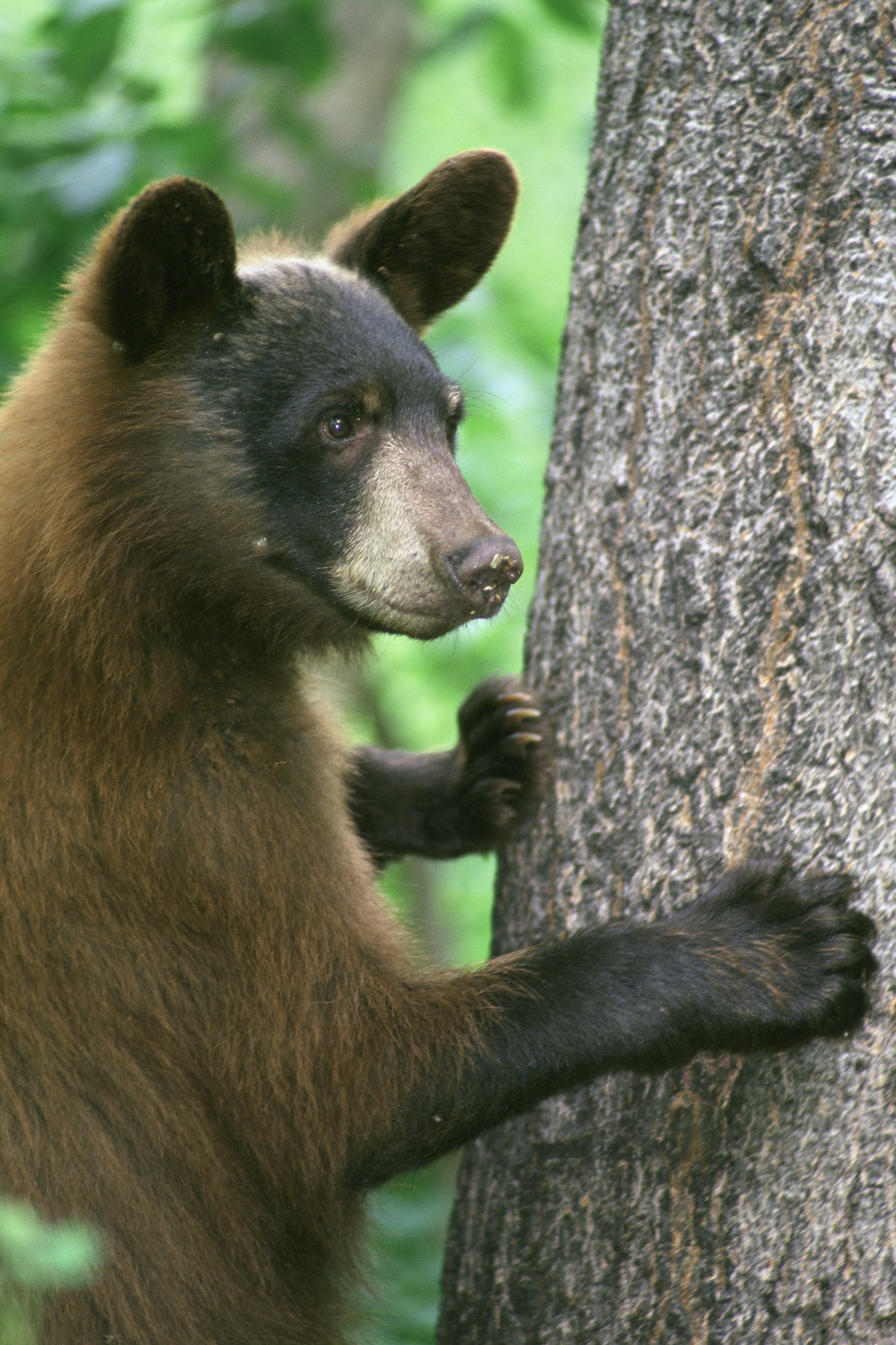
American black bear - FWS

The cluster's large area provides essential habitat for the black bear population, an umbrella species contributing to the biological diversity of the Appalachians.

The area gives bear a refuge from human activities, and the availability of critical food in the form of acorns from oaks, as well as spring and summer foods such as blueberries, blackberries, pokeweed and huckleberries. Bears require space for escape cover and winter dens. Without the forest lands in the Appalachians, the black bear population would be threatened.

== Steel Bridge Recreation Area ==
The recreation area, on Potts Creek, is at the north end of Shawvers Run Wilderness. Visitors on hot summer days can wade in the cold water of Potts Creek or enjoy fishing in pools beneath rock overhangs along the banks of Potts Creek. There are 20 primitive campsites with tables, fireplaces, hand-pumped water and pit toilets. The area is open year-around.

== See also ==
Unprotected Wildlands in the George Washington National Forest

== Other clusters ==
Other clusters of the Wilderness Society's "Mountain Treasures" in the Jefferson National Forest (north to south):

- Glenwood Cluster
- Craig Creek Cluster
- Sinking Creek Valley Cluster
- Mountain Lake Wilderness Cluster
- Angels Rest Cluster
- Walker Mountain Cluster
- Kimberling Creek Cluster
- Garden Mountain Cluster
- Mount Rogers Cluster
- Clinch Ranger District Cluster
