= Greater Newport Rural Historic District =

Historic district in Virginia, United States

- U.S. National Register of Historic Places
- U.S. Historic district
- Virginia Landmarks Register
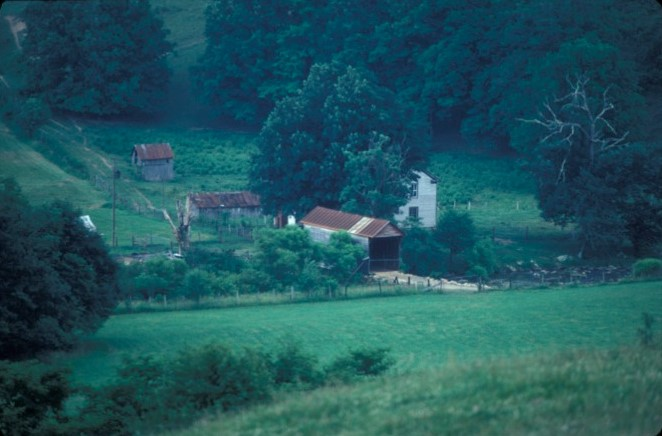

- Location within Virginia Location within the United States
- Location: Roughly bounded by U.S. Route 460 and State Routes 42, 601, 603, 604, 605, and 700, near Newport, Virginia
- Coordinates: 37°18′27″N 80°31′42″W
- Area: 21,371 acres (8,649 ha)
- Built: 1790
- Built by: Moody, William Lewis, Jr.; Heyword E. Henderson
- Architectural style: Greek Revival, Italianate, et al.
- NRHP reference No.: 00000489
- VLR No.: 035-0412

Significant dates
- Added to NRHP: December 14, 2000
- Designated VLR: December 8, 1993

Greater Newport Rural Historic District is a national historic district located near Newport, Giles County, Virginia. It encompasses a total of 737 contributing buildings and 25 contributing structures in the rural area near the village of Newport. It encompasses the previously listed Newport Historic District. The district includes primarily 19th- and early-20th-century farmsteads and complexes. Notable buildings include the "Camper" Cabin (late 18th century), Albert Meredith Cabin (c. 1840), E. L. Lucas House (c. 1850), Moses Atkins House (1837), William Lafon House (1855), Doak Lucas House (1860), Leonard Kessinger House (1871), Martin Farrier House (1905), Steve and Lori Taylor House (1938), Upper Spruce Run School (1890), Clover Hollow Christian Church (1921), Sherry Memorial Church, Old Cook Mill (c. 1910), three standing diminutive Burr covered bridges, a smelting furnace (1871), the Mountain Lake Hotel Resort, and the Biological Station of the University of Virginia (1934).

It was listed on the National Register of Historic Places in 2000.
