= Potts Creek, Virginia =

Unincorporated community in Virginia, United States

Coordinates: 37°37′13″N 80°11′15″W

Potts Creek is an unincorporated community in Alleghany County, Virginia, United States. It is also the name of a watercourse in the same area, Potts Creek. It is located just north of the Craig County line, six miles north of Paint Bank and 18 miles south of Covington. It is located on Virginia State Route 18.
