= Barbours Creek Wilderness =

Wilderness area in Virginia, United States

- IUCN category Ib (wilderness area)
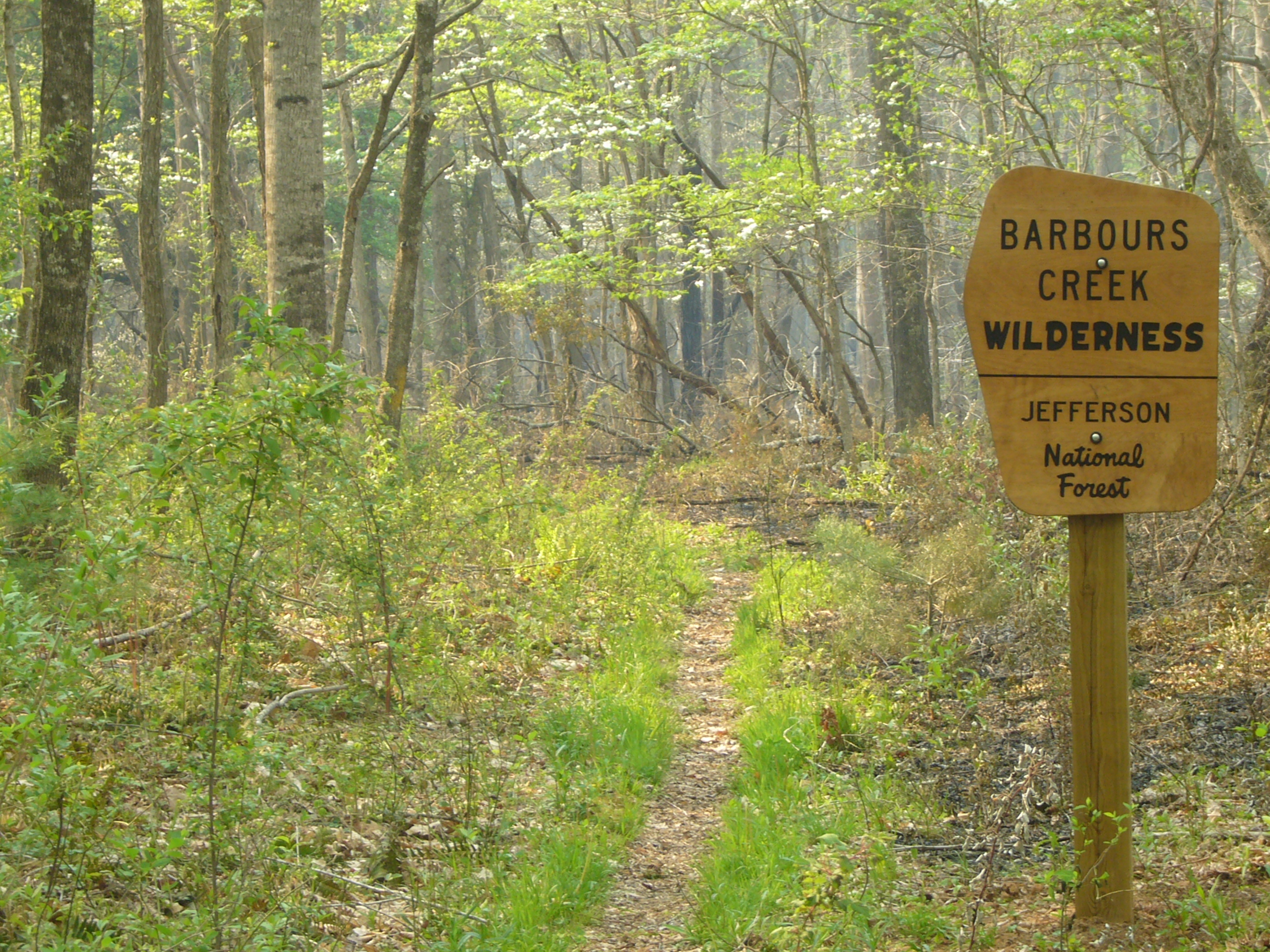

- Location within Virginia Location within the United States
- Location: Craig County, Virginia, United States
- Nearest city: Roanoke, Virginia
- Coordinates: 37.6054681°N 80.1036255°W
- Area: 5,382 acres (2,178 ha)
- Established: June 7, 1988

Barbours Creek Wilderness is a U.S. wilderness area in the Eastern Divide Ranger District of George Washington and Jefferson National Forests of western Virginia, United States. The wilderness area was established in 1988 and consists of 5,382 acres (2,178 ha) of forests in the Appalachian Mountains ranging in elevation from 1,700 to 3,800 feet (520 to 1,160 m).

The area is part of the Barbours Creek-Shawvers Run Cluster.

== Location and access ==
Located about five miles north of New Castle, Virginia, the wilderness is bounded on the west by the crest of Potts Mountain, on the east by Barbour's Creek and Va 617, and on the south by Forest Service Road 176.

The only maintained trail in the area, Lipes Branch Trail, follows along Lipes Branch for 1.7 miles with a trailhead near the Pines Campground. The hike along Lipes Branch Trail can be extended to a total of 2.3 miles by continuing along Lipes Branch beyond the maintained section of Lipes Branch Trail, continuing to the Potts Mountain Jeep Trail, and turning left onto the jeep trail to reach the next knob with a rock outcrop on the right.

Another view of the wilderness is gained by hiking along the Potts Mountain Jeep Trail beginning at trailheads on either FS 176 or Va 617. The 7.3 mile jeep trail is not in the wilderness, but directly next to the wilderness forming the western boundary.

== Natural history ==
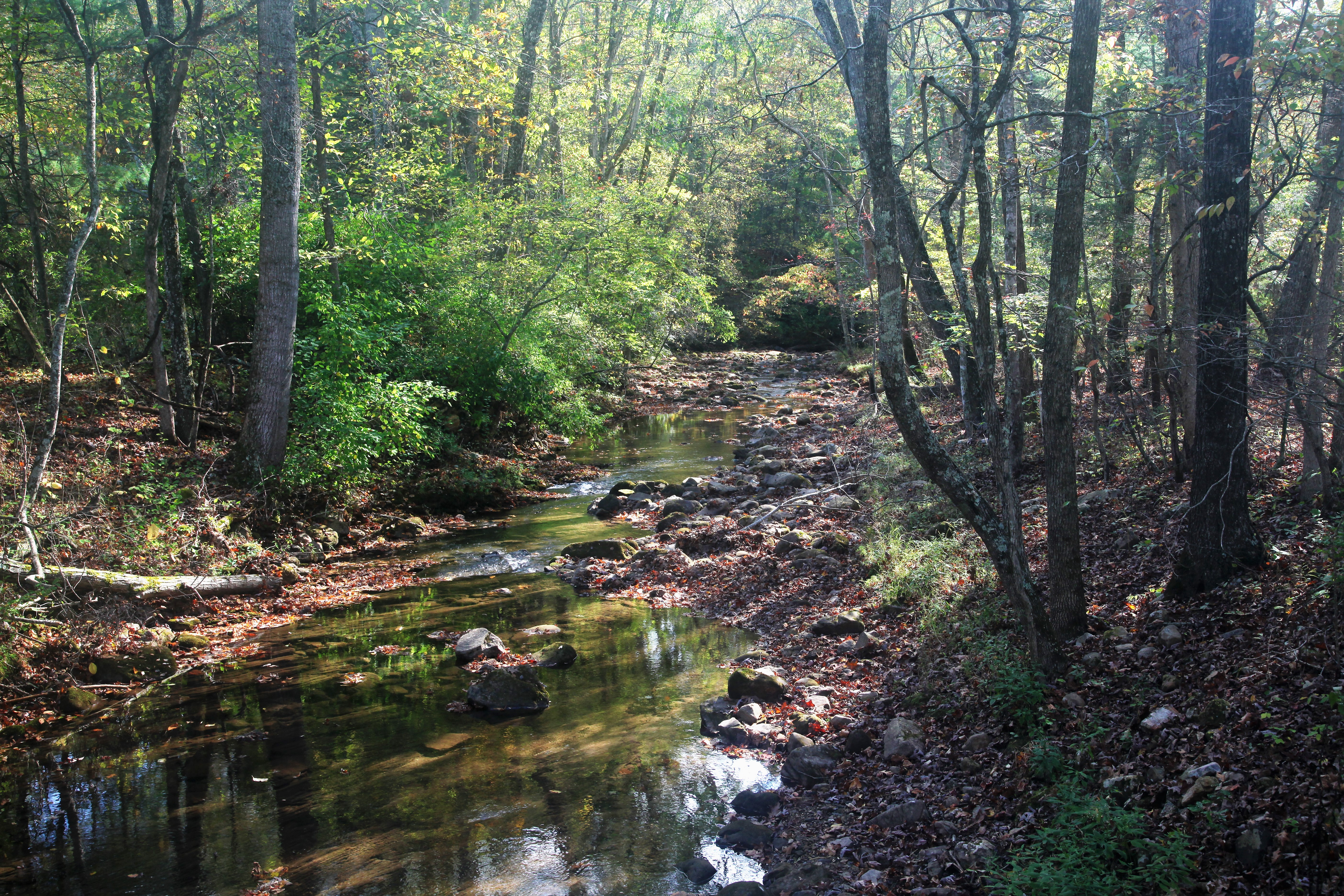
Barbours Creek, near Va 617

There are two major types of forests in the wilderness, a forest with northern red oak, hickory, birch and some mountain ash along the drier slopes at the top of the mountain, and another with white pine, hemlock and white oak in moist areas along Barbours Creek and some mountain hollows.

In April, 2012, a wind-swept fire, originating on the Potts Mountain Jeep Trail, burned a large section of the wilderness, destroying the canopy along the tops of side-ridges and leaving scarred trees still present today.

Potts Pond, a site identified by the Virginia Natural Heritage Program, contains sphagnum moss, ferns, insectivorous plants and other rare plants. The amber-winged spreadwing, a rare damsel fly, is found here, as well as the federally endangered northeastern bulrush.

With the adjacent National Forest, the area is a good habitat for black bears who thrive in the wilderness, for birds with about 160 species of birds having been found, and bobcats, with one of the largest concentrations of bobcats in Virginia.

== Topography ==
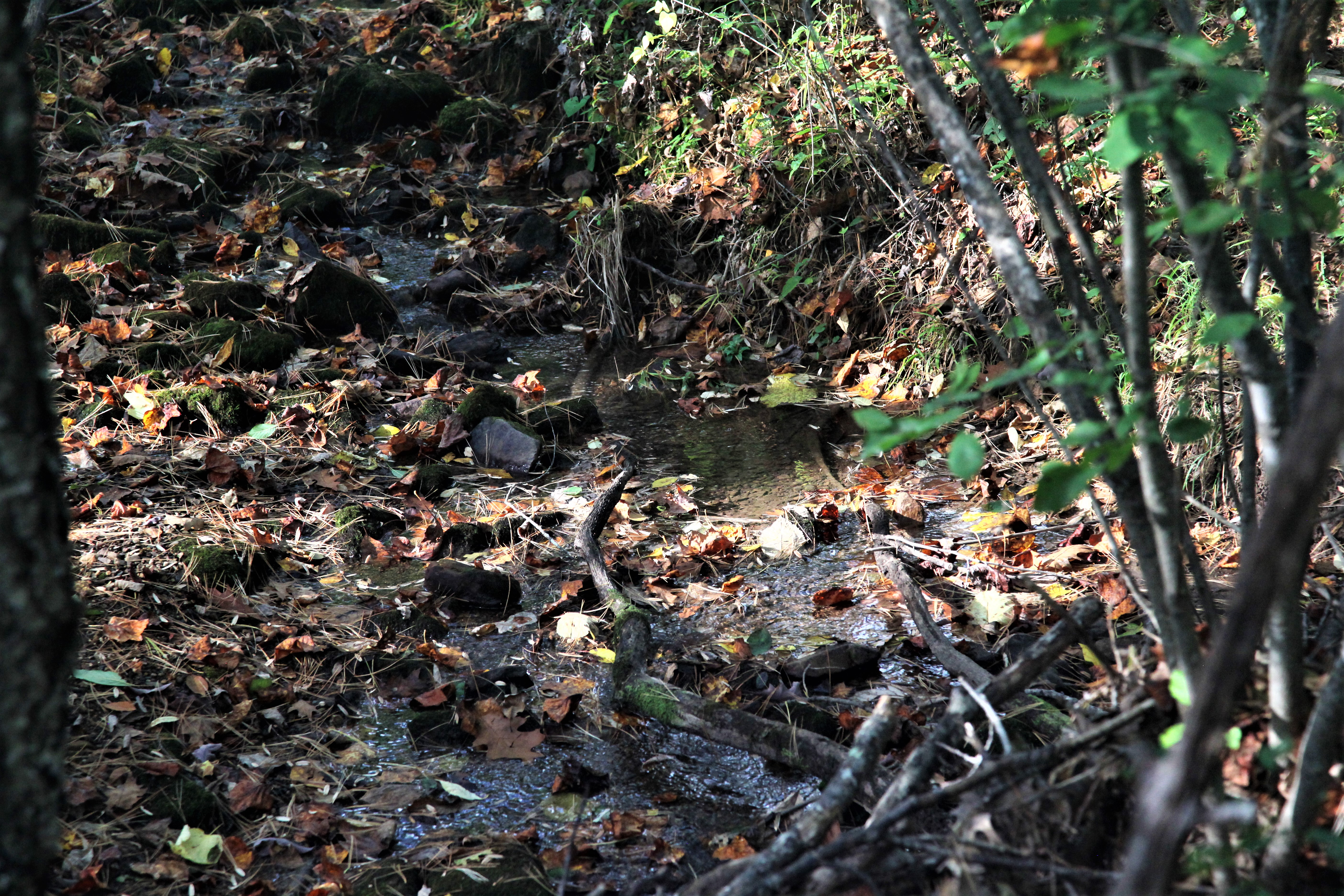
Lipes Branch, at Va 617

Potts Mountain, with a maximum elevation of 3169 feet, is part of the Ridge and Valley System that extends in a northwesterly direction along the border of Virginia and West Virginia.

The wilderness falls on the eastern slope of Potts Mountain, adjacent to the Shawvers Run Wilderness on the western slope. The wilderness area rises from 1700 feet at the lower creeks to 3800 feet on the mountain.

There is a bald of about fifty acres in size, just outside the western boundary, on the top of Potts Mountain with extensive views.

Barbours Creek, for which the wilderness is named, passes the wilderness flowing southeast, and curls around Bald Mountain to join Craig Creek, which then flows into the James River. The creek is designated by the Virginia Department of Game and Inland Fisheries as a cold water stream. Lipes Branch, also a cold water stream, flows down Potts Mountain into Barbours Creek. Another stream to the south flows through a narrow canyon formed by an interesting rock formation.

== See also ==
Barbours Creek-Shawvers Run Cluster
