= Shawver, West Virginia =

- Unincorporated community
- Location within West Virginia Location within the United States
- Coordinates: 37°53′12″N 80°45′56″W
- Country: United States
- State: West Virginia
- Counties: Fayette and Greenbrier
- Elevation: 3,008 ft (917 m)
- Time zone: UTC-5 (Eastern (EST))
  - Summer (DST): UTC-4 (EDT)
- Area codes: 304 & 681
- GNIS feature ID: 1549926

Shawver is an unincorporated community in Fayette and Greenbrier counties, West Virginia, United States. Shawver is 5 miles (8.0 km) northeast of Meadow Bridge.

Shawver most likely is a corruption of Schaeffer.
