= Newport, Giles County, Virginia =

Unincorporated community in Virginia, United States

- Unincorporated community
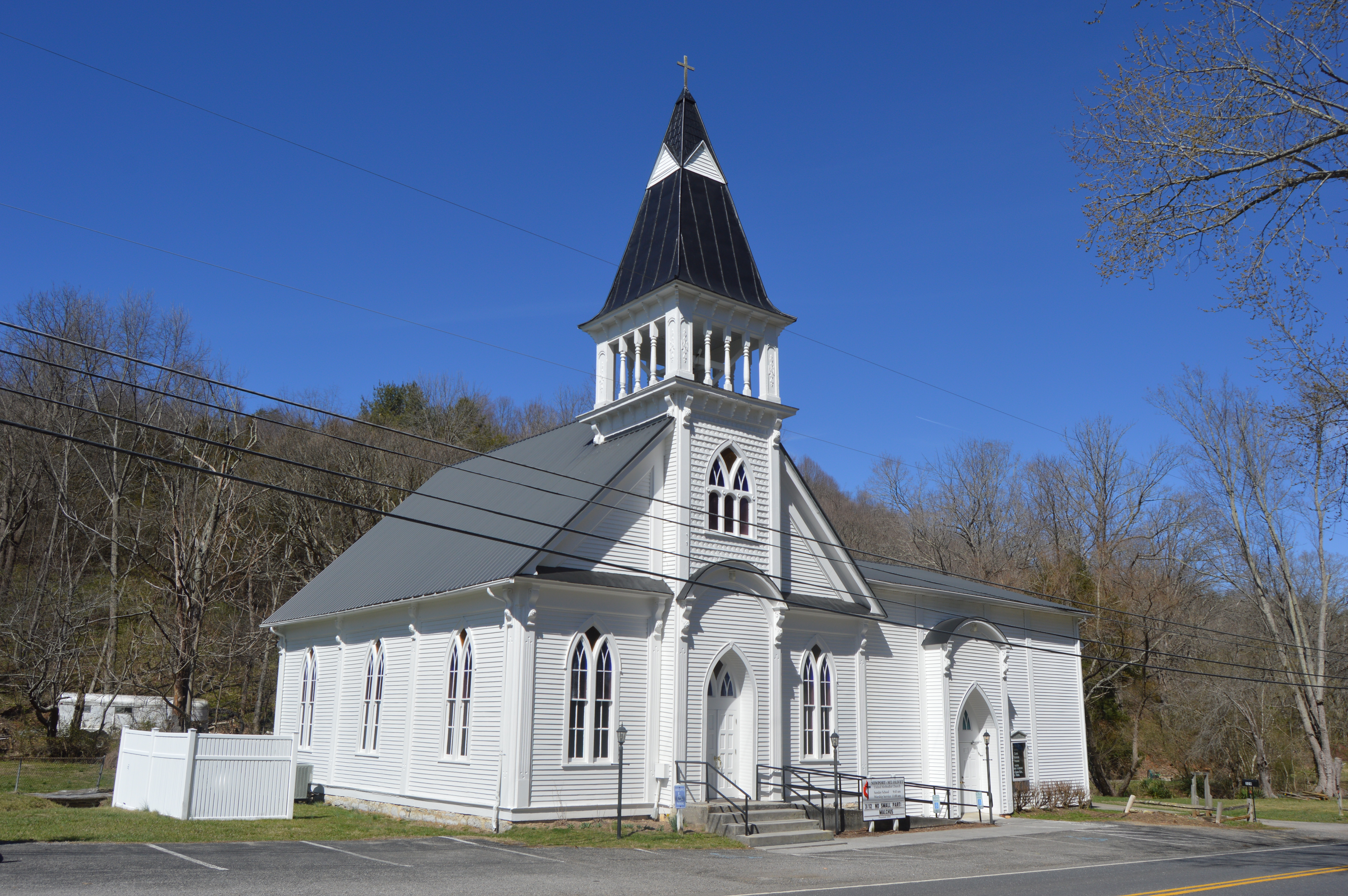
- Mount Olivet United Methodist Church in 2017

- Location within Shenandoah Valley Location within Virginia Location within the United States
- Coordinates: 37°17′39″N 80°29′43″W
- Country: United States
- State: Virginia
- County: Giles
- Elevation: 1,929 ft (588 m)
- Time zone: UTC-5 (Eastern (EST))
  - Summer (DST): UTC-4 (EDT)
- ZIP code: 24128
- Area code: 540
- GNIS feature ID: 1497042

Newport is an unincorporated community in Giles County, Virginia, United States, with the ZIP code of 24128. The 2020 Census reports a population of 1,767 in the community. It is located in a valley between Salt Pond Mountain, Sherman's Nose and Gap Mountain.

== Description ==
The origin of the town's name is uncertain. It may have been derived from the name of one of the first settlers in the area, Captain Newport. Other accounts describe the name as referring to the town being a new trading post and hence called Newport. A settlement on the Virginia coast, now known as Newport News, attempted to take away the name but a court held that Newport, being the older of the two, could keep its name.

The community is just south of the Sinking Creek Valley Cluster and southeast of the Mountain Lake Wilderness Cluster, areas in the Jefferson National Forest designated by the Wilderness Society as containing "Mountain Treasures".

== History ==
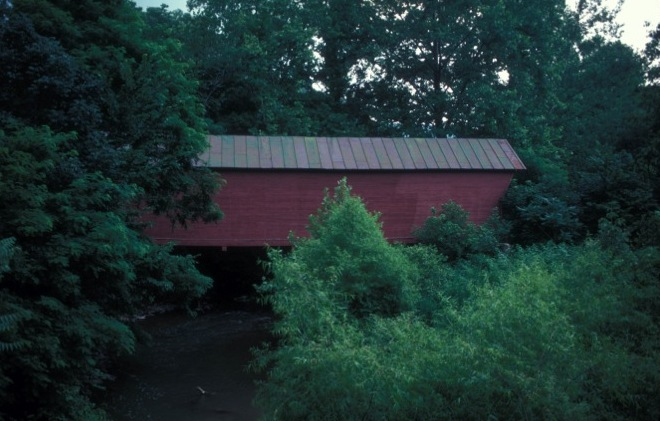
Covered Bridge over Sinking Creek near Newport, 1915

As evidenced by Indian relics such as tomahawks and arrowheads, the area was once a hunting ground when settlers first arrived. The town was on the route of a stagecoach line running from Yellow Sulphur Springs in Montgomery County and continuing on to West Virginia, then part of Virginia. During the Civil War a battle was fought around the town with armies located on adjacent hills.

A fire destroyed most of the town on April 1, 1902, leaving only a few residences, two churches and some old stables. Places lost to the fire included Keister's Tannery, a Mason Hall, Miller's Store, Smith's Hotel, and a small drug store. An old slave house survived the fire providing shelter for the owners.

Newport was a thriving community with many businesses. An iron foundry, located on Sinking Creek, made pig iron from ore mined near Newport. A woolen mill in Newport obtained power from a 37-foot diameter overshot water wheel. The mill was later converted into a woodworking plant, then into a blacksmith shop and then into an automobile workshop. There were several mills including the Zell Mill and the Payne Mill. The town had three distilleries, each with a bar room.

== Notable people ==
- Bob Porterfield, baseball player
- Mike Williams, baseball player
- Yancey Strickler, co-founder of Kickstarter
