= Virginia State Route 100 =

State highway in southwestern Virginia, US

State Route 100

Route information
- Maintained by VDOT
- Length: 53.31 mi (85.79 km)
- Existed: 1933–present

Major junctions
- South end: US 221 / SR 669 in Hillsville
- I-81 / US 11 near Draper; SR 99 at McAdam; US 11 in Dublin; SR 42 at Poplar Hill; US 460 Bus. in Pearisburg
- North end: SR 61 in Narrows

Location
- Country: United States
- State: Virginia
- Counties: Carroll, Wythe, Pulaski, Giles

Highway system
- Virginia Routes; Interstate; US; Primary; Secondary; Byways; History; HOT lanes
← SR 99	→ SR 101

State Route 100 (SR 100) is a primary state highway in the U.S. state of Virginia. The state highway runs 53.31 miles (85.79 km) from U.S. Route 221 (US 221) in Hillsville north to SR 61 in Narrows. SR 100 is one of the major highways of the New River Valley, connecting Narrows and Pearisburg in Giles County with Dublin, Pulaski (via US 11), and Interstate 81 (I-81) in Pulaski County.

== Route description ==
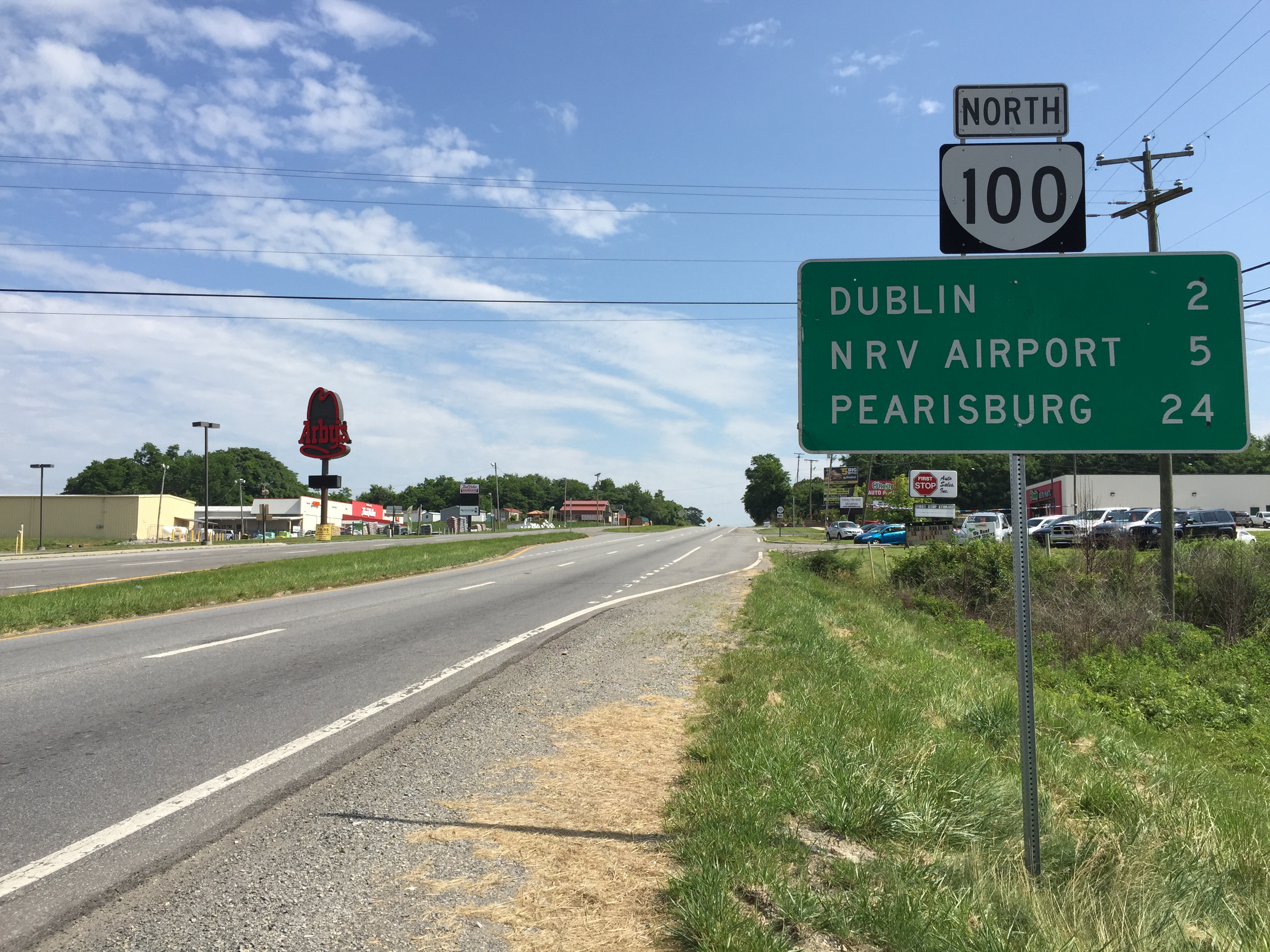
View north along SR 100 just south of Dublin

SR 100 begins at an intersection with US 221 (Floyd Pike) at the eastern edge of the town of Hillsville. The state highway heads north as two-lane undivided Sylvatus Smith Highway through northeastern Carroll County. SR 100 passes through the hamlet of Sylvatus before entering Wythe County and crossing Little Reed Island Creek. The state highway, whose name is now Wysor Highway, crosses the New River at Barren Springs then enters Pulaski County. SR 100 continues north to its cloverleaf interchange with I-81 south of Draper Mountain. The roadway continues north as US 11 (Lee Highway) across the mountain to Pulaski; US 11 also heads south along I-81 toward Wytheville.

SR 100 joins I-81 as the Interstate heads northeast toward Roanoke. The two highways are paralleled by frontage roads as they pass through a diamond interchange with SR 658 (Greenbriar Road) at Draper and a partial cloverleaf interchange with SR 99 (Count Pulaski Drive) at McAdam. The old alignment of SR 100, now designated SR F-047 (Kirby Road), continues to parallel the Interstate as the highways cross Peak Creek. Near the community of Newbern, I-81 and SR 100 diverge at a diamond interchange that serves as the eastern terminus of SR F-047.

SR 100 heads north as Cleburn Boulevard, a four-lane divided highway that passes by the industrial area of Burlington Mills before passing under a rail spur that serves the Radford Army Ammunition Plant to the east. Just north of the rail spur, the state highway enters the town of Dublin, where it crosses over Norfolk Southern Railway's Pulaski District rail line immediately before a partial cloverleaf interchange with US 11 (Lee Highway) adjacent to the main campus of New River Community College. SR 100 passes New River Valley Airport before crossing Little Walker Mountain. The northbound direction of the highway has a runaway truck ramp on the descent to Little Walker Creek, which the highway crosses while reducing to a two-lane undivided road just before entering Giles County at the south end of Little Walker Creek's gorge through Walker Mountain.

SR 100 continues north as Pulaski–Giles Turnpike, which crosses Walker Creek at its confluence with Little Walker Creek and intersects SR 42 (Blue Grass Trail) at Poplar Hill. The state highway expands to a four-lane divided highway again at Staffordsville, north of which the highway leaves the vicinity of Walker Creek. The two directions of SR 100 follow different alignments—northbound straight and southbound curvy—south of Pearisburg. The state highway enters the town of Pearisburg on Main Street, which reduces to an undivided highway and then two lanes. In the center of town, SR 100 intersects US 460 Business (Wenonah Avenue) and runs concurrently with the U.S. Highway on Main Street through downtown. At the north end of downtown, SR 100 veers northwest on Main Street, which is again four lanes, while US 460 Business heads north to its terminus at US 460. At the west end of town, SR 100 veers west onto two-lane Narrows Road, which parallels the south side of the New River and Norfolk Southern's East River District rail line to the town of Narrows. The state highway enters town as Main Street and reaches its northern terminus at SR 61 (Monroe Street).

== Major intersections ==
County	Location	mi	km	Destinations	Notes
Carroll	Hillsville	0.00	0.00	US 221 (Floyd Pike) / SR 669 (Hardscuffle Road) to I-77 / US 52 – Roanoke, Hillsville, Galax	Southern terminus
Carroll	Sylvatus			SR 693 (Sylvatus Smith Road)	former SR 100 north
Wythe	No major junctions				
Pulaski		18.41	29.63	I-81 south / US 11 (Lee Highway) – Pulaski, Bristol, West Virginia Turnpike	Southern end of I-81 concurrency; SR 100 south follows exit 89A
Pulaski	Draper	20.52	33.02	SR 658 – Draper	I-81 exit 92
Pulaski	McAdam	22.19	35.71	SR 99 north / Service Road (SR F047) – Pulaski	I-81 exit 94; signed as exits 94A (Service Road) and 94B (SR 99) northbound
Pulaski	Newbern	26.75	43.05	I-81 north / SR F047 (Old Route 100 Road) – Roanoke, Newbern, Wilderness Road Regional Museum	Northern end of I-81 concurrency; SR 100 north follows exit 98
Pulaski	Dublin	28.31	45.56	US 11 – Pulaski, Radford, Speedway	Partial cloverleaf interchange
Giles	Poplar Hill	37.84	60.90	SR 42 west (Walkers Creek Valley Road) – Bland	
Giles	Staffordsville			SR 730 (Eggleston Road) – Eggleston	former SR 42 east
Giles	Pearisburg	48.21	77.59	US 460 Bus. east (Wenonah Avenue)	South end of concurrency with US 460 Business
Giles	Pearisburg	48.59	78.20	US 460 Bus. to US 460 – Bluefield, Roanoke	North end of concurrency with US 460 Business
Giles	Narrows	53.31	85.79	SR 61 (Monroe Street)	Northern terminus
1.000 mi = 1.609 km; 1.000 km = 0.621 mi: Concurrency terminus

< SR 108	Spurs of SR 10; 1923–1928	SR 1010 >
< SR 211	District 2 State Routes; 1928–1933	SR 214 >
