= Virginia State Route 99 =

State highway in Pulaski County, Virginia, US

State Route 99

Route information
- Maintained by VDOT
- Length: 5.20 mi (8.37 km)
- Existed: 1933–present

Major junctions
- South end: SR F047 at McAdam
- I-81 / SR 100 in McAdam; US 11 in Pulaski
- North end: SR 738 in Pulaski

Location
- Country: United States
- State: Virginia
- Counties: Pulaski

Highway system
- Virginia Routes; Interstate; US; Primary; Secondary; Byways; History; HOT lanes
← SR 98	→ SR 100

State Route 99 (SR 99) is a primary state highway in the U.S. state of Virginia. The state highway runs 5.20 miles (8.37 km) from the north town limit of Pulaski east to SR F-047 just east of Interstate 81 (I-81) and SR 100 at McAdam.

== Route description ==
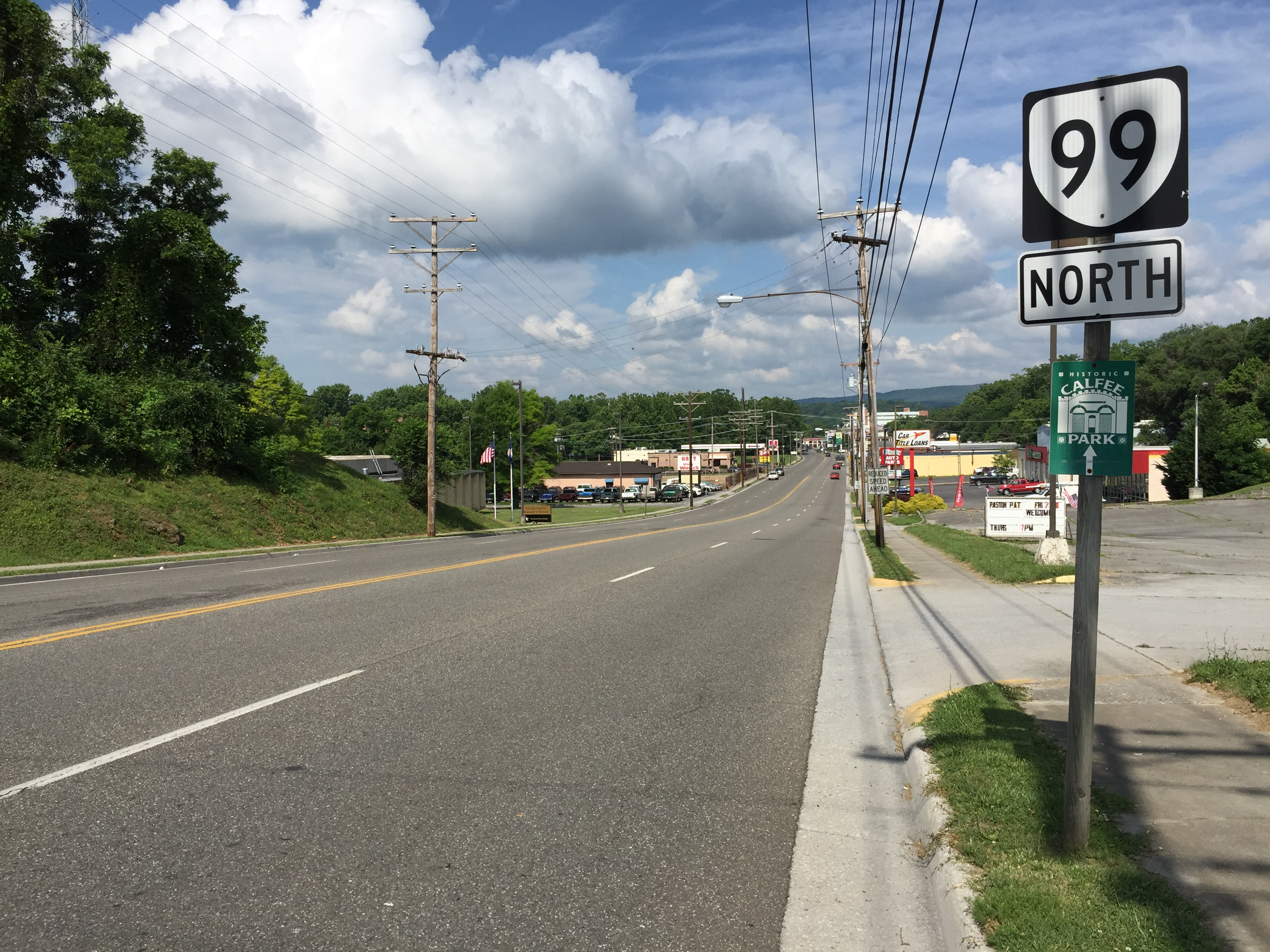
View north along SR 99 in Pulaski

SR 99 begins at the north town limit of Pulaski. The highway continues north into unincorporated Pulaski County as SR 738 (Robinson Tract Road). SR 99 heads south as two-lane undivided Randolph Avenue. It then goes onto Main Street, which parallels Peak Creek through downtown. One block to the east, SR 99 intersects U.S. Route 11 (Washington Avenue). Two blocks east of US 11, Main Street becomes a four-lane divided highway. SR 99 gains a median west of Bob White Boulevard, where the highway reduces to two lanes, begins to curve to the south, and crosses Norfolk Southern Railway's Pulaski District and Peak Creek. At the east town limit of Pulaski, the state highway becomes Count Pulaski Drive, which expands to a four-lane divided highway shortly before reaching its partial cloverleaf interchange with I-81 and SR 100 and, just to the south, its eastern terminus at SR F-047 (Kirby Road) in the hamlet of McAdam.

== History ==
SR 99 east of downtown Pulaski was initially part of State Route 10, supplemented with U.S. Route 11 in 1926. In the early 1930s, US 11 was rerouted along its current route south of Pulaski, but SR 10 remained. The road from Pulaski northwest for 6.20 miles (9.98 km) was added to the state highway system in 1932 as State Route 228. In the 1933 renumbering, SR 228, as well as SR 212 north of McAdam, became State Route 99. (The rest of SR 212 became State Route 100.) The rest of the road to the Bland County line was added in 1936, and in 1937 it was completed to SR 42 at Mechanicsburg. In 1952, the state decided to transfer the whole road northwest of Pulaski to the secondary system "when present primary funds set up for its improvement are expended"; the former SR 99 became State Route 738 then.

From 1981 to about 2021, VA 99 was split into a one-way pair at the west edge of downtown, with the Main Street portion being eastbound-only. Westbound VA 99 had to take 3^{rd} Street to reach Randolph Ave. The divided highway begins at what used to be the eastern end of the one-way split. Despite both roads now being two-way, westbound VA 99 is still signed for 3^{rd} Street. Eastbound is also still signed as needing to take 4^{th} Street, then U.S. 11 for two blocks.

== Major intersections ==
The entire route is in Pulaski County.

Location	mi	km	Destinations	Notes
McAdam	0.00	0.00	SR F047 (Old Route 100 Road) – McAdam, Draper	Southern terminus; former SR 100
McAdam	0.19	0.31	I-81 (SR 100) – Roanoke, Bristol	Exit 94 (I-81)
Pulaski	3.77	6.07	US 11 (Washington Avenue)	There was formerly a two-block overlap here in the southbound direction.
Pulaski	5.20	8.37	SR 738 (Robinson Tract Road)	Pulaski town limit; northern terminus
1.000 mi = 1.609 km; 1.000 km = 0.621 mi

< SR 227	District 2 State Routes; 1928–1933	none
