= Wytheville Historic District =

Historic district in Virginia, United States

- U.S. National Register of Historic Places
- U.S. Historic district
- Virginia Landmarks Register
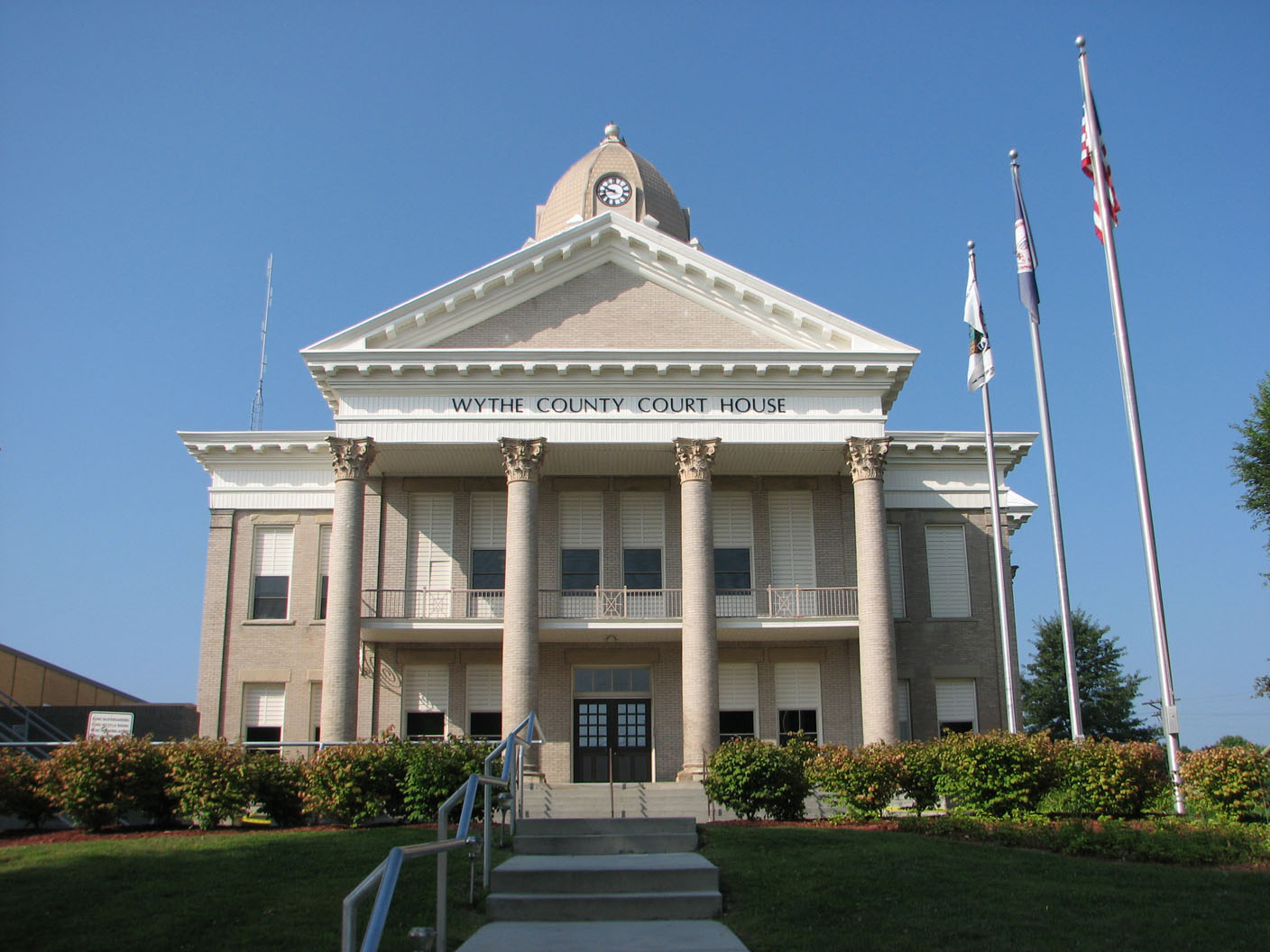
- Wythe County Courthouse, August 2006

- Location within Virginia Location within the United States
- Location: Roughly bounded by Monroe, Eleventh, Jefferson and Twelfth Sts. and W. Railroad Ave., Wytheville, Virginia
- Coordinates: 36°56′47″N 81°04′55″W
- Area: 170 acres (69 ha)
- Built: 1790
- Architect: Miller, Morris C.
- Architectural style: Mid 19th Century Revival, Late Victorian, Late 19th And 20th Century Revivals
- NRHP reference No.: 94001179
- VLR No.: 139-0029

Significant dates
- Added to NRHP: September 30, 1994
- Designated VLR: August 17, 1994

Wytheville Historic District is a national historic district located at Wytheville, Wythe County, Virginia. The district encompasses 245 contributing buildings in the historic core of the town of Wytheville. They are primarily residential and commercial buildings and structures dating from about the 1830s to early 1940s. Notable buildings include the Fleming K. Rich House (1830s), Edith Bolling Galt Wilson Birthplace, Ephraim McGavock House (1858), Holy Trinity Lutheran Church (1876), Wytheville AM&O station (1873), Wythe County Courthouse (1902), George Wythe Hotel (1927), Millwald Theatre (1928), Trinkle Mansion, and Wytheville Municipal Building (1929), The Haller-Gibboney Rock House and St. John's Episcopal Church are located in the district and listed separately.

It was listed on the National Register of Historic Places in 1994.
