= Pulaski Historic Commercial District =

Historic district in Virginia, United States

- U.S. National Register of Historic Places
- U.S. Historic district
- Virginia Landmarks Register
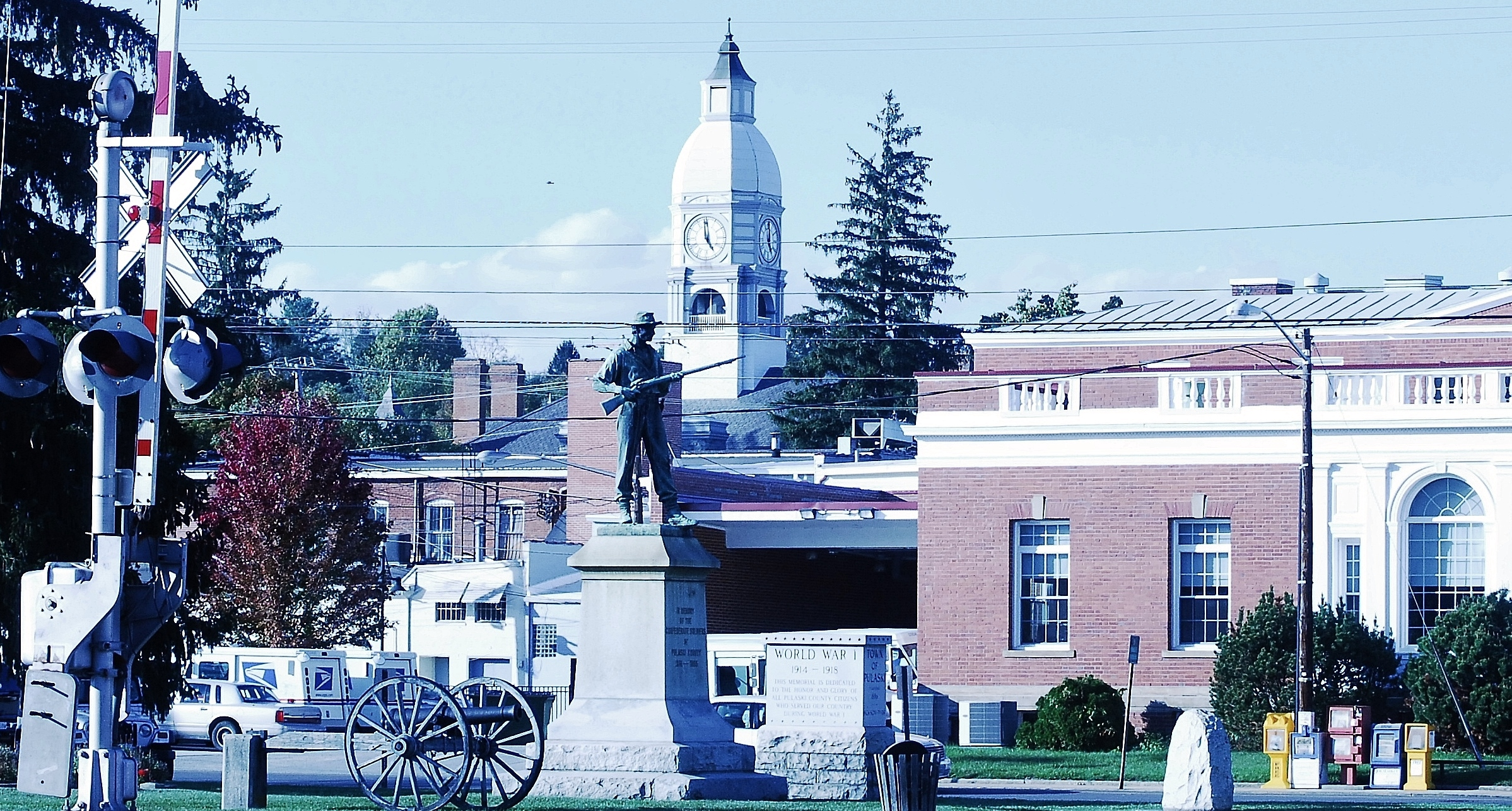

- Location within Virginia Location within the United States
- Location: Roughly bounded by Third St., Madison Ave., Norfolk & Western RR tracks, and Randolph Ave., Pulaski, Virginia
- Coordinates: 37°04′24″N 80°41′30″W
- Area: 46 acres (19 ha)
- Built: 1886
- Architectural style: Colonial Revival, Classical Revival, Tudor Revival
- NRHP reference No.: 86000405
- VLR No.: 125-0005

Significant dates
- Added to NRHP: March 13, 1986
- Designated VLR: December 17, 1985

Pulaski Historic Commercial District is a national historic district located at Pulaski, Pulaski County, Virginia. It encompasses 78 contributing buildings and 1 contributing site in the central business district of the town of Pulaski. It includes a variety of governmental, commercial, industrial, and institutional buildings dated primarily to the late-19th and early-20th century. Notable buildings include the MaGill building, B. D. Smith and Bros., building, Elks Theatre and building (c. 1911), former high school (c. 1913–1920), freight depot (1907), Pulaski Grocery Company building, the General Chemical Company, Christ Episcopal Church (1908), and the Appalachian Power Company building (c. 1940). The Dalton Theatre Building and Pulaski County Courthouse are located in the district and listed separately.

It was added to the National Register of Historic Places in 1986.
