= KPSK =

KPSK may refer to:

- KPSK Stal Mielec, a Polish women's volleyball team based in Mielec
- KPSK, the ICAO airport code for New River Valley Airport, Pulaski County, Virginia, United States
- KPSK, the Kolkata Metro station code for Park Street metro station, West Bengal, India
