= Boom Furnace, Virginia =

- Unincorporated community
- Location within Virginia Location within the United States
- Coordinates: 36°55′14″N 80°46′09″W
- Country: United States
- State: Virginia
- County: Pulaski
- Elevation: 1,929 ft (588 m)
- Time zone: UTC-5 (Eastern (EST))
  - Summer (DST): UTC-4 (EDT)
- ZIP code: 24347
- GNIS feature ID: 1494845

Boom Furnace is an unincorporated community in Pulaski County, in the U.S. state of Virginia. The name of the community derives from a nearby furnace that made loud booming sounds when started. The furnace began operation in 1882 and, when it ended operations in 1906, was the last "cold blast, water power charcoal" furnace in Virginia. The furnace still stands today.
