= Newbern Historic District =

Historic district in Virginia, United States

- U.S. National Register of Historic Places
- U.S. Historic district
- Virginia Landmarks Register
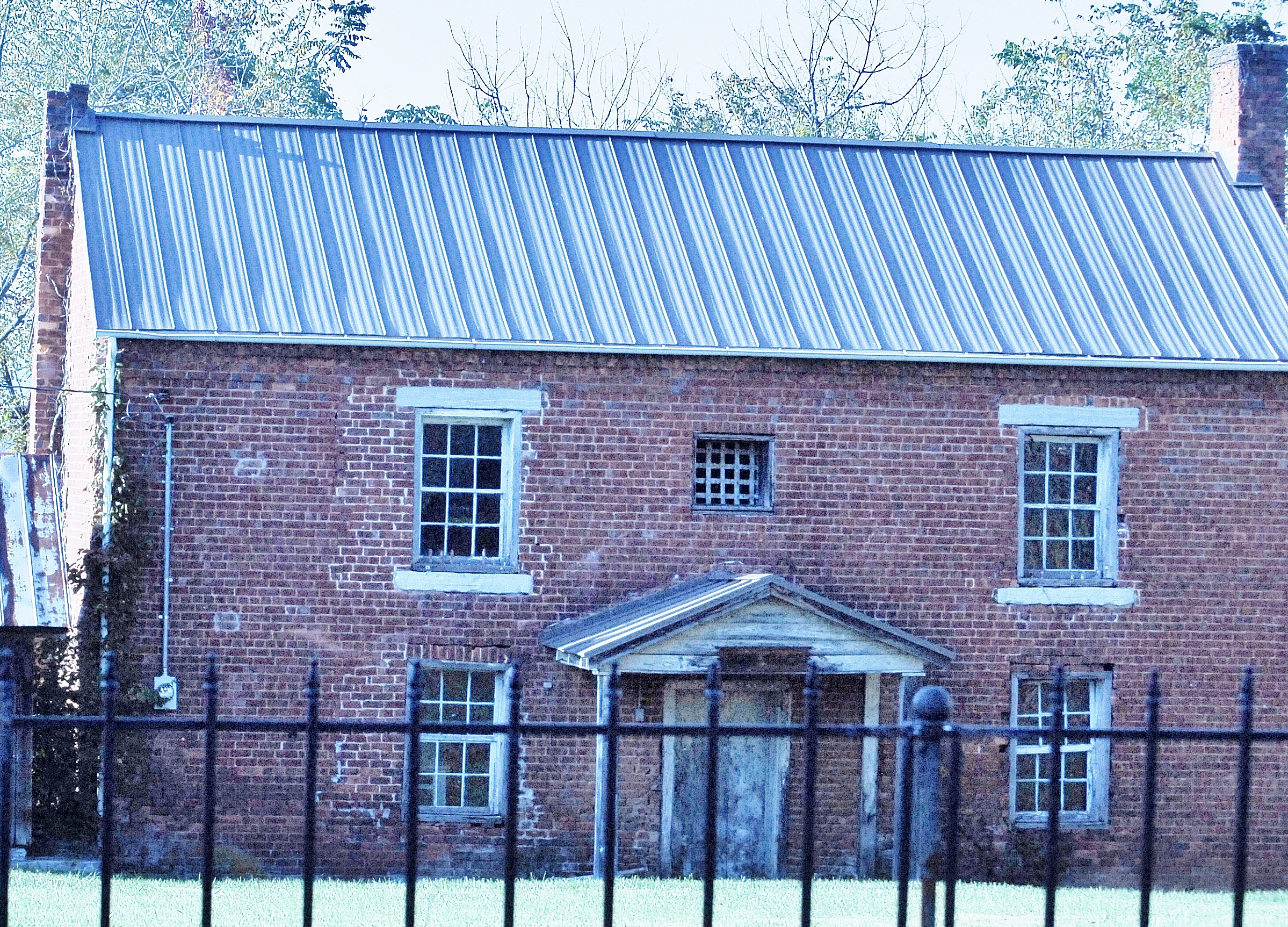
- Old Courthouse

- Location within Virginia Location within the United States
- Location: VA 611, Newbern, Virginia
- Coordinates: 37°04′24″N 80°41′30″W
- Area: 56 acres (23 ha)
- Architectural style: Stick/eastlake
- NRHP reference No.: 79003073
- VLR No.: 077-0022

Significant dates
- Added to NRHP: June 4, 1979
- Designated VLR: February 18, 1975

Newbern Historic District is a national historic district located at Newbern, Pulaski County, Virginia. It encompasses 47 contributing buildings in the town of Newbern. It includes a variety of residential, commercial, and institutional buildings dated as early as the early-19th century. Notable buildings include the Adam Hance House, known locally as the "Summer Resort," Duncan-Meredith House, Colley house, the Haney Tavern, Vermillion and Stone's store, the Christian Church (1860), and Old Jail (1839).

It was added to the National Register of Historic Places in 1979.
