= Tiny Town =

Tiny Town or Tinytown may refer to:

- Tiny Town (miniature park), Springfield, Missouri
- Tiny Town (amusement park), Morrison, Colorado
- Tiny Town, Kentucky, an unincorporated community in Todd County
- Tinytown, Virginia, an unincorporated community in Pulaski County
- Tiny Town (band), an American rock-blues band

== See also ==
- The Terror of Tiny Town
