= Kayoulah, Virginia =

Unincorporated community in Virginia, US

Coordinates: 36°54′59″N 80°46′26″W

Kayoulah is an unincorporated community in Pulaski County, in the U.S. state of Virginia.
