= John Hoge House =

Historic house in Virginia, United States

- U.S. National Register of Historic Places
- Virginia Landmarks Register
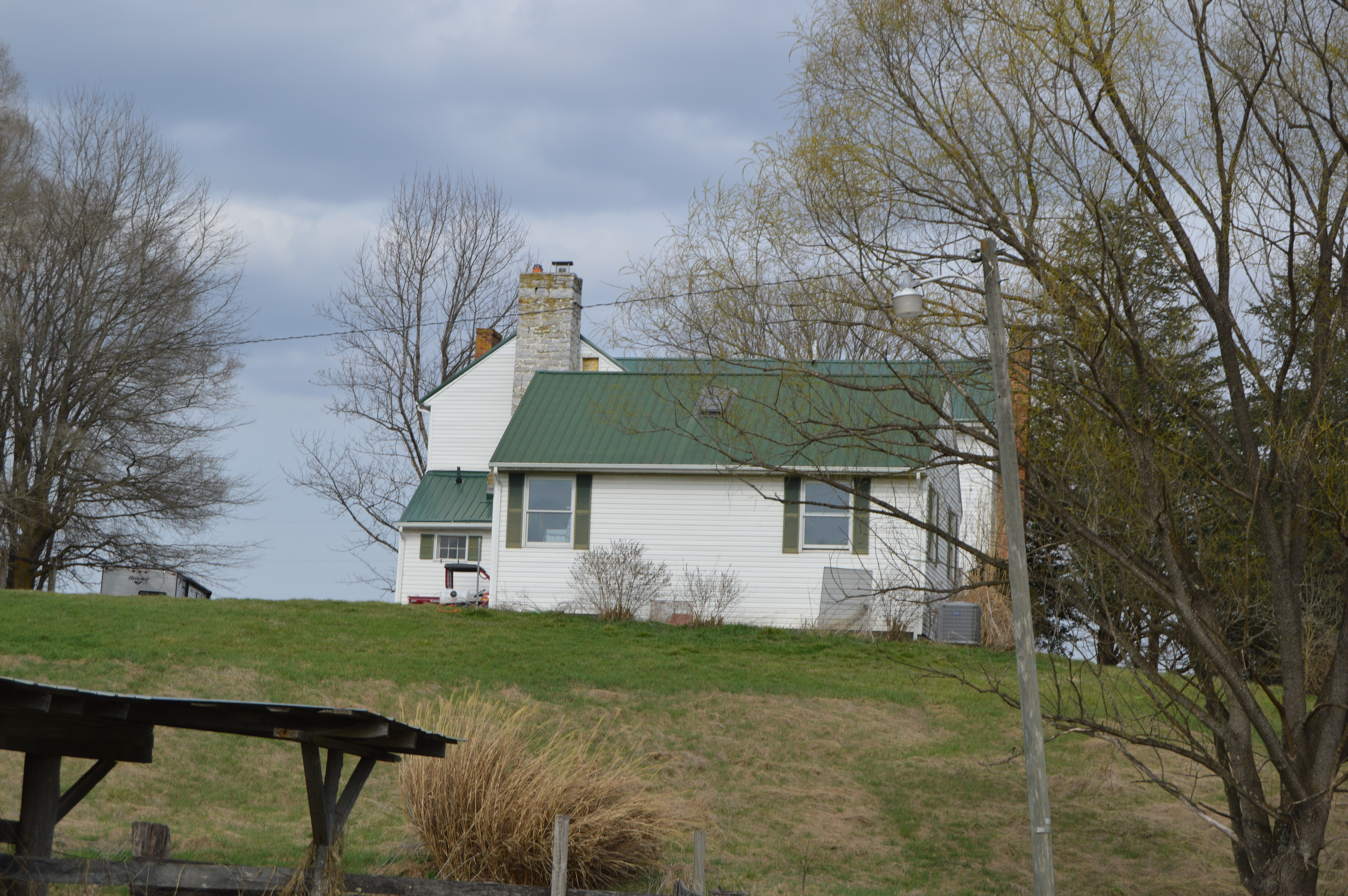
- Rear of the house

- Location within Virginia Location within the United States
- Location: NW side of VA 617, Belspring, Virginia
- Coordinates: 37°10′42″N 80°37′49″W
- Area: 13.5 acres (5.5 ha)
- Built: c. 1800
- Architectural style: Hall-Parlor
- NRHP reference No.: 88001320
- VLR No.: 077-0154

Significant dates
- Added to NRHP: August 25, 1988
- Designated VLR: April 19, 1988

John Hoge House, also known as the Crozier Eaton House, is a historic home located at Belspring, Pulaski County, Virginia. The original section was built about 1800, as a two-story, log dwelling with a hall-parlor plan. In the third quarter of the 19th century, a major frame addition was made to the house, transforming it to a two-story, three-bay, central hall plan dwelling. In addition, Greek Revival decorative additions were made to the interior.

It was added to the National Register of Historic Places in 1988.
