= Reed Junction, Virginia =

Unincorporated community in Virginia, US

Coordinates: 36°55′53″N 80°45′07″W

Reed Junction is an unincorporated community in Pulaski County, in the U.S. state of Virginia.
