= Trinkle =

Trinkle is a surname. Notable people with the surname include:

- Elbert Lee Trinkle (1876–1939), American politician and 49th Governor of Virginia
- Jeff Trinkle, American computer scientist
- Ken Trinkle (1919–1976), American baseball player

== See also ==
- Trinkle Mansion, a historic building in Wytheville, Virginia, United States
- 24204 Trinkle, a main-belt asteroid
