= Pulaski Historic Residential District =

Historic district in Virginia, United States

- U.S. National Register of Historic Places
- U.S. Historic district
- Virginia Landmarks Register
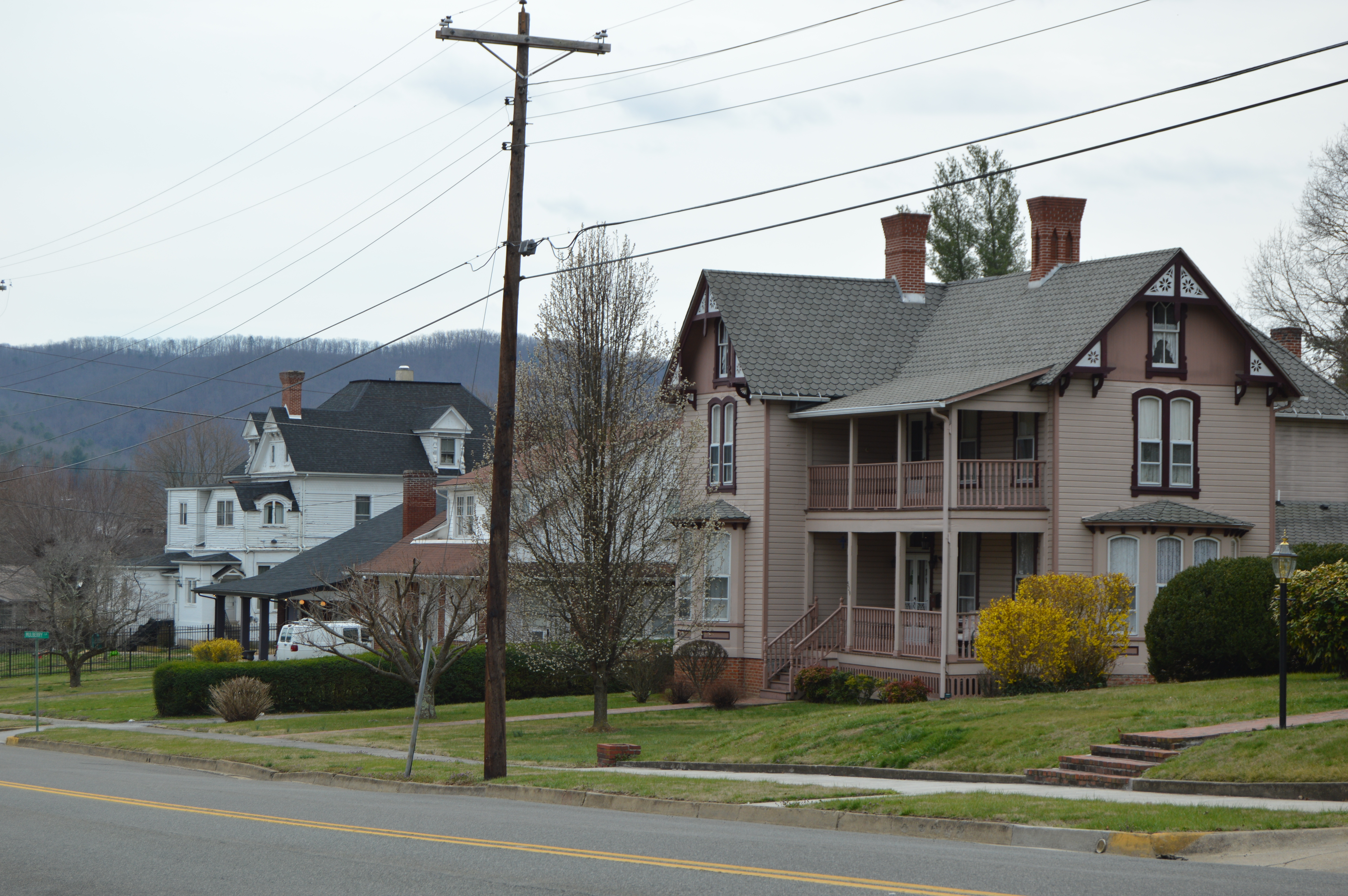
- Jefferson Avenue

- Location within Virginia Location within the United States
- Location: Roughly bounded by Eleventh St., Prospect, Madison and Washington Aves., Second St., and Henry Ave., Pulaski, Virginia
- Coordinates: 37°03′10″N 80°46′56″W
- Area: 145 acres (59 ha)
- Architect: Kronalier, M.; Et al.
- Architectural style: Late 19th And Early 20th Century American Movements, Late 19th And 20th Century Revivals, Late Victorian
- NRHP reference No.: 88001216
- VLR No.: 125-0006

Significant dates
- Added to NRHP: August 11, 1988
- Designated VLR: February 16, 1988

Pulaski Historic Residential District is a national historic district located at Pulaski, Pulaski County, Virginia. It encompasses 278 contributing buildings in a primarily residential section of the town of Pulaski. The dwellings are primarily frame and brick residences dating from the 1880s through the 1940s. They include the large homes of the factory managers, and the more modest homes of workers. Notable non-residential buildings include the Trinity Evangelical Lutheran Church (c. 1890), the First Baptist Church (125-6-280) (c. 1892), the First Christian Church (Disciples of Christ) (c. 1906), the law office of Samuel N. Hurst, Masonic Lodge, and Pulaski Women's Club.

It was added to the National Register of Historic Places in 1988.
