= Cowan, Virginia =

Unincorporated community in Virginia, US

Coordinates: 37°11′07″N 80°34′37″W

Cowan is an unincorporated community in Pulaski County, in the U.S. state of Virginia.
