= Mount Olivet, Virginia =

Unincorporated community in Virginia, US

Coordinates: 37°02′40″N 80°48′36″W

Mount Olivet is an unincorporated community in Pulaski County, in the U.S. state of Virginia.
