= Loretto (Wytheville, Virginia) =

Historic house in Virginia, United States

- Loretto Historic Mansion
- U.S. National Register of Historic Places
- Virginia Landmarks Register
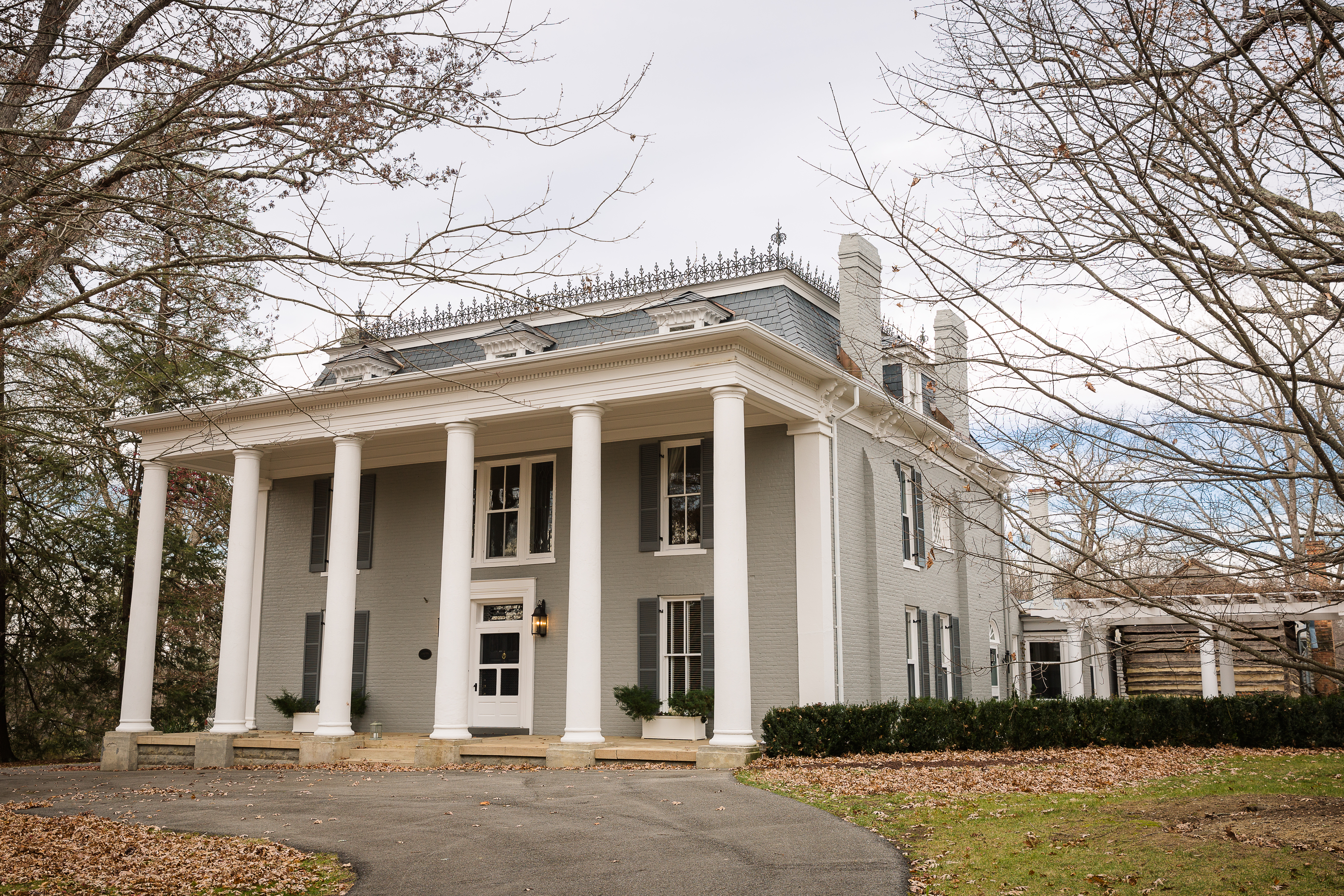
- Front of Loretto

- Location within Virginia Location within the United States
- Location: 190 Peppers Ferry Rd., Wytheville, Virginia
- Coordinates: 36°57′26″N 81°4′49″W
- Area: 13 acres (5.3 ha)
- Built: 1852
- Architect: Miller, Morris C.
- Architectural style: Second Empire, Greek Revival, Classical Revival
- NRHP reference No.: 94001093
- VLR No.: 139-0015

Significant dates
- Added to NRHP: September 8, 1994
- Designated VLR: June 15, 1994

Loretto is a historic home located at Wytheville, Wythe County, Virginia.

== History ==
Loretto, just north of the historic downtown Wytheville, was originally built in 1852 for William Alexander Stuart, brother of General J.E.B. Stuart. Virginia Governor Henry Carter Stuart (1914-1918), William's son, may have been born in the house. Loretto's second owner, Benjamin Rush Floyd, was a state senator and son of another Virginia governor, John Floyd (1830-1834). As residents, Benjamin and his wife Nancy named the property after the Loreto Shrine in Italy.

Loretto's size doubled in the late nineteenth century. Robert Crockett, Loretto's fourth owner, Victorianized the building with a third floor and slate mansard roof. The Campbell family lived in the mansion from 1888 to 1992 and during that time added a grand spindlework stair railing of the Second-Empire style (1889), a Doric portico on the front facade (1911), and a porte cohere and pergola on the side elevations of the home (1927).

== Structure ==
The original section, built in 1852, is a two-story, single-pile, center-passage-plan dwelling that now forms the rear section of the house. The two-story brick front section was added in the 1880s, and has a mansard roof in the Second Empire style. The interior has Greek Revival style decorative details. A two-story front portico was added in 1911, a one-story rear brick ell was added in 1912, and a porte-cochère and pergola were added in 1927. Also on the property are the contributing log smokehouse (1850s), a double-pen, v-notched outdoor kitchen (1852), and a frame building known as the office.

It was listed on the National Register of Historic Places in 1994.

== Uses today ==
The current owners lived in Loretto from 1991 to 2014 and have renovated it as an event venue and conference space. It can be reserved for corporate conferences, educational seminars, house tours, and indoor recitals. Total indoor capacity is 50.
