= St. John's Lutheran Church and Cemetery =

Historic church and cemetery in Wythe County, Virginia, US

- U.S. National Register of Historic Places
- U.S. Historic district
- Virginia Landmarks Register
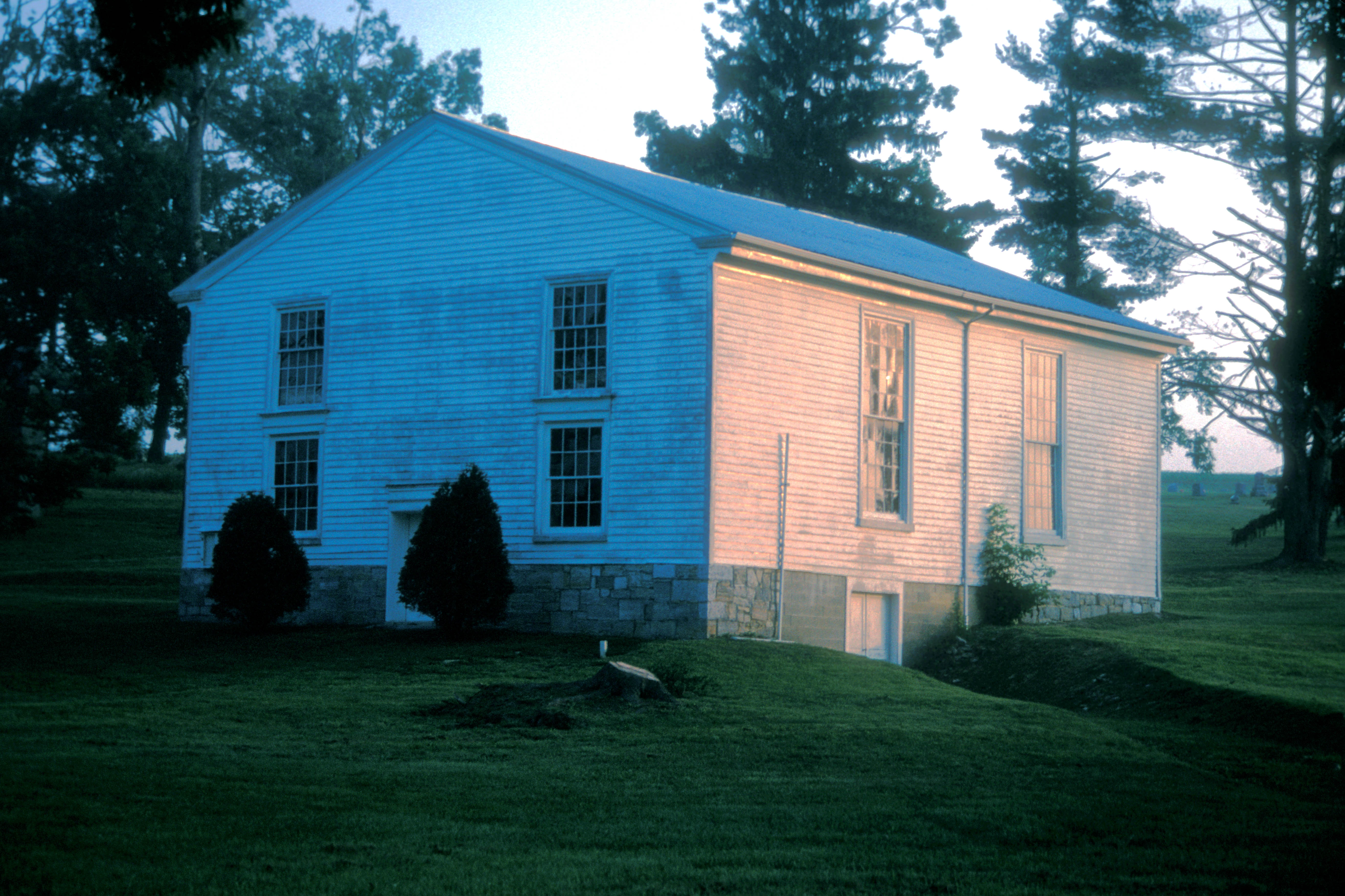

- Location within Virginia Location within the United States
- Location: NW of Wytheville at jct of U.S. 21/52 and I-81, near Wytheville, Virginia
- Coordinates: 36°57′54″N 81°06′03″W
- Area: 6 acres (2.4 ha)
- Built: 1812
- Architect: Krone, Laurence; Et al.
- Architectural style: Germanic
- NRHP reference No.: 78003047
- VLR No.: 139-5205

Significant dates
- Added to NRHP: January 26, 1978
- Designated VLR: April 19, 1978

St. John's Lutheran Church and Cemetery is a historic Evangelical Lutheran church and cemetery and national historic district near Wytheville, Virginia, United States. The church was built in 1854 and is a rectangular, three bay by two bay, frame church sheathed in weatherboard. It measures 45 feet by 55 feet, has a gable roof, and sits on a limestone basement. The auditorium has a gallery. The adjacent cemetery includes a notable group of approximately 30 early-19th century, German-style monuments.

It was listed on the National Register of Historic Places in 1978.
