= Newbern, Virginia =

Unincorporated community in Virginia, US

Newbern
- UIC
- Location within Virginia Location within the United States
- Coordinates: 37°04′24″N 80°41′26″W
- Country: United States
- State: Virginia
- County: Pulaski
- Established: 1839
- Founder: Cheryl Morris

Newbern is an unincorporated community in Pulaski County, in the U.S. state of Virginia. From 1839 until the courthouse burned in 1892, Newbern was the county seat of Pulaski County.

A large share of the early settlers being natives of Switzerland caused the name Newbern, after Bern, Switzerland, to be selected. The Newbern Historic District was listed on the National Register of Historic Places in 1979.

Adam Hance began the town of Newbern in 1810, where the Wilderness Road or "Great road" passed directly through his grant of 1,400 acres. This holding was approximately halfway between Christiansburg and Wytheville, Virginia. His home is located in the Newbern Historic District.

== Climate ==
The climate in this area features moderate differences between highs and lows, and there is adequate rainfall year-round. According to the Köppen Climate Classification system, Newbern has a marine west coast climate, abbreviated "Cfb" on climate maps.

== Bibliography ==
- Anderson, C. B. Business Records. 1884. Summary: Ledgers, daybooks, business journals, and other records, for accounts in Anderson's general store in Newbern, Pulaski County, Va. OCLC 28419754.
- Brown, Katharine L. and Nancy T. Sorrells. 2013. Into the Wilderness. Staunton, Virginia: Lot's Wife Publishing.
- Buchanan, William T. A Chronology of the Hance-Alexander Family of Pulaski County, Virginia and the Hance-Alexander House, 1768-1866. 1983. Thesis.
- Ellett, Anna Burton. Inscriptions on Tombstones in Cemeteries at Dublin, Newbern, New Dublin Presbyterian Church, Pulaski County, Virginia. Salt Lake City, Utah: Filmed by the Genealogical Society of Utah, 1970. Summary: Inscriptions are from a cemetery at Dublin, Newbern Cemetery near Dublin, and the cemetery of the New Dublin Presbyterian Church near Dublin.
- Harvey, Helen Martin. Wilderness Trail from Radford to Newbern. Roanoke, Va: WBRA-TV, 1974. Summary: Helen Harvey of New River Community College takes the viewer on an historically descriptive trip along part of the original Wilderness Road from Radford, Va., to Newbern, Va. OCLC 7809716.
- Larew Family Papers. 1864-1903. Archival materials. Abstract: The Larew papers are arranged in three sections. Folder 1 contains sympathy letters received from family and friends by Isaac Hall Larew of Pulaski County, Virginia in 1887. His wife, Gillie Augusta Glendy Larew (1846-1887), died in childbirth on April 8. Also included is a poem, "To a Departed Wife," and resolution passed in Mrs. Larew's honor by the Ladies Missionary Society of Newbern Presbyterian Church. Folder 2 contains letters from Isaac Hall Larew to his daughters Aldah and Xanda, who were students of Randolph Macon Woman's College in Lynchburg, Virginia. These letters were written between 1901 and 1903. Also included is a report card from college. Folder 3 contains miscellaneous materials, including accounts, a copy of Isaac Hall Larew's will, and letters. OCLC 86172393.

Gillie Aldah Larew (28 Jul 1882, Newbern, Virginia — 2 Jan 1977, Lynchburg, Virginia), a daughter of Gillie Augusta Glendy Larew, was one of the first American women who got a mathematics Ph.D.

- Lyons, Maxine. Historic Newberne, Founded 1810 Presents Historic Landmarks. Newbern, Va: Newbern Promotional Bureau, 1987.
- Mills, Sheryl. Newbern, Va.: A Rural Historic Village Looking for a Future. Senior project (B.L. Arch.)--Virginia Polytechnic Institute and State University, 1988, 1988. OCLC 19900483.
- Morgan, Clarita H., and Doris D. Morgan. Civil War Recruits from Newberne, Virginia, 1861-1865: Newbern, Pulaski County, Virginia . County Seat. [Place of publication not identified]: [publisher not identified], 1980.
- Newbern Extension Homemaker's Club (Newbern, Va.). Recipes of Olde Newberne. [S.l.]: Newbern Extension Homemaker's Club, 1987. Compiled by the Newbern Extension Homemaker's Club.
- Roberts, W. Keith. The House by the Wilderness Road. Dublin, Va: Pulaski Print. Co, 1993.
