= Trinkle Mansion =

Historic house in Virginia, United States

- U.S. Historic district – Contributing property
- Location within Virginia Location within the United States
- Location: 525 W. Main St., Wytheville, Virginia
- Coordinates: 36.9466°N 81.0871°W
- Built: 1912
- Architectural style: Classical Revival
- Part of: Wytheville Historic District (ID94001179)
- Added to NRHP: September 30, 1994

Trinkle Mansion is an historic building located in Wytheville, Virginia that is now a four-room bed and breakfast. It is a contributing property to the Wytheville Historic District.

== History ==
The Trinkle Mansion was built in 1912 by William Trinkle, the son of a prominent Wytheville family. William married a young woman by the name of Ethel and the young couple had two young children, a boy and a girl. William was a wealthy farm owner that oversaw 20,000 acres (81 km^{2}) of land. The house was built in a Classical Revival style and had unprecedented technology for the time period like a steam heating system and a built-in central vacuum system. The house is now on the National Register of Historic Places and the Virginia Landmarks Register as part of the Wytheville Historic District, added to the national register in 1994.

== Locale ==
Wytheville is a small town located in western Virginia The town contains a number of historical sites like the Haller-Gibboney Rock House Museum, Edith Bolling Wilson Birthplace Museum, and Wolf Creek Indian Village & Museum. There are also a number of hiking and biking trails that surround the town.

== See also ==
- National Register of Historic Places listings in Wythe County, Virginia
