= Burlington Mills, Virginia =

Unincorporated community in Virginia, US

Coordinates: 37°05′23″N 80°41′05″W

Burlington Mills is an unincorporated community in Pulaski County, in the U.S. state of Virginia.
