= New River, Virginia =

New River
- Census-designated place (CDP)
- Location within Shenandoah Valley Location within Virginia Location within the United States
- Coordinates: 37.139°N 80.590°W
- Country: United States
- State: Virginia
- County: Pulaski

New River is a census-designated place (CDP) in Pulaski County, Virginia, United States. As of the 2020 census, New River had a population of 237.

A post office was established as New River Depot in 1868. The community took its name from the New River, upon which it is situated.

== Demographics ==
Historical population
Census	Pop.	Note	%±
2020	237		—
U.S. Decennial Census; 2010 2020

New River was first listed as a census designated place in the 2010 U.S. census formed from part of Fairlawn CDP and additional area.
