= Wythe County Poorhouse Farm =

- U.S. National Register of Historic Places
- Virginia Landmarks Register
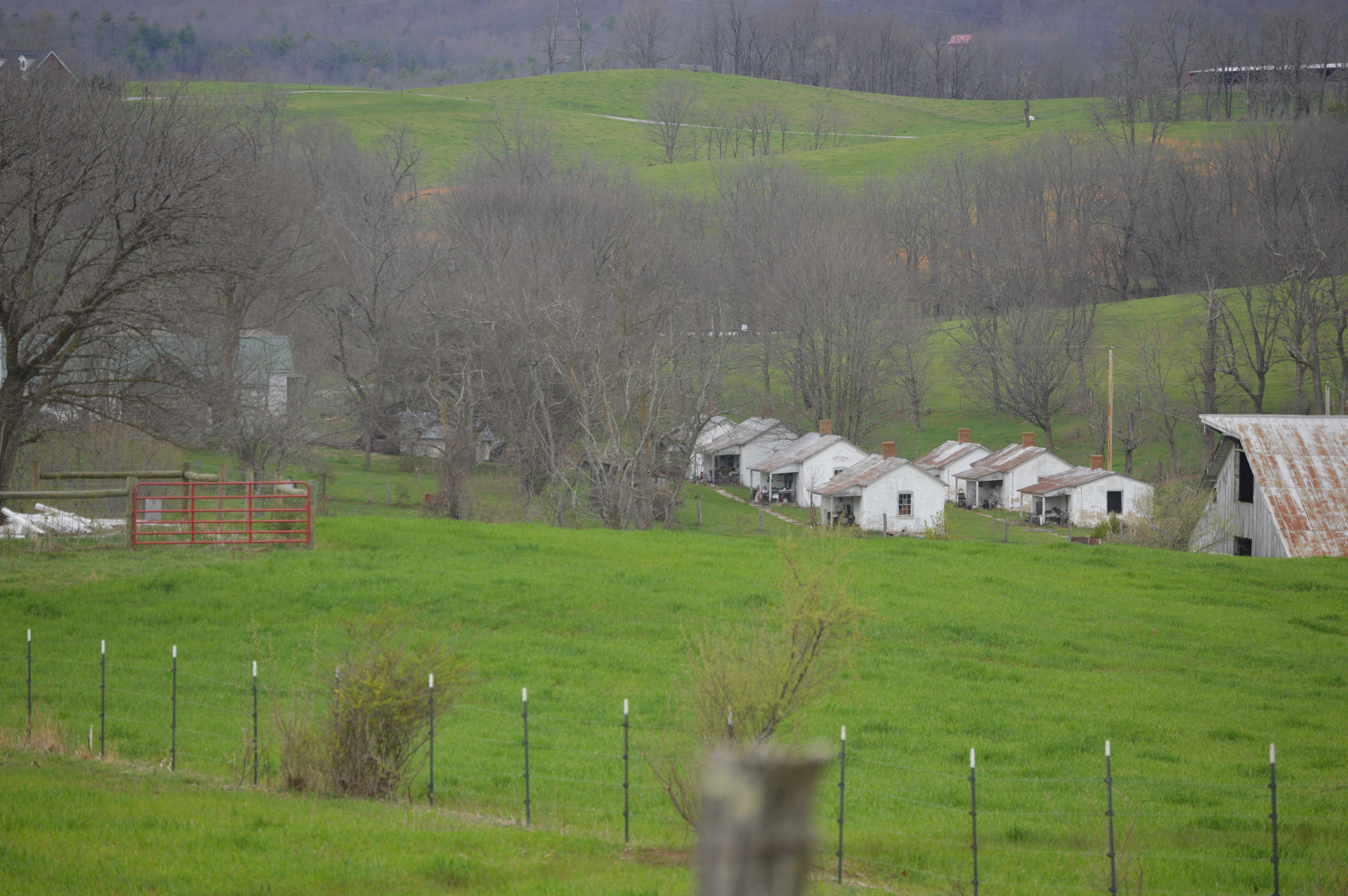
- Overview from the east

- Location within Virginia Location within the United States
- Location: VA 2, Peppers Ferry Rd., Wytheville, Virginia
- Coordinates: 36°58′54″N 81°1′42″W
- Area: 9.1 acres (3.7 ha)
- Built: 1858
- Architectural style: Queen Anne
- NRHP reference No.: 00000557
- VLR No.: 098-0030

Significant dates
- Added to NRHP: May 26, 2000
- Designated VLR: December 1, 1999

Wythe County Poorhouse Farm is a historic poor farm complex located at Wytheville, Wythe County, Virginia. The poor farm was established in 1858, and remained in operation until 1957. It was the second poor farm in Wythe County; the first was in operation from 1825 to 1858. The property includes the contributing Queen Anne style overseer's house (c. 1890s), eight pauper homes (c. 1858), a shed (c. 1920), a spring house (c. 1858), smokehouse (c. 1858), wash house (c. 1858), and chicken coop (c. 1900). The property is open to the public for visitation and historical interpretation.

It was listed on the National Register of Historic Places in 2000.
