= Dalton Theatre Building =

Historic theater in Pulaski County, Virginia, US

- U.S. National Register of Historic Places
- Virginia Landmarks Register
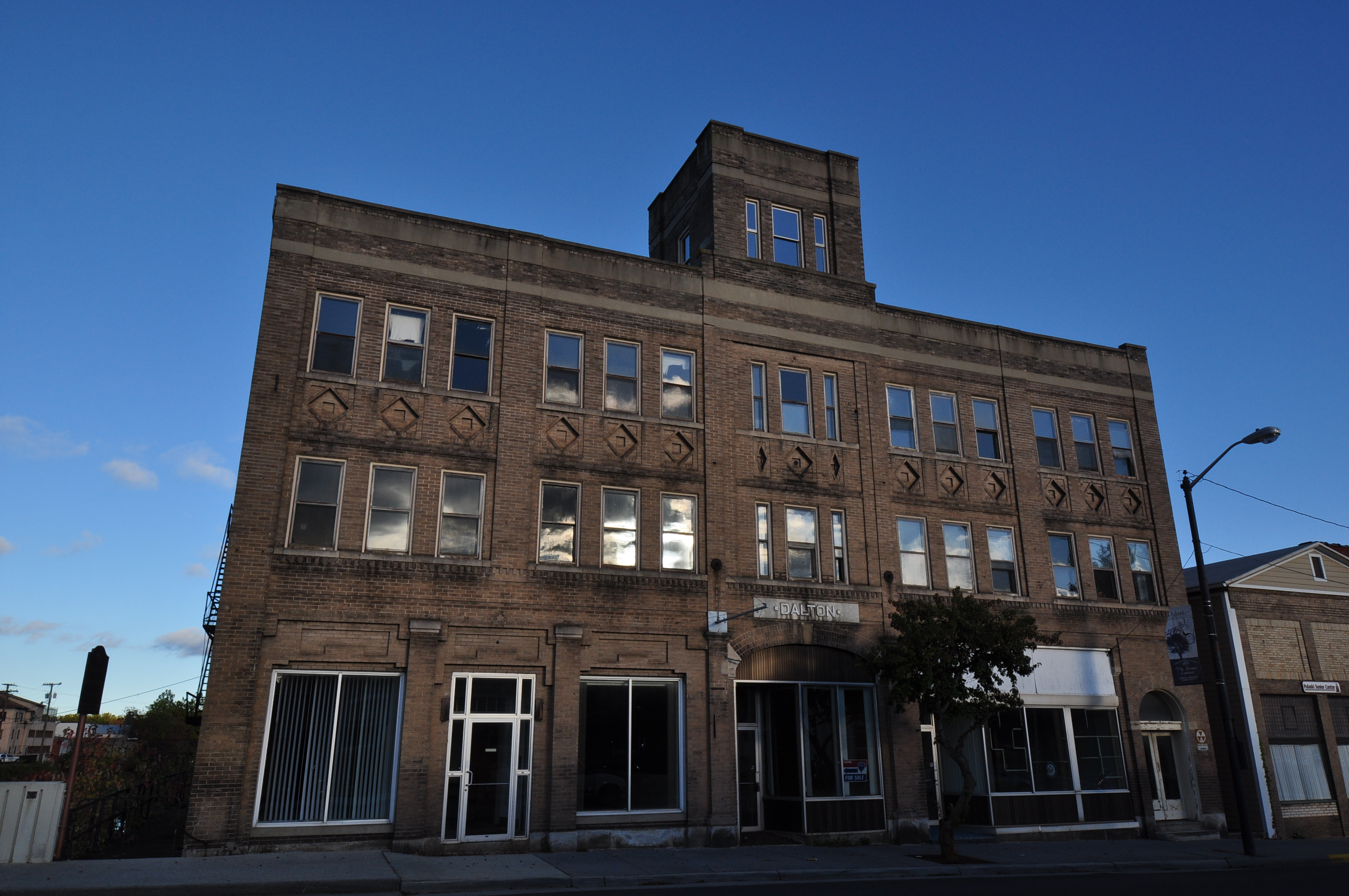
- Dalton Theatre Building, October 2013

- Location within Virginia Location within the United States
- Location: Washington Ave., Pulaski, Virginia
- Coordinates: 37°2′48″N 80°46′47″W
- Area: less than one acre
- Built: 1921
- Architect: Lombard, James C & Co.
- Architectural style: Late 19th And Early 20th Century American Movements, Beaux Arts
- NRHP reference No.: 79003074
- VLR No.: 125-0002

Significant dates
- Added to NRHP: May 7, 1979
- Designated VLR: November 16, 1977

Dalton Theatre Building is a historic theatre building located at Pulaski, Pulaski County, Virginia. It was built in 1921, and is a three-story, five-bay, brick Commercial Style building with a flat roof topped by a one-story square central tower. The theater was initially built for vaudeville, and had the largest stage of any theaters on the rail line from Richmond, Virginia to Tennessee. Following the development of talking films it was converted into a movie theater and showed films into the 1960s.

Facing the road on the ground floor are two storefronts that originally housed a bank and a drugstore. The upper two floors were used for offices as well as apartments for visiting performers. At the rear of the building was a gable-roofed auditorium, designed in the Beaux Arts style, and a plain five-story equipment tower serving the stage. The auditorium section of the building collapsed in 1982, however, and has been razed.

It was added to the National Register of Historic Places in 1979.
