= Wurno, Virginia =

Unincorporated community in Virginia, US

Coordinates: 37°04′17″N 80°43′24″W

Wurno is an unincorporated community in Pulaski County, in the U.S. state of Virginia.
