= Belspring, Virginia =

- Census-designated place (CDP)
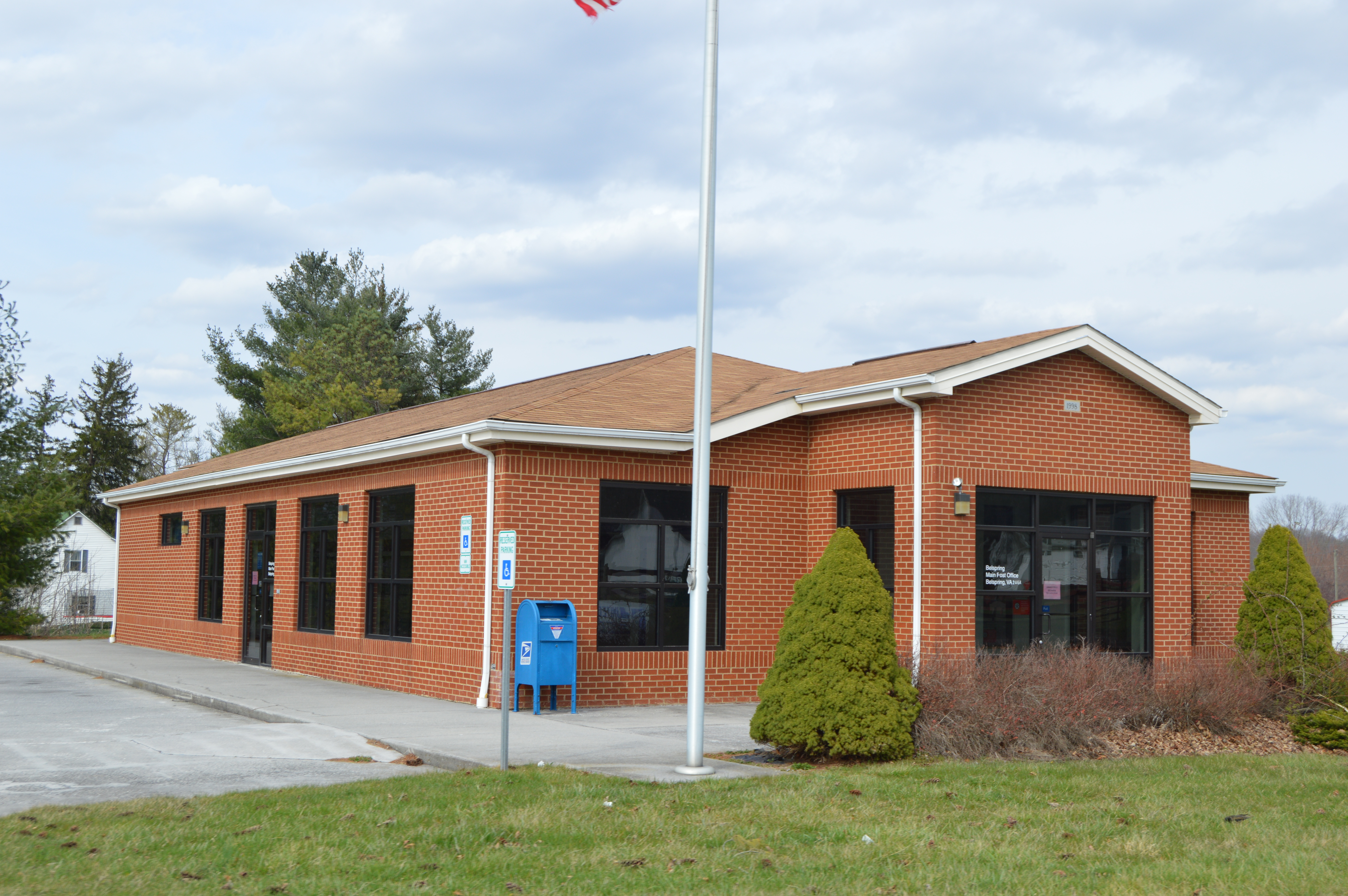
- Post office

- Location of Belspring in Virginia
- Coordinates: 37°11′27″N 80°36′29″W
- Country: United States
- State: Virginia
- County: Pulaski

Area
  - Total: 3.6 sq mi (9.3 km^{2})
  - Land: 3.6 sq mi (9.3 km^{2})
  - Water: 0 sq mi (0 km^{2})
- Elevation: 1,778 ft (542 m)

Population (2000)
  - Total: 176
  - Density: 49/sq mi (19/km^{2})
- Time zone: UTC-5 (EST)
  - Summer (DST): UTC-4 (EDT)
- ZIP code: 24058 (Pulaski)
- Area code: 540
- FIPS code: 51155
- GNIS feature ID: 1481619

Belspring is a census-designated place (CDP) in Pulaski County, Virginia, United States, located at an elevation of 1,778 feet (542 m) above sea level. It has the ZIP Code 24058 and the area code 540. As of the 2020 census, Belspring had a population of 204.

The John Hoge House was added to the National Register of Historic Places in 1988.

== Demographics ==
Historical population
Census	Pop.	Note	%±
2010	256		—
2020	204		−20.3%
U.S. Decennial Census; 2010 2020

Belspring was first listed as a census designated place in the 2010 U.S. census.
