= Hiwassee, Virginia =

- Census-designated place
- Location within Shenandoah Valley Location within Virginia Location within the United States
- Coordinates: 36.969°N 80.7154°W
- Country: United States
- State: Virginia
- County: Pulaski

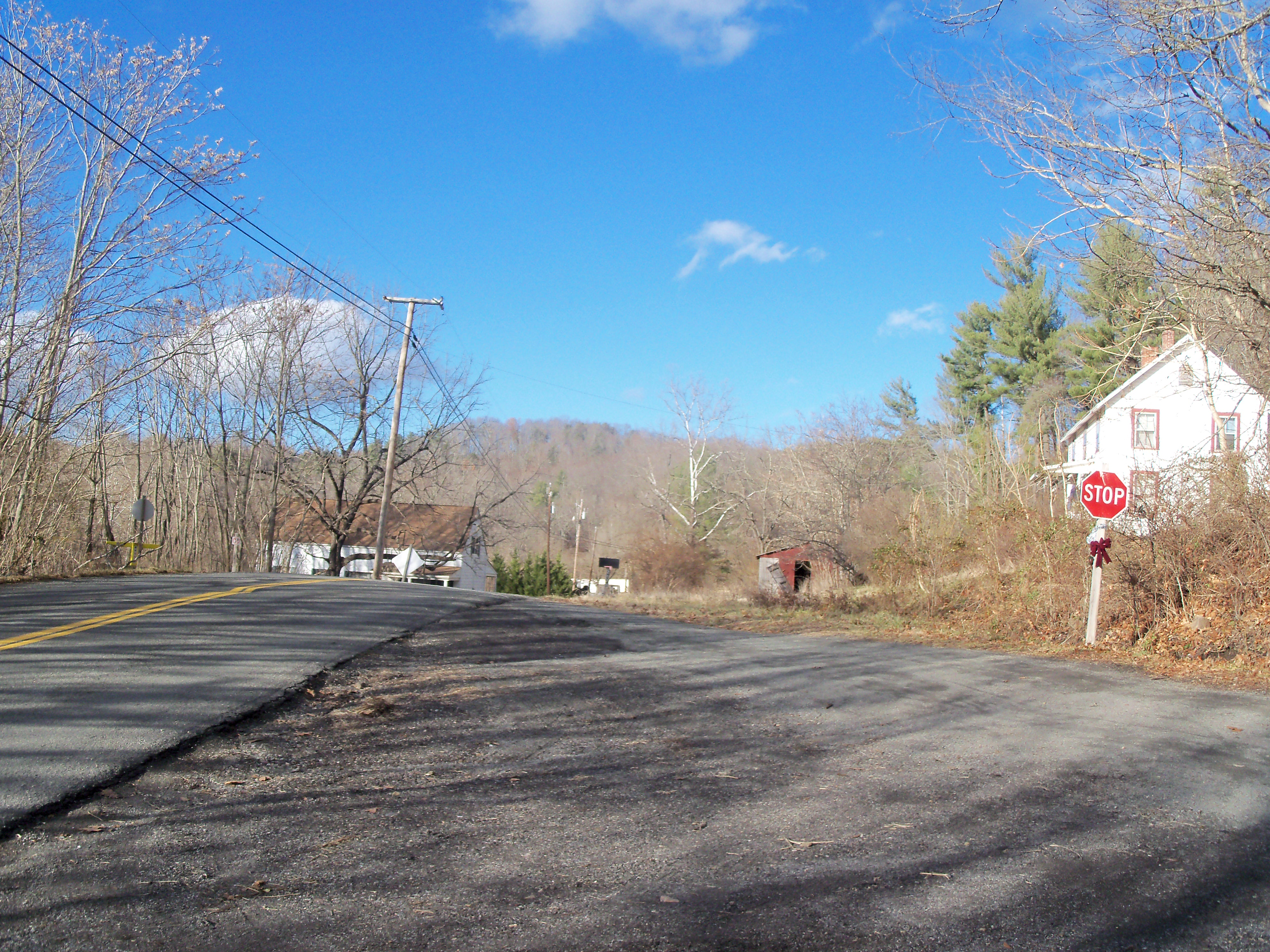
Street scene, outskirts of Hiwassee

Hiwassee is a census-designated place (CDP) in Pulaski County, Virginia, United States. As of the 2020 census, Hiwassee had a population of 212.

== Demographics ==
Historical population
Census	Pop.	Note	%±
2020	212		—
U.S. Decennial Census; 2010 2020

Hiwassee was first listed as a census designated place in the 2010 U.S. census.
