= New River Valley Airport =

- IATA: PSK; ICAO: KPSK; FAA LID: PSK

Summary
- Airport type: Public
- Owner: New River Valley Airport Commission
- Serves: New River Valley
- Location: Dublin, Virginia
- Elevation AMSL: 2,105 ft / 642 m
- Coordinates: 37°08′14″N 080°40′43″W
- Interactive map of New River Valley Airport

Runways
Direction	Length		Surface
Direction	ft	m	Surface
6/24	6,201	1,890	Asphalt

Statistics (2006)
- Aircraft operations: 10,044
- Based aircraft: 34
- Source: Federal Aviation Administration

New River Valley Airport (IATA: PSK, ICAO: KPSK, FAA LID: PSK) is two miles north of Dublin, in Pulaski County, Virginia. It is owned by the New River Valley Airport Commission.

The facility serves general aviation. It is a U.S. Customs and Border Protection port of entry, as of 2024.

The airport was dedicated on June 3, 1962, and Piedmont Airlines was a founding user; their last YS-11 left in 1972.

== Facilities ==
New River Valley Airport covers 469 acres (190 ha) at an elevation of 2,105 feet (642 m). Its single runway, 6/24, is 6,201 by 150 feet (1,890 x 46 m) asphalt.

In the year ending July 31, 2006 the airport had 10,044 aircraft operations, average 27 per day: 62% general aviation and 38% military. 34 aircraft were then based at the airport: 78% single-engine, 19% multi-engine and 3% helicopter.
