= St. John's Episcopal Church (Wytheville, Virginia) =

Historic church in Virginia, United States

- U.S. National Register of Historic Places
- Virginia Landmarks Register
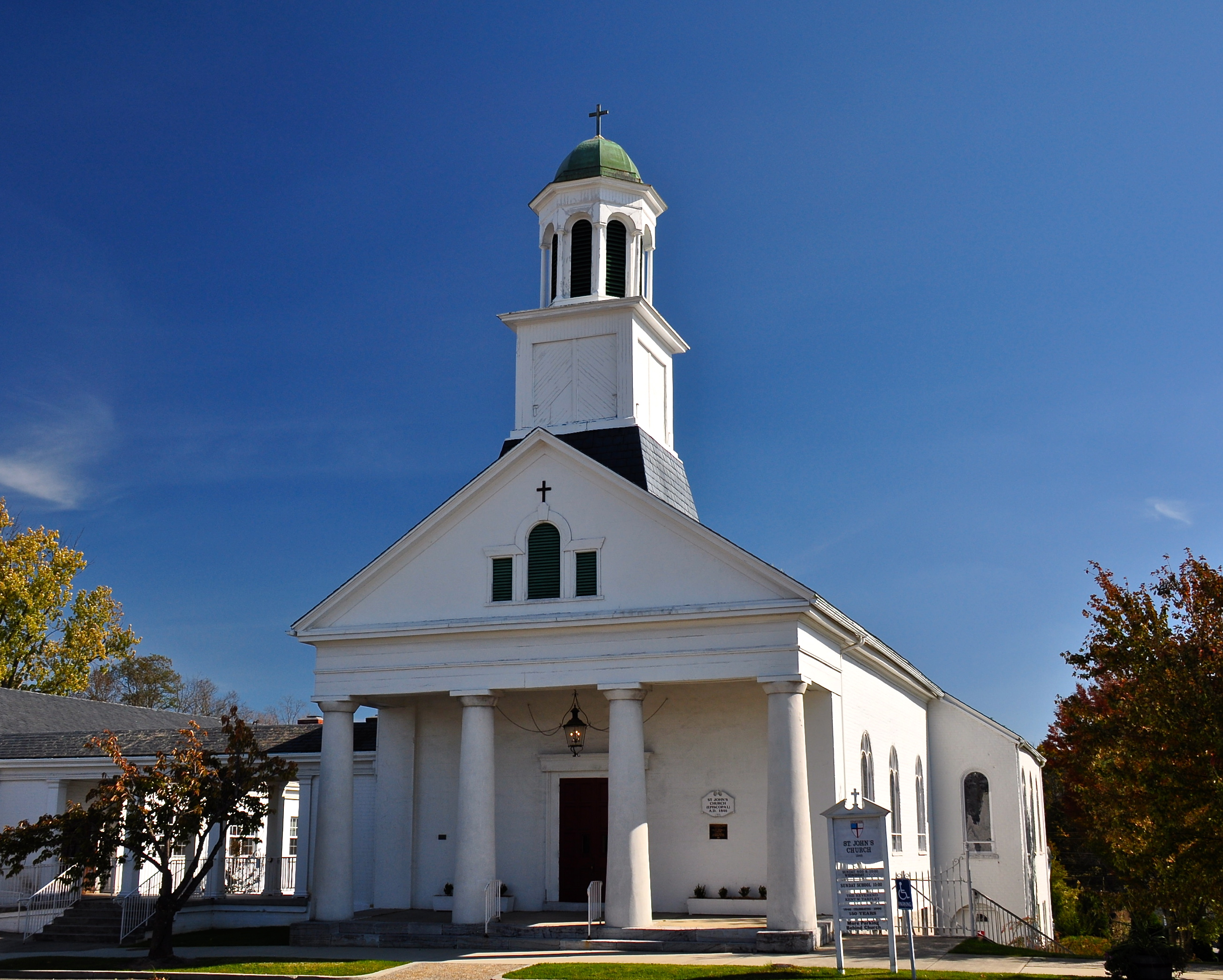
- St. John's Episcopal Church in October 2013.

- Location within Virginia Location within the United States
- Location: 275 E. Main St., Wytheville, Virginia
- Coordinates: 36°57′02″N 81°4′55″W
- Area: 1.1 acres (0.45 ha)
- Built: 1854-1857
- Architect: Lynch, M; et al.
- Architectural style: Classical Revival
- NRHP reference No.: 08000894
- VLR No.: 139-0008

Significant dates
- Added to NRHP: September 9, 2008
- Designated VLR: June 19, 2008

St. John's Episcopal Church is a historic Episcopal church in Wytheville, Virginia, United States. The church was built between 1854 and 1857, and is a Classical Revival style brick church building on a limestone foundation. The front facade features a pedimented portico with a full entablature supported by four monumental Doric order columns of parged brick. Atop the slate roof is an octagonal cupola with arcaded belfry. Attached to the church is a two-story, brick parish hall constructed in 1907, and a large, two-story office wing constructed in 1954.

It was listed on the National Register of Historic Places in 2008.
