= Tinytown, Virginia =

- Unincorporated community
- Location within Virginia Location within the United States
- Coordinates: 36°58′55″N 80°41′47″W
- Country: United States
- State: Virginia
- County: Pulaski
- Elevation: 2,100 ft (640 m)
- Time zone: UTC−5 (Eastern (EST))
  - Summer (DST): UTC−4 (EDT)
- Area code: 540
- GNIS feature ID: 1475737

Tinytown is an unincorporated community in Pulaski County, Virginia, United States.
