= Pulaski, Virginia =

Town of Pulaski, Virginia
- Town
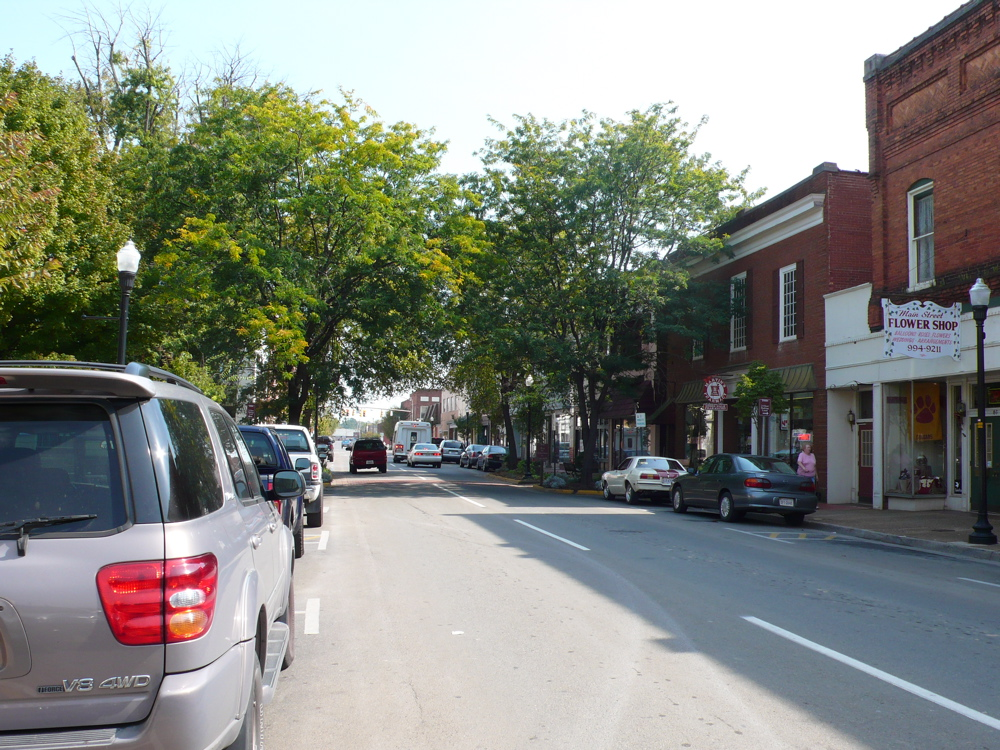
- Main Street in Pulaski, Virginia

- Location within Shenandoah Valley Location within Virginia Location within the United States
- Coordinates: 37°3′0″N 80°46′20″W
- Country: United States
- State: Virginia
- County: Pulaski

Government
  - Mayor: Shannon Collins

Area
  - Total: 8.12 sq mi (21.03 km^{2})
  - Land: 8.07 sq mi (20.90 km^{2})
  - Water: 0.054 sq mi (0.14 km^{2})
- Elevation: 1,903 ft (580 m)

Population (2020)
  - Total: 8,985
  - Estimate (2019): 8,714
  - Density: 1,079.9/sq mi (416.96/km^{2})
- Time zone: UTC−5 (EST)
  - Summer (DST): UTC−4 (EDT)
- ZIP code: 24301
- Area code: 540
- FIPS code: 51-64880
- GNIS feature ID: 1499922
- Website: http://www.pulaskitown.org/

Pulaski is a town in Pulaski County, Virginia, United States. As of the 2020 census, Pulaski had a population of 8,985. It is the county seat of Pulaski County.

Pulaski is part of the Blacksburg-Christiansburg metropolitan area.

== History ==
Pulaski was incorporated as a town in 1886. The town was named for Count Casimir Pulaski, a Revolutionary War hero from Poland.

On April 8, 2011, two tornadoes hit Pulaski, which destroyed 31 buildings and damaged 77 others. The tornadoes caused an estimated $1.68 million in damage.

=== Historic sites ===
Calfee Athletic Field, Dalton Theatre Building, Pulaski County Courthouse, Pulaski Historic Commercial District, Pulaski Historic Residential District, and Pulaski South Historic Residential and Industrial District are listed on the National Register of Historic Places.

== Geography ==
Pulaski is located at 37°03′00″N 80°46′20″W (37.050094, −80.772193).

According to the United States Census Bureau, the town has a total area of 7.8 square miles (20.21 km^{2}), all land.

=== Climate ===
Climate data for Pulaski, Virginia (1991–2020 normals, extremes 1920–present)
Month	Jan	Feb	Mar	Apr	May	Jun	Jul	Aug	Sep	Oct	Nov	Dec	Year
Record high °F (°C)	73 (23)	79 (26)	85 (29)	91 (33)	96 (36)	99 (37)	99 (37)	98 (37)	95 (35)	92 (33)	80 (27)	74 (23)	99 (37)
Mean daily maximum °F (°C)	42.8 (6.0)	46.1 (7.8)	53.8 (12.1)	64.6 (18.1)	72.5 (22.5)	79.4 (26.3)	82.8 (28.2)	81.5 (27.5)	75.9 (24.4)	66.2 (19.0)	55.4 (13.0)	45.9 (7.7)	63.9 (17.7)
Daily mean °F (°C)	33.2 (0.7)	35.8 (2.1)	42.6 (5.9)	52.3 (11.3)	60.7 (15.9)	68.3 (20.2)	72.0 (22.2)	70.6 (21.4)	64.5 (18.1)	53.8 (12.1)	43.7 (6.5)	36.1 (2.3)	52.8 (11.6)
Mean daily minimum °F (°C)	23.6 (−4.7)	25.6 (−3.6)	31.3 (−0.4)	39.9 (4.4)	49.0 (9.4)	57.3 (14.1)	61.2 (16.2)	59.7 (15.4)	53.1 (11.7)	41.4 (5.2)	32.0 (0.0)	26.4 (−3.1)	41.7 (5.4)
Record low °F (°C)	−16 (−27)	−13 (−25)	0 (−18)	12 (−11)	25 (−4)	32 (0)	39 (4)	33 (1)	28 (−2)	14 (−10)	3 (−16)	−12 (−24)	−16 (−27)
Average precipitation inches (mm)	3.18 (81)	2.67 (68)	3.56 (90)	3.59 (91)	3.99 (101)	3.96 (101)	3.83 (97)	3.51 (89)	3.22 (82)	2.85 (72)	2.47 (63)	3.17 (81)	40.00 (1,016)
Average snowfall inches (cm)	4.7 (12)	4.6 (12)	2.3 (5.8)	0.6 (1.5)	0.0 (0.0)	0.0 (0.0)	0.0 (0.0)	0.0 (0.0)	0.0 (0.0)	0.0 (0.0)	0.1 (0.25)	3.5 (8.9)	15.8 (40)
Average precipitation days (≥ 0.01 in)	9.2	8.8	10.4	11.2	12.5	11.9	12.7	11.2	9.5	8.6	7.8	9.2	123.0
Average snowy days (≥ 0.1 in)	2.4	2.5	1.4	0.3	0.0	0.0	0.0	0.0	0.0	0.0	0.2	1.7	8.5
Source: NOAA

== Demographics ==
Historical population
Census	Pop.	Note	%±
1890	2,112		—
1900	2,813		33.2%
1910	4,807		70.9%
1920	5,282		9.9%
1930	7,168		35.7%
1940	8,792		22.7%
1950	9,202		4.7%
1960	10,469		13.8%
1970	10,279		−1.8%
1980	10,106		−1.7%
1990	9,985		−1.2%
2000	9,473		−5.1%
2010	9,086		−4.1%
2020	8,985		−1.1%
U.S. Decennial Census

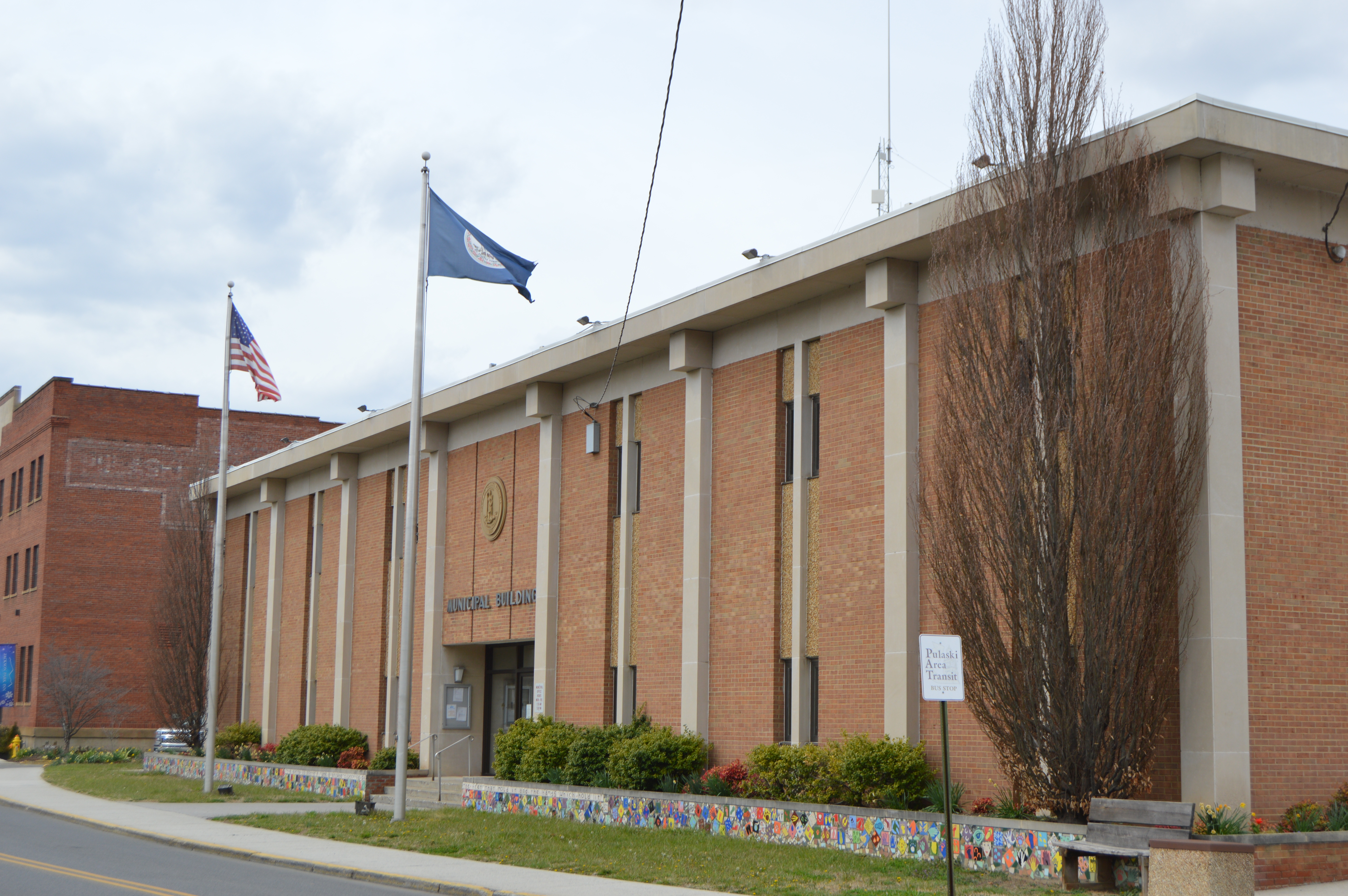
Pulaski Town Hall

As of the census of 2000, there were 9,473 people, 4,173 households, and 2,670 families living in the town. The population density was 1,211.2 people per square mile (467.7/km^{2}). There were 4,517 housing units at an average density of 577.6 per square mile (223.0/km^{2}). The racial makeup of the town was 89.55% White, 7.75% African American, 0.12% Native American, 0.36% Asian, 0.08% Pacific Islander, 0.96% from other races, and 1.18% from two or more races. Hispanic or Latino of any race were 2.02% of the population.

There were 4,173 households, out of which 25.9% had children under the age of 18 living with them, 45.8% were married couples living together, 14.0% had a female householder with no husband present, and 36.0% were non-families. 31.9% of all households were made up of individuals, and 15.4% had someone living alone who was 65 years of age or older. The average household size was 2.24 and the average family size was 2.80.

In the town, the population was spread out, with 21.7% under the age of 18, 7.7% from 18 to 24, 27.3% from 25 to 44, 25.0% from 45 to 64, and 18.3% who were 65 years of age or older. The median age was 40 years. For every 100 females, there were 87.8 males. For every 100 females age 18 and over, there were 83.4 males.

The median income for a household in the town was $25,481, and the median income for a family was $36,339. Males had a median income of $28,054 versus $20,177 for females. The per capita income for the town was $21,338. About 16.1% of families and 21.8% of the population were below the poverty line, including 30.7% of those under age 18 and 19.2% of those age 65 or over.

== Education ==
Pulaski County High School is Pulaski County's sole high school. The school is located in Dublin, Virginia and has around 1500 students. New River Community College is Pulaski County's closest school of higher learning within the county lines. New River Community College (NRCC) is a comprehensive community college located in the New River Valley of Virginia with the school physically located in Dublin, Virginia. Other significant institutions of higher learning located in the region are Wytheville Community College located in the nearby city of Wytheville, Virginia; Radford University, a four-year public, state-funded university located in Radford, Virginia and Virginia Tech, which is a public land grant polytechnic university in Blacksburg, Virginia.

== Recreation ==
The town was home to the Pulaski Yankees baseball club of the Appalachian League at Calfee Park. In 2021, the team became the Pulaski River Turtles.

The northern end of New River Trail State Park is in Pulaski. There are 6 miles of purpose built mountain bike trails on Draper Mountain, and access to rural and scenic roads for road biking.

Gatewood Park and Reservoir is 400 scenic acres nestled in the Blue Ridge Mountains of Southwest Virginia. The park is owned by The Town of Pulaski and is accessible from Interstates 81 and 77.

== Notable people ==
- Lewis Kenneth Bausell, Medal of Honor recipient
- Ed Goodson, baseball player
- Shayne Graham, NFL football player
- Jeff King, NFL football player
- Scott Mactavish, filmmaker and author
- Garnett Moore (1914–1984), lawyer and state delegate
- Temple Painter, American harpsichordist and organist
- Matokie Slaughter, clawhammer banjo player
