= Haller–Gibboney Rock House =

Historic house in Virginia, United States

- U.S. National Register of Historic Places
- Virginia Landmarks Register
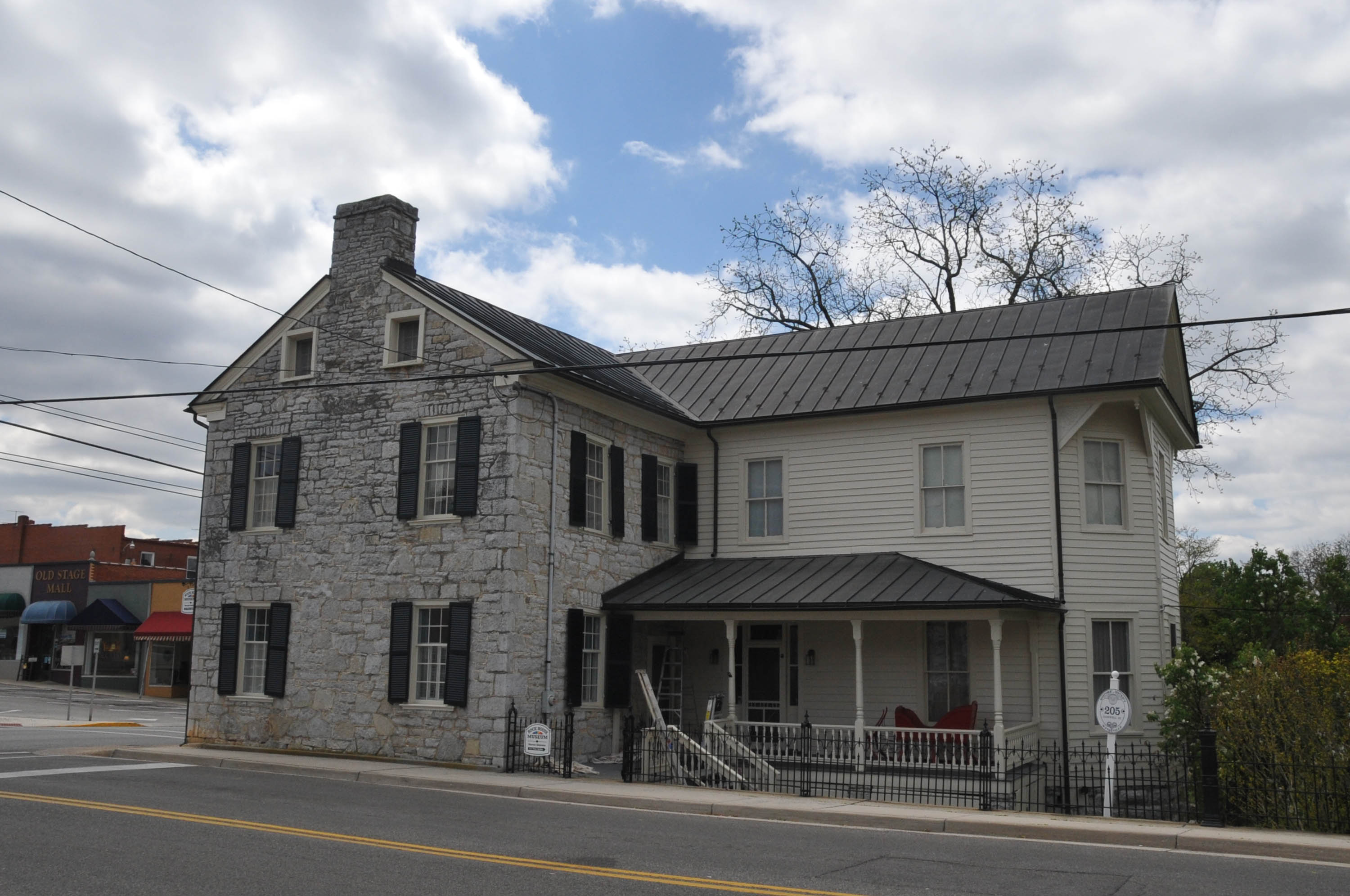
- Haller–Gibboney Rock House, April 2012

- Location within Virginia Location within the United States
- Location: 205 Tazewell Street, Wytheville, Virginia
- Coordinates: 36°57′2″N 81°5′4″W
- Area: 9.9 acres (4.0 ha)
- Built: 1822-1823
- Architectural style: Federal, Late Federal
- NRHP reference No.: 72001419
- VLR No.: 139-0006

Significant dates
- Added to NRHP: November 9, 1972
- Designated VLR: April 18, 1972

Haller–Gibboney Rock House is a historic home located at Wytheville, Wythe County, Virginia. It was built in 1822–1823, and is a two-story, five bay late Federal style limestone dwelling. It has a side gable roof and a two-story frame ell terminating in a demi-octagonal end. The Rock House was used as a hospital during the Battle of Wytheville during Civil War. The building houses a museum sponsored by the Wythe County Historical Society.

It was listed on the National Register of Historic Places in 1972.
