= McAdam, Virginia =

Unincorporated community in Virginia, US

Coordinates: 37°01′49″N 80°43′29″W

McAdam is an unincorporated community in Pulaski County, Virginia, United States.
