= Draper, Virginia =

Coordinates: 37°00′21″N 80°44′50″W

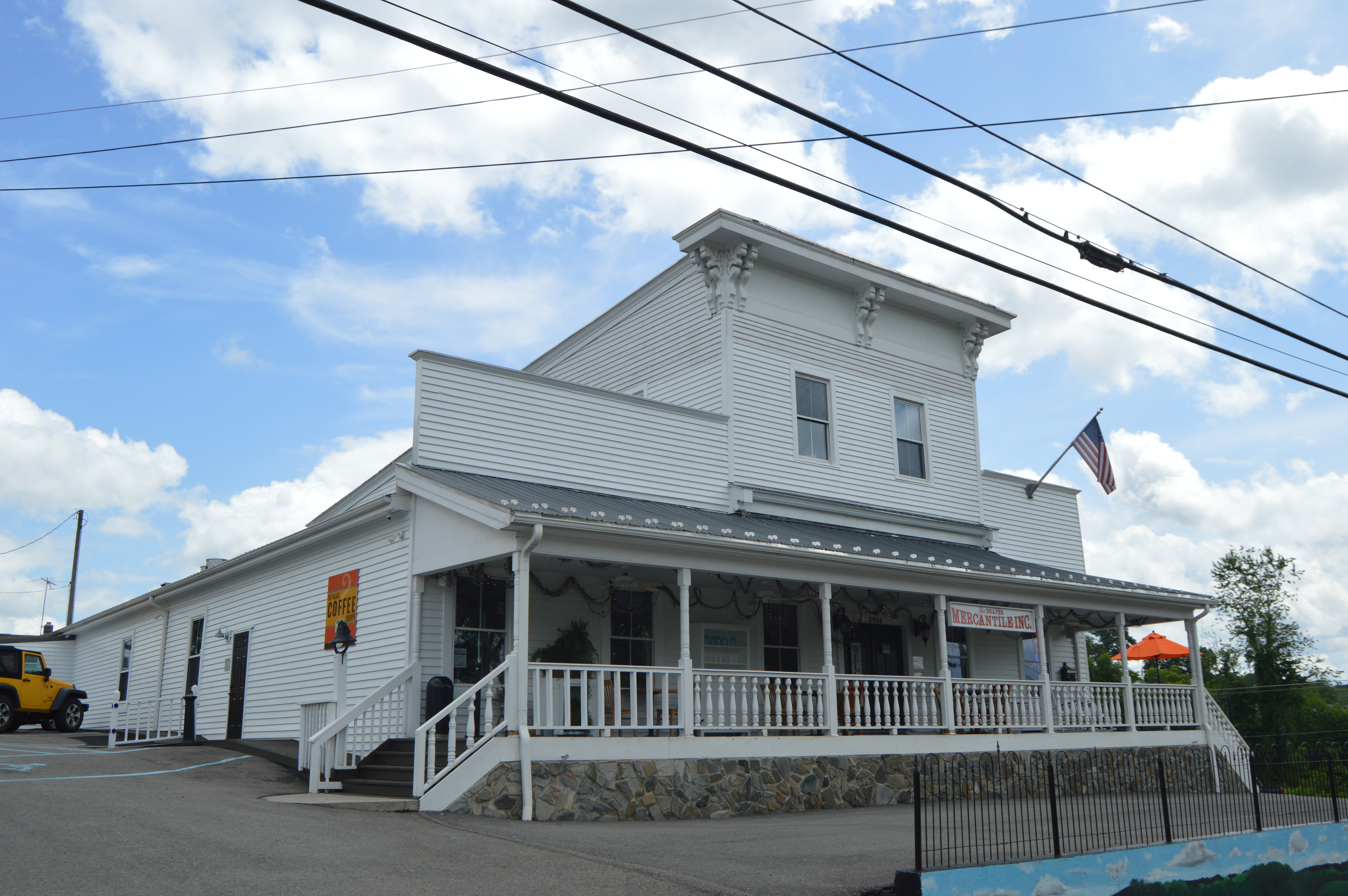
Draper Mercantile, a core part of Draper's historic district

Draper is a census-designated place (CDP) in Pulaski County, Virginia, United States. As of the 2020 census, Draper had a population of 291. Draper has both a fire station and post office. Draper developed around the Draper Depot of the Norfolk and Western Railway's Cripple Creek Extension in 1886. The bed of this extension now forms the New River Trail State Park.

Draper is home to the Draper Historic District, which includes 40 acres with a variety of contributing historic buildings, including the Draper Mercantile (1887), Bank of Draper (1911), and several houses in the Gothic Revival and Queen Anne styles.

The Draper Mercantile was purchased in 2008 and renovated into a restaurant, café, and retail store. The Draper Mercantile and surrounding Draper community are featured in tourism materials for Pulaski County.

== Demographics ==
Historical population
Census	Pop.	Note	%±
2010	320		—
2020	291		−9.1%
U.S. Decennial Census; 2010 2020

Draper was first listed as a census designated place in the 2010 U.S. census.
