= Wytheville, Virginia =

- Town
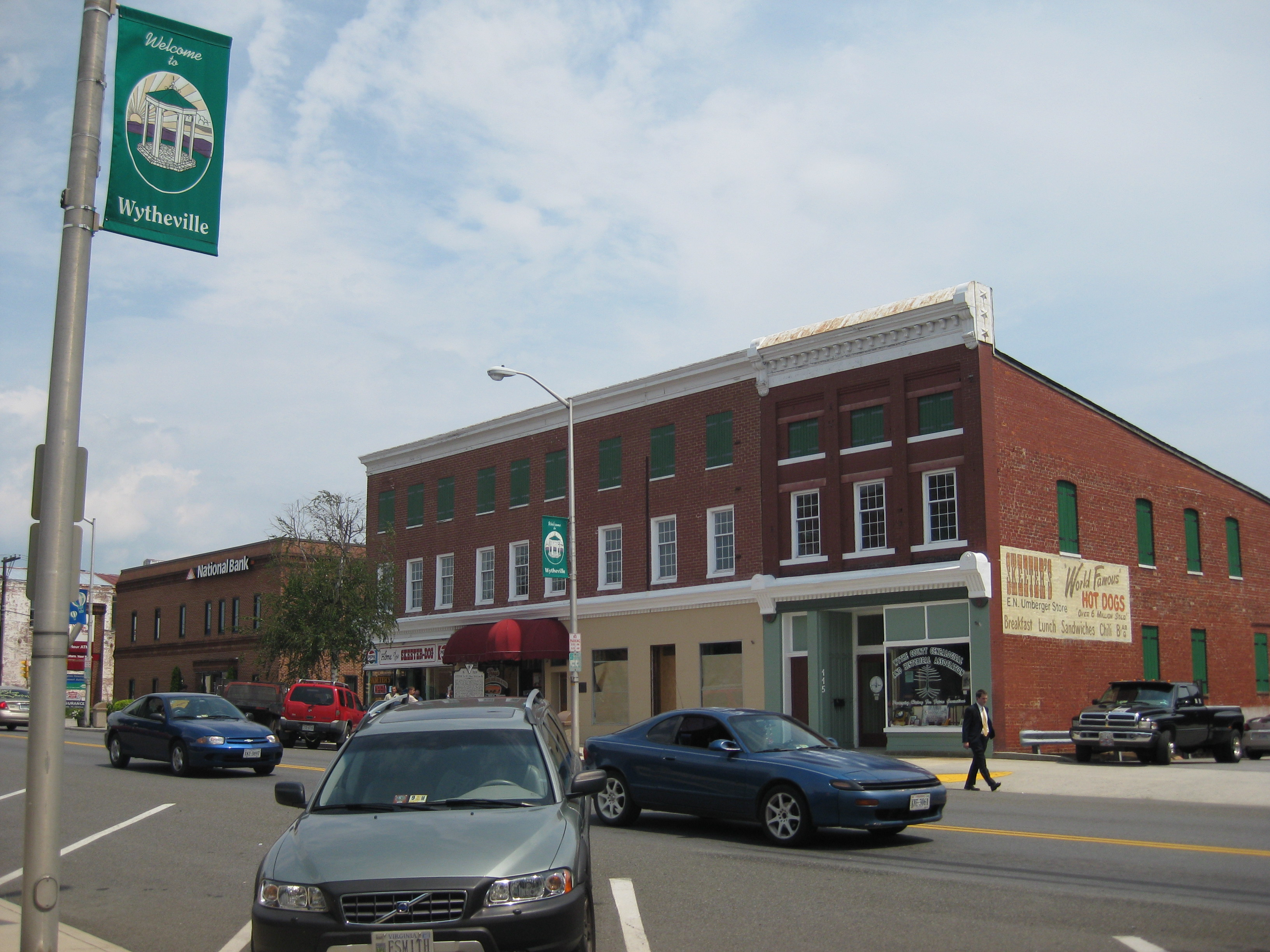
- Main Street in Wytheville

- Flag Seal

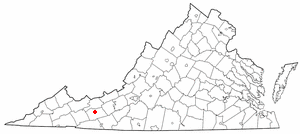
- Location in the Commonwealth of Virginia
- Coordinates: 36°56′52″N 81°05′13″W
- Country: United States
- State: Virginia
- County: Wythe

Government
  - Mayor: Beth A. Taylor

Area
  - Town: 14.58 sq mi (37.77 km^{2})
  - Land: 14.49 sq mi (37.53 km^{2})
  - Water: 0.093 sq mi (0.24 km^{2})
- Elevation: 2,287 ft (697 m)

Population (2020)
  - Town: 8,265
  - Estimate (2022): 8,177
  - Density: 546.7/sq mi (211.07/km^{2})
  - Metro: 28,290
- U.S. Census Bureau, 2020 Census
- Time zone: UTC−5 (EST)
  - Summer (DST): UTC−4 (EDT)
- ZIP code: 24382
- Area code: 276
- FIPS code: 51-88000
- GNIS feature ID: 1498537
- Website: wytheville.org

Wytheville (/ˈwɪθvɪl/ WITH-vil) is a town in and the county seat of Wythe County, Virginia, United States. It is named after George Wythe, a signer of the United States Declaration of Independence and mentor to Thomas Jefferson. Wytheville's population was 8,265 at the 2020 census. Interstate Highways 77 and 81 were constructed to intersect at the town.

During the American Civil War, Wytheville had a strategic importance. It was attacked in 1863 (Toland's Raid) and 1865 (Stoneman's 1865 Raid). The town is the birthplace of Edith Bolling Wilson, second wife of President Woodrow Wilson.

== History ==
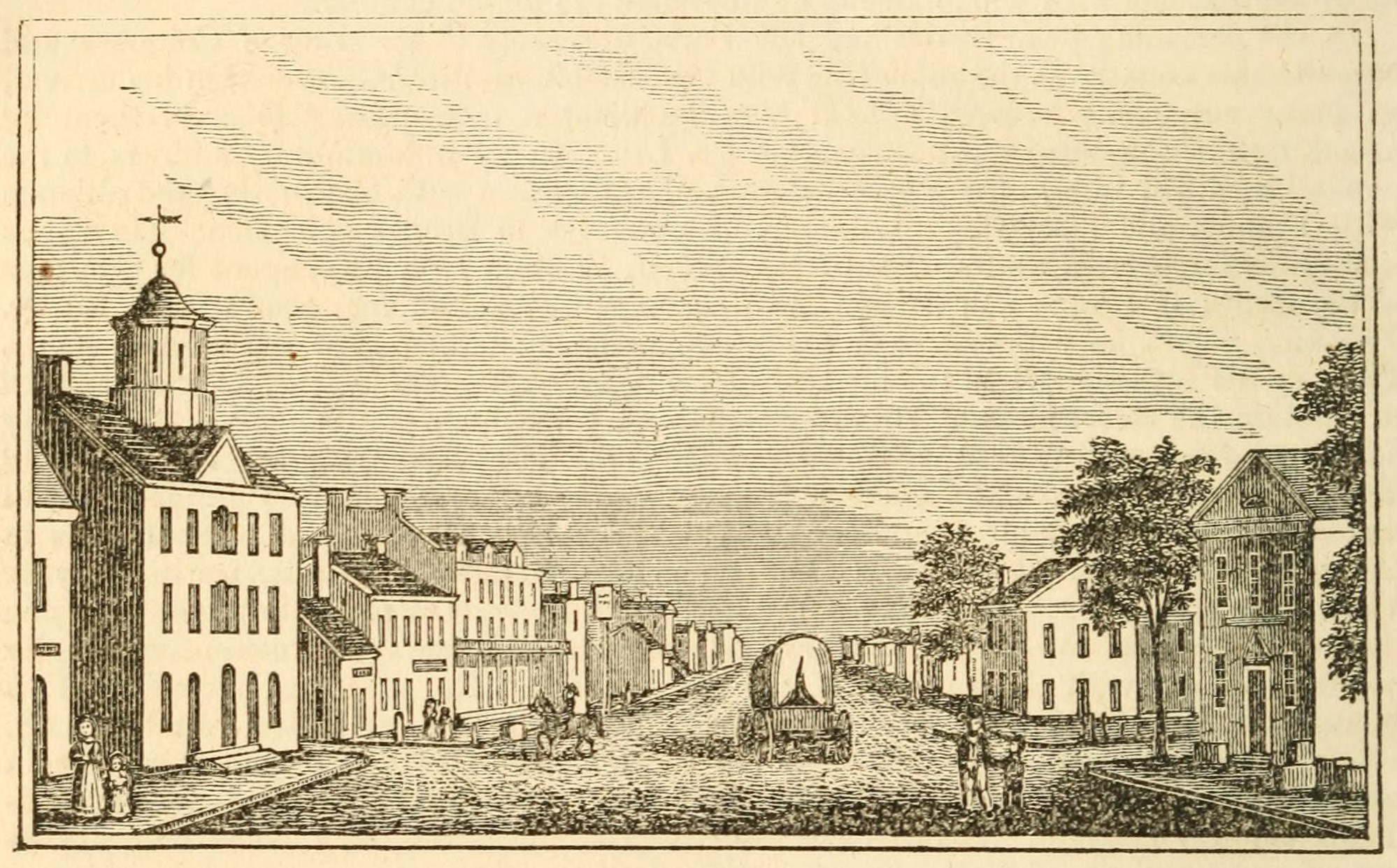
Wytheville c. 1845

Wythe County was created in 1789 and named for George Wythe, the "father of American Jurisprudence" and signer of the Declaration of Independence. In May 1790, Chris Simmerman donated 85 acres, Robert Williams II donated 50 acres, and John Davis donated 10 acres to establish a town and county seat. Robert Adams completed a town survey in November of that year, dividing the area into half-acre lots. The town did not have an official name yet, but was generally known as Wythe Court House.

Two years later, in October 1792, the town was officially named Evansham, for prominent local citizen Jesse Evans. After a disastrous fire in March 1839, the town was renamed Wytheville. At that time, it was home to about 500 residents.

=== Lynching of Raymond Byrd ===
In 1926, the last documented lynching in Virginia took place here, when Raymond Byrd, an African-American man, was murdered by a large group of masked and costumed men while under arrest in the local jail. Byrd was accused of raping or assaulting the three white daughters of Grover Grubb, his employer. The two older sisters, both of whom bore Byrd's children, were of age and revealed that the relationship was consensual and thus did not constitute a crime. He was, however, eventually arrested on the accusation that he assaulted the minor daughter. Byrd was shot and killed by the mob while he was in his jail cell. Then his dead body was dragged a few miles behind a truck, placed in the boot of a car, and then hanged from a tree on Charley Brown's land near St. Paul Lutheran Church. The event provoked outrage and national coverage by newspapers.

Byrd's death was a catalyst for Virginia's passing an anti-lynching law in 1928, largely because of a campaign led by Louis I. Jaffé, editor of the Norfolk Virginian-Pilot. It was supported by Governor Harry Flood Byrd Sr., who linked the bill to his efforts to attract new businesses to the state.

=== Polio epidemic ===
A few cases of polio during the summer of 1950 swelled into an epidemic of hundreds. It was known to cause infantile and even adult paralysis. Of the 5,513 inhabitants of the town, 184 people contracted the disease, resulting in 17 fatalities. From the beginning of June until the end of August, parents kept children inside, and large gatherings were cancelled to diminish the chance of infection.

As the epidemic progressed, ambulances drove victims approximately 80 miles (130 km) to Memorial Crippled Children's Hospital in Roanoke, Virginia. Hearses from local funeral homes were used when ambulances were unavailable. African-American patients with polio were repeatedly denied admission to Roanoke's hospital and were forced to drive approximately 180 miles (290 km) to St. Philip's Hospital in Richmond, the closest hospital to serve blacks.

The Town Council erected billboards at all five entrances to the county, warning potential visitors of the epidemic and urging tourists to return the following year. By the end of the summer, all five billboards were stolen or demolished. Though the Town Council offered a reward for information, no one came forward.

=== Historic sites ===
The Crockett's Cove Presbyterian Church, Haller-Gibboney Rock House, Loretto, St. John's Episcopal Church, St. John's Lutheran Church and Cemetery, Wythe County Poorhouse Farm, and Wytheville Historic District are listed on the National Register of Historic Places.

== Geography ==
Wytheville is located at 36°56′52″N 81°5′13″W (36.947679, −81.086955).

According to the United States Census Bureau, the town has a total area of 14.3 sq mi (37.0 km^{2}), of which 0.04 sq mi (0.1 km^{2}) (0.14%) is water.

Wytheville is an important point on both I-77 and I-81 and lies amidst a wrong-way concurrency of I-77 and I-81. It is located about halfway between Bristol, Tennessee/Virginia and Roanoke. On the I-77 corridor, it is located about halfway between Charleston, West Virginia and Charlotte, North Carolina. The nearby community of Fort Chiswell is the control city for the northbound traffic on I-77 coming from Charlotte, Statesville, Elkin, and Mount Airy, North Carolina.

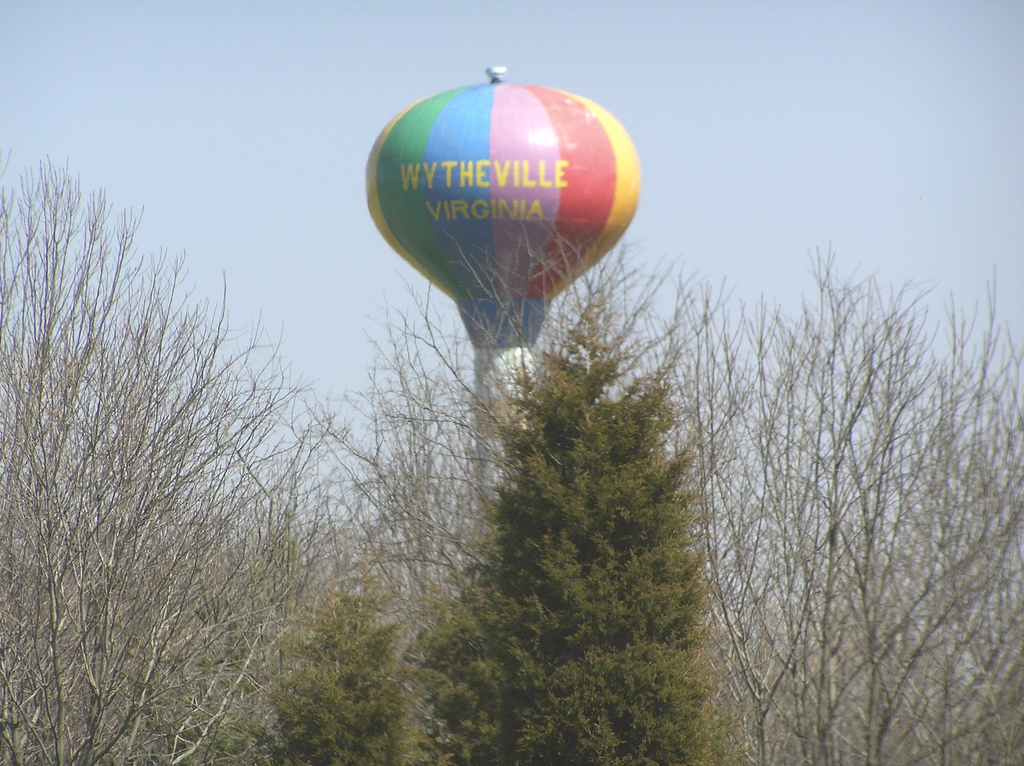
Wytheville's hot air balloon-themed water tower, inspired by the town's yearly Chautauqua Festival balloon launches, can be seen by I-81 travellers near the I-77 interchange.

Due to the confluence of I-77, I-81, and several U.S. Highways and its location in the foothills of the Blue Ridge Mountains, Wytheville is known as "The Hub of Southwest Virginia" and "The Crossroads of the Blue Ridge".

=== Climate ===
Due to its elevation, the climate of Wytheville is either classified as mountain temperate or humid subtropical (Köppen Cfb or Cfa, respectively), and the town straddles the border between USDA Plant Hardiness Zones 6B and 7A. Summers are warm and humid, although significantly cooler than low-elevation places within the state, with only 4.6 days of 90 °F (32 °C)+ highs annually, and winters are generally cool to cold, with occasional intervening warm periods and 11 nights of sub-10 °F (−12 °C) lows. Monthly mean temperatures range from 32.9 °F (0.5 °C) in January to 71.7 °F (22.1 °C) in July. Snowfall averages 20.5 inches (52 cm) per season and generally occurs from December to March.

Climate data for Wytheville, Virginia, elev. 2,458 feet (749 m) (1991–2020 normals, extremes 1893–present)
Month	Jan	Feb	Mar	Apr	May	Jun	Jul	Aug	Sep	Oct	Nov	Dec	Year
Record high °F (°C)	78 (26)	78 (26)	83 (28)	88 (31)	91 (33)	98 (37)	98 (37)	98 (37)	97 (36)	90 (32)	80 (27)	76 (24)	98 (37)
Mean daily maximum °F (°C)	42.2 (5.7)	45.9 (7.7)	54.0 (12.2)	64.5 (18.1)	72.5 (22.5)	79.3 (26.3)	82.8 (28.2)	81.8 (27.7)	76.5 (24.7)	66.6 (19.2)	55.5 (13.1)	45.8 (7.7)	63.9 (17.7)
Daily mean °F (°C)	32.9 (0.5)	35.7 (2.1)	42.6 (5.9)	51.9 (11.1)	60.5 (15.8)	68.0 (20.0)	71.7 (22.1)	70.6 (21.4)	64.6 (18.1)	53.7 (12.1)	43.2 (6.2)	36.2 (2.3)	52.6 (11.4)
Mean daily minimum °F (°C)	23.5 (−4.7)	25.6 (−3.6)	31.2 (−0.4)	39.2 (4.0)	48.5 (9.2)	56.7 (13.7)	60.6 (15.9)	59.5 (15.3)	52.8 (11.6)	40.7 (4.8)	31.0 (−0.6)	26.6 (−3.0)	41.3 (5.2)
Record low °F (°C)	−20 (−29)	−9 (−23)	0 (−18)	12 (−11)	23 (−5)	30 (−1)	39 (4)	35 (2)	25 (−4)	12 (−11)	2 (−17)	−13 (−25)	−20 (−29)
Average precipitation inches (mm)	3.16 (80)	2.88 (73)	3.60 (91)	3.75 (95)	4.30 (109)	4.06 (103)	4.22 (107)	3.63 (92)	3.36 (85)	2.92 (74)	2.62 (67)	3.18 (81)	41.68 (1,059)
Average snowfall inches (cm)	5.9 (15)	4.9 (12)	2.9 (7.4)	0.5 (1.3)	0.0 (0.0)	0.0 (0.0)	0.0 (0.0)	0.0 (0.0)	0.0 (0.0)	0.0 (0.0)	0.4 (1.0)	3.8 (9.7)	18.4 (47)
Average precipitation days (≥ 0.01 in)	11.1	10.8	11.9	12.0	13.5	12.8	12.4	11.1	9.9	9.0	9.2	11.3	135.0
Average snowy days (≥ 0.1 in)	2.8	2.5	1.5	0.3	0.0	0.0	0.0	0.0	0.0	0.0	0.4	2.1	9.6
Source: NOAA

== Demographics ==
Historical population
Census	Pop.	Note	%±
1860	1,111		—
1870	1,671		50.4%
1880	1,885		12.8%
1890	2,570		36.3%
1900	3,003		16.8%
1910	3,054		1.7%
1920	2,947		−3.5%
1930	3,327		12.9%
1940	4,653		39.9%
1950	5,513		18.5%
1960	5,634		2.2%
1970	6,069		7.7%
1980	7,135		17.6%
1990	8,038		12.7%
2000	7,804		−2.9%
2010	8,211		5.2%
2020	8,265		0.7%
2022 (est.)	8,177		−1.1%
U.S. Decennial Census

As of the 2020 census, there were 8,264 people, residing in the town. The population density was 570.4 people per square mile (211.07/km^{2}). The racial makeup of the town was 86.3% White (85.9% non-Hispanic white), 6.7% Black or African American (6.6% non-Hispanic black), 0.4% Native American, 1.1% Asian, 0.01% Pacific Islander, 1.1% from other races, and 4.5% from two or more races. Hispanic or Latino of any race were 2.3% of the population.

There were 4,299 housing units at an average density of 296.7 units per square mile (113.8/km^{2}), containing 3,922 households. There were 2,102 (53.6%) family households. 22.7% of households had children under the age of 18 living with them, 35.1% were married couples living together, 6.3% were cohabitating couples living together, 38% had a female householder with no partner present, and 20.% had a male householder with no partner present. 40.8% of all households consisted of single individuals living alone. The average household size was 2.1 and the average family size was 2.9.

In total 19.5% of the population was under the age of 18 and 25.3% were 65 years of age or older. The median age was 45.2 years. For every 100 females, there were 87 males.

In the period of 2018–2022, the Census Bureau estimated that the median household income was $39,459, while the mean income was $66,606. For family households, the median income was $75,964 while the mean income was $95,921. The per capita income for the town was $33,813. 27.3% of the population were below the poverty line, including 39.7% of those under age 18 and 13.7% of those age 65 or over.

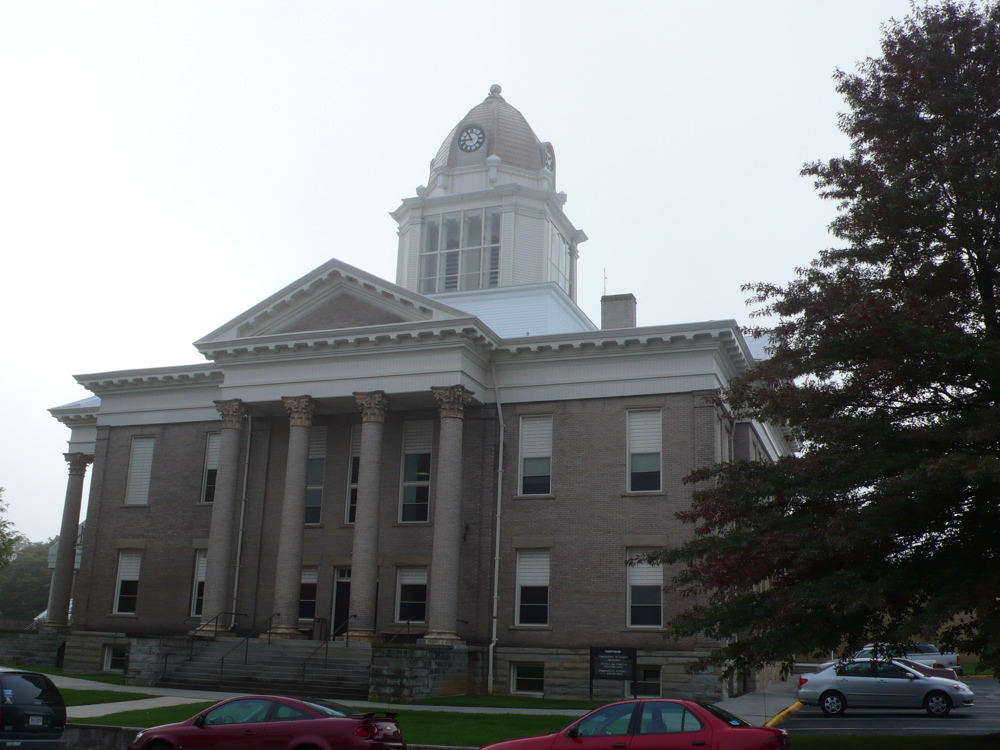
The courthouse in Wytheville, Virginia.

== Media ==
WYVE 1280 on the AM dial signed on in 1949. In August 2018, WYVE acquired FM translator dial position 99.9 FM. Blue Ridge Media Partners owns WYVE and its sister stations WXBX and WLOY, with towers in Wythe County and studio space adjacent to downtown Wytheville. Wytheville is also served by the newspapers the Wytheville Enterprise and the SWVA Sun.

== Places of interest ==
- Hitachi Energy Arena, a 3,600-seat arena home to the Blue Ridge Bobcats of the Federal Prospects Hockey League.
- The Edith Bolling Wilson Birthplace
- Big Walker Lookout Tower, a 100-foot observation tower located 12 miles to the north of Wytheville
- The town is home to the Chautauqua Festival, held the third weekend in June every year since 1985. The festival features live concerts, stage magic, arts and crafts, hot air ballooning, dance, children's activities, and diverse carnival-style food. The presence of the hot air balloons for the yearly festival inspired the balloon-themed painting of the town's water tower, visible to I-81 travellers near the I-77 interchange. The festival is held at Elizabeth Brown Memorial Park and is co-sponsored by the county, town, and the Wythe Arts Council.

== Notable people ==
- David French Boyd, president of LSU, 1877–1880; 1884–1886, born in Wytheville in 1834
- William Gibson, writer, spent much of his childhood there
- William Nauns Ricks, poet
- E. Lee Trinkle, Governor of Virginia
- James Walker, Lt. Governor of Virginia; Confederate General
- Edith Wilson, second wife of President Woodrow Wilson
- Robert E. Withers, former U.S. Senator, Lt. Governor of Virginia, first American Ambassador to China
