= Pulaski County, Virginia =

County in Virginia, United States

- County
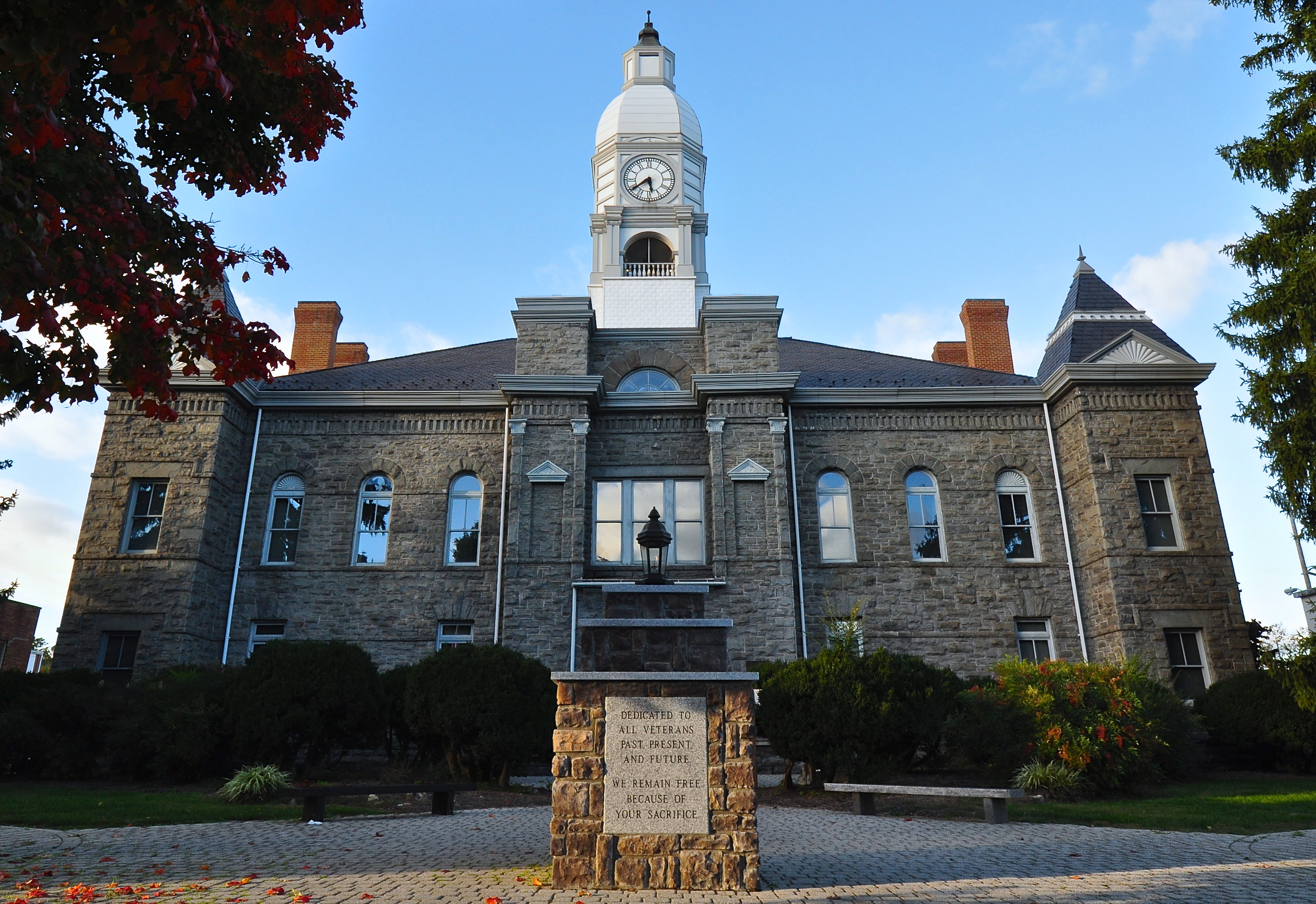
- Pulaski County Courthouse

- Seal

- Location within the U.S. state of Virginia
- Coordinates: 37°04′N 80°43′W
- Country: United States
- State: Virginia
- Founded: 1839
- Named for: Casimir Pulaski
- Seat: Pulaski
- Largest town: Pulaski

Area
  - Total: 330 sq mi (850 km^{2})
  - Land: 320 sq mi (830 km^{2})
  - Water: 10 sq mi (26 km^{2}) 3.0%

Population (2020)
  - Total: 33,800
  - Estimate (2025): 33,586 ▼
  - Density: 100/sq mi (39/km^{2})
- Time zone: UTC−5 (Eastern)
  - Summer (DST): UTC−4 (EDT)
- Congressional district: 9th
- Website: www.pulaskicounty.org

Pulaski County is a county located in the southwestern part of the U.S. state of Virginia. As of the 2020 census, the population was 33,800. Its county seat is Pulaski. Pulaski County is part of the Blacksburg-Christiansburg metropolitan area.

== History ==
Pulaski County was formed on March 30, 1839, from parts of Montgomery and Wythe counties, becoming the 87th county of the Commonwealth of Virginia. It was named for Count Casimir Pulaski, an exiled Polish nobleman who fought during the American Revolution as part of George Washington's army. He joined the army in 1777 and became a brigadier general and chief of cavalry in the Continental Army. He was fatally wounded at Savannah and died on October 11, 1779.

This area of the Blue Ridge has rolling hills and was settled by mostly small farmers, recent Scots-Irish and German immigrants and their descendants who migrated down the Shenandoah Valley from Pennsylvania in the mid to late-18th century. They pushed out or killed most Native Americans in the area. The new settlers were yeomen, who held fewer slaves than in the Tidewater area. Nonetheless, by the 1840 census, slaves comprised about one-quarter of the population. The county had 3,739 residents: 2,768 free whites and 971 blacks, including 17 free blacks.

== Geography ==
According to the U.S. Census Bureau, the county has a total area of 330 square miles (850 km^{2}), of which 320 square miles (830 km^{2}) is land and 10 square miles (26 km^{2}) (3.0%) is water. Pulaski County is one of the 423 counties served by the Appalachian Regional Commission, and it is identified as part of "Greater Appalachia" by Colin Woodard in his book American Nations: A History of the Eleven Rival Regional Cultures of North America.

Pulaski County is the site of Claytor Lake State Park, which is located on Claytor Lake, a 4,500-acre (18 km^{2}), 21-mile (34 km) long human-made lake on the New River created for a hydroelectric project of Appalachian Power Company. Claytor Lake State Park, located on the north side of the lake, provides 497 acres of park with camping, cabins, picnic areas, and a swimming beach, as well as a marina. It is named for W. Graham Claytor, Sr. (1886–1971) of Roanoke, Virginia, a vice president of Appalachian Power who supervised construction of the dam and creation of the lake.

Pulaski County has several public boating sites including Harry DeHaven Park, in Allisonia on Rt.639, in Dublin on Rt. 660, and Gatewood Reservoir, a 162-acre water supply impoundment owned by the Town of Pulaski.

=== Adjacent counties / Independent city ===
- Bland County – northwest
- Giles County – north
- Montgomery County – northeast
- City of Radford – northeast
- Floyd County – southeast
- Carroll County – south
- Wythe County – southwest

Law Enforcement

Pulaski County Sheriff is Michael W. Worrell, a law enforcement veteran with twenty plus years of service to the citizens of Pulaski County. He is a graduate of Pulaski County High School and Radford University.

=== National protected area ===
- Jefferson National Forest (part)

=== Major highways ===
- I-81
- US 11
- SR 99
- SR 100
- SR 114
- SR 9

== Demographics ==
Historical population
Census	Pop.	Note	%±
1840	3,739		—
1850	5,118		36.9%
1860	5,416		5.8%
1870	6,538		20.7%
1880	8,755		33.9%
1890	12,790		46.1%
1900	14,609		14.2%
1910	17,246		18.1%
1920	17,111		−0.8%
1930	20,566		20.2%
1940	22,767		10.7%
1950	27,758		21.9%
1960	27,258		−1.8%
1970	29,564		8.5%
1980	35,229		19.2%
1990	34,496		−2.1%
2000	35,127		1.8%
2010	34,872		−0.7%
2020	33,800		−3.1%
2025 (est.)	33,586	▼	−0.6%
U.S. Decennial Census; 1790–1960 1900–1990; 1990–2000 2010 2020

=== Racial and ethnic composition ===
Pulaski County, Virginia – Racial and ethnic composition Note: the US Census treats Hispanic/Latino as an ethnic category. This table excludes Latinos from the racial categories and assigns them to a separate category. Hispanics/Latinos may be of any race.
Race / Ethnicity (NH = Non-Hispanic)	Pop 1980	Pop 1990	Pop 2000	Pop 2010	Pop 2020	% 1980	% 1990	% 2000	% 2010	% 2020
White alone (NH)	33,064	32,228	32,351	31,972	29,716	93.85%	93.43%	92.10%	91.68%	87.92%
Black or African American alone (NH)	1,843	1,991	1,947	1,744	1,633	5.23%	5.77%	5.54%	5.00%	4.83%
Native American or Alaska Native alone (NH)	53	40	45	61	49	0.15%	0.12%	0.13%	0.17%	0.14%
Asian alone (NH)	64	78	114	179	177	0.18%	0.23%	0.32%	0.51%	0.52%
Native Hawaiian or Pacific Islander alone (NH)	x	x	4	7	3	x	x	0.01%	0.02%	0.01%
Other race alone (NH)	23	5	15	25	100	0.07%	0.01%	0.04%	0.07%	0.30%
Mixed race or Multiracial (NH)	x	x	315	452	1,418	x	x	0.90%	1.30%	4.20%
Hispanic or Latino (any race)	182	154	336	432	704	0.52%	0.45%	0.96%	1.24%	2.08%
Total	35,229	34,496	35,127	34,872	33,800	100.00%	100.00%	100.00%	100.00%	100.00%

=== 2020 census ===
As of the 2020 census, the county had a population of 33,800. The median age was 46.9 years. 17.8% of residents were under the age of 18 and 22.7% of residents were 65 years of age or older. For every 100 females there were 97.9 males, and for every 100 females age 18 and over there were 97.4 males age 18 and over.

The racial makeup of the county was 88.5% White, 4.9% Black or African American, 0.2% American Indian and Alaska Native, 0.5% Asian, 0.0% Native Hawaiian and Pacific Islander, 1.0% from some other race, and 4.8% from two or more races. Hispanic or Latino residents of any race comprised 2.1% of the population.

57.4% of residents lived in urban areas, while 42.6% lived in rural areas.

There were 14,523 households in the county, of which 23.3% had children under the age of 18 living with them and 27.8% had a female householder with no spouse or partner present. About 31.1% of all households were made up of individuals and 14.8% had someone living alone who was 65 years of age or older.

There were 16,990 housing units, of which 14.5% were vacant. Among occupied housing units, 70.7% were owner-occupied and 29.3% were renter-occupied. The homeowner vacancy rate was 1.4% and the rental vacancy rate was 6.2%.

=== 2000 Census ===
As of the census of 2000, there were 35,127 people, 14,643 households, and 10,147 families residing in the county. The population density was 110 people per square mile (42 people/km^{2}). There were 16,325 housing units at an average density of 51 units per square mile (20 units/km^{2}). The racial makeup of the county was 92.60% White, 5.57% Black or African American, 0.15% Native American, 0.32% Asian, 0.04% Pacific Islander, 0.37% from other races, and 0.94% from two or more races. 0.96% of the population were Hispanic or Latino of any race.

There were 14,643 households, out of which 26.90% had children under the age of 18 living with them, 54.90% were married couples living together, 10.50% had a female householder with no husband present, and 30.70% were non-families. 27.00% of all households were made up of individuals, and 11.10% had someone living alone who was 65 years of age or older. The average household size was 2.32 and the average family size was 2.80.

In the county, the population was spread out, with 20.60% under the age of 18, 7.30% from 18 to 24, 29.20% from 25 to 44, 27.70% from 45 to 64, and 15.20% who were 65 years of age or older. The median age was 40 years. For every 100 females, there were 97.40 males. For every 100 females age 18 and over, there were 95.20 males.

The median income for a household in the county was $33,873, and the median income for a family was $42,251. Males had a median income of $30,712 versus $21,596 for females. The per capita income for the county was $18,973. About 10.60% of families and 13.10% of the population were below the poverty line, including 18.90% of those under age 18 and 11.50% of those age 65 or over.

== Economy ==
The Volvo Trucks North America plant in Pulaski County will begin manufacturing a battery-powered VNR Electric truck model starting in early 2021. It is the largest Volvo truck plant in the world, and the Dublin, Virginia facility currently employed close to 3,000 people building multiple models of heavy-duty trucks.

== Schools ==
=== Secondary and Higher Education ===
- New River Community College
- Southwest Virginia Governor School
- Pulaski County High School

=== Middle schools ===
- Pulaski County Middle School

=== Elementary schools ===
- Pulaski Elementary School
- Dublin Elementary School
- Critzer Elementary School
- Riverlawn Elementary School
- Snowville Elementary School

== Communities ==
=== Towns ===
- Dublin
- Pulaski

=== Census-designated places ===
- Allisonia
- Belspring
- Draper
- Fairlawn
- Hiwassee
- New River
- Parrott
- Snowville

=== Other unincorporated communities ===
- Caseknife
- Claytor Lake
- Newbern
- Wurno
- Little Creek
- Delton
- Tinytown

== Politics ==
A Virginia Freedom of Information Act audit conducted of the Pulaski County Police Department led to four officers surrounding the student auditor, who had requested copies of recent incident reports.

United States presidential election results for Pulaski County, Virginia
Year	Republican		Democratic		Third party(ies)	
Year	No.	%	No.	%	No.	%
1912	196	13.27%	781	52.88%	500	33.85%
1916	721	38.68%	1,057	56.71%	86	4.61%
1920	1,710	48.43%	1,814	51.37%	7	0.20%
1924	1,422	43.33%	1,767	53.84%	93	2.83%
1928	1,998	52.32%	1,821	47.68%	0	0.00%
1932	1,109	32.11%	2,314	66.99%	31	0.90%
1936	1,180	33.51%	2,337	66.37%	4	0.11%
1940	1,023	31.43%	2,226	68.39%	6	0.18%
1944	1,302	37.65%	2,155	62.32%	1	0.03%
1948	1,691	48.99%	1,412	40.90%	349	10.11%
1952	2,815	62.03%	1,715	37.79%	8	0.18%
1956	3,517	63.05%	1,994	35.75%	67	1.20%
1960	3,059	58.75%	2,104	40.41%	44	0.85%
1964	3,101	46.10%	3,620	53.82%	5	0.07%
1968	4,409	53.35%	2,497	30.21%	1,359	16.44%
1972	6,281	72.01%	2,311	26.50%	130	1.49%
1976	4,764	44.84%	5,546	52.20%	314	2.96%
1980	5,747	47.73%	5,769	47.92%	524	4.35%
1984	8,242	64.90%	4,364	34.36%	93	0.73%
1988	6,844	58.40%	4,686	39.99%	189	1.61%
1992	6,148	43.96%	5,633	40.27%	2,206	15.77%
1996	5,387	43.78%	5,333	43.34%	1,584	12.87%
2000	7,089	55.83%	5,255	41.39%	353	2.78%
2004	8,769	61.53%	5,310	37.26%	172	1.21%
2008	8,857	58.85%	5,918	39.32%	275	1.83%
2012	8,920	60.76%	5,292	36.05%	468	3.19%
2016	10,322	68.06%	4,172	27.51%	673	4.44%
2020	12,127	69.79%	4,925	28.34%	324	1.86%
2024	12,732	71.75%	4,830	27.22%	182	1.03%

== See also ==
- National Register of Historic Places listings in Pulaski County, Virginia
