= 1940 Virginia state highway renumbering =

This article is part of the highway renumbering series.
Alabama	1928, 1957
Arkansas	1926
California	1964
Colorado	1953, 1968
Connecticut	1932, 1963
Florida	1945
Indiana	1926
Iowa	1926, 1969
Louisiana	1955
Maine	1933
Massachusetts	1933
Minnesota	1934
Missouri	1926
Montana	1932
Nebraska	1926
Nevada	1976
New Jersey	1927, 1953
New Mexico	1926, 1988
New York	1927, 1930
North Carolina	1934, 1937, 1940, 1961
North Dakota	1926
Ohio	1923, 1927, 1962
Pennsylvania	1928, 1961
Puerto Rico	1953
South Carolina	1928, 1937
South Dakota	1927, 1975
Tennessee	1983
Texas	1939, 1990
Utah	1962, 1977
Virginia	1923, 1928, 1933, 1940, 1958
Washington	1964
Wisconsin	1926
Wyoming	1927

In late 1940, the Commonwealth of Virginia renumbered some of its state highways in order to provide continuous numbers across state lines. At the same time, Maryland, North Carolina, and West Virginia took part by renumbering some of their highways to match Virginia's, and Tennessee planned to renumber one of its highways but never did.

== List of renumbered routes ==
3 - truncated

State Route 3 was eliminated northwest of Sperryville by State Route 261 (now State Route 739) and State Route 522 (a placeholder for the extension of U.S. Route 522 into Virginia).

4 - newly assigned to match Kentucky

State Route 4, which had not existed immediately prior to 1940, was assigned as a renumbering of State Route 84 to match Kentucky Route 4. This is now U.S. Route 460.

7 - truncated

State Route 7 was eliminated northwest of Winchester and replaced by State Route 522 (a placeholder for the extension of U.S. Route 522 into Virginia).

9 - eliminated and reassigned to match West Virginia

Former State Route 9 was split between State Route 120 and State Route 123. The State Route 9 designation was then used as a renumbering of State Route 238 to match West Virginia Route 9.

10 - truncated

State Route 10 south of Suffolk became State Route 32 to match North Carolina Highway 32.

15 - realigned

U.S. Route 15 was relocated between Warrenton and Gilberts Corner. The old alignment became an extension of State Route 17 (to match Maryland Route 17), while the new alignment replaced a secondary route and part of State Route 234.

16 - eliminated and reassigned to match North Carolina and West Virginia

Former State Route 16 was renumbered State Route 27. This allowed State Route 16 to be used for all of former State Route 92 from North Carolina to Mouth of Wilson, followed US 58 to Volney, State Route 88 from Volney to Tazewell, and part of former State Route 81 from Tazewell to West Virginia. In North Carolina, North Carolina Highway 16 was rerouted over former North Carolina Highway 681 to match, while the former NC 16 to Tennessee became North Carolina Highway 88. West Virginia Route 12, at least near the Virginia line, became an extension of West Virginia Route 16.

17 - extended to match Maryland

State Route 17, which continued U.S. Route 17 northwest from Fredericksburg to Opal, was extended over U.S. Route 15 from Opal to Warrenton, former US 15 from Warrenton to Middleburg, secondary routes from Middleburg to south of Purcellville, and the northern piece of State Route 234 through Purcellville to Maryland. This is now U.S. Route 17, State Route 245, secondary routes, and State Route 287. Maryland swapped its Maryland Route 17 and Maryland Route 33 to match; SR 287's connection in Maryland is still MD 17. (The number 33 could not be used in Virginia because of U.S. Route 33.)

27 - eliminated and reassigned

State Route 27 was renumbered as State Route 170. On the North Carolina side, North Carolina Highway 170, which had ended at Sligo, was extended north along former North Carolina Highway 34. This is now State Route 168 and North Carolina Highway 168. The State Route 27 designation was reused for former State Route 16.

32 - eliminated and reassigned to match North Carolina

State Route 32 had run from Boykins west to Emporia, north to Purdy, and east through Jarratt. A short piece from Boykins to Branchville became an extension of State Route 195, which had ended at Branchville. SR 32 from Branchville to Purdy became a new State Route 88, and the piece east from Purdy became an extension of State Route 137. This had the effect of freeing up the State Route 32 designation for a renumbering of State Route 10 south of Suffolk to match North Carolina Highway 32.

34 - eliminated

State Route 34, which had run from Kenbridge via Lawrenceville to North Carolina, was eliminated. It became State Route 46 to match North Carolina Highway 46, but was realigned to end at Blackstone rather than Kenbridge; State Route 137 (which had run to Blackstone) was rerouted over former SR 34 to Kenbridge.

37 - eliminated and reassigned to match North Carolina

State Route 37, from Petersburg east to Garysville, was renumbered State Route 106. This freed up State Route 37 (now U.S. Route 13) to match North Carolina Highway 37, replacing all of State Route 53.

38 - extended

State Route 38 was extended northwest from Amelia along former State Route 49 to Tobaccoville. This eliminated an overlap with SR 49 and U.S. Route 360 southwest of Amelia; SR 49 north of Tobaccoville was replaced by the extension of U.S. Route 522 into Virginia.

39 - eliminated and reassigned to match West Virginia

State Route 39, from near Wylliesburg north to Pamplin City, became an extension of State Route 47. This freed up State Route 39 as a renumbering of State Route 501 (an extension of US 501) to match West Virginia Route 39; West Virginia was "not... able to change location of Rt. 501 through their State." The original plan would have left Routes 39 and 501 unchanged.

46 - eliminated and reassigned to match North Carolina

State Route 46, from Barnes Junction to Boydton, became part of an extension of State Route 47 from Barnes Junction to Chase City and a new State Route 92 from Chase City to Boydton. The State Route 46 designation was thus freed to match North Carolina Highway 46 as a renumbering of State Route 34, but the north end was swapped with State Route 137 to end at Blackstone rather than Kenbridge.

47 - extended

State Route 47, which had run from South Hill west to Chase City, was extended west over part of State Route 46 to Barnes Junction, north over U.S. Route 15 to near Wylliesburg, and north replacing all of State Route 39 to Pamplin City. This allowed State Route 39 to be used to match West Virginia Route 39. The original plan would have left Route 47 unchanged.

49 - truncated and realigned to match North Carolina

State Route 49, which had run north to Flint Hill, was greatly truncated to Burkeville; most of the old route, from near Powhatan north to Culpeper, became part of State Route 522 (a placeholder for the extension of U.S. Route 522). The non-concurrent piece between Burkeville and near Powhatan became an extension of State Route 38; the piece north of Culpeper became an extension of State Route 242. At the south end, SR 49 was truncated to Virgilina and taken to the North Carolina line there; the former route west from Virgilina became a new State Route 96. North Carolina Highway 49 was extended from Charlotte all the way to the state line, replacing many routes including most of North Carolina Highway 144.

53 - eliminated

State Route 53 was renumbered State Route 37 to match North Carolina Highway 37.

58 - realigned

U.S. Route 58 was relocated to a new alignment between Damascus and Mouth of Wilson, replacing State Route 305. The old route mainly became part of State Route 91 from Damascus to Lodi, State Route 81 from Lodi to near Troutdale, and State Route 16 (both renumbered and lengthened from former State Route 81 and State Route 88) from Troutdale to Mouth of Wilson.

59 - eliminated and reassigned to match West Virginia

State Route 59 was renumbered as State Route 83 to match West Virginia Route 83, and State Route 59 was used on former State Route 261 to match West Virginia Route 59.

64 - eliminated and reassigned

State Route 64, from the Tennessee state line to Lebanon, was renumbered as part of a realigned State Route 71 from Lebanon to Dickensonville, overlapped US 58 from Dickensonville to St. Paul, State Route 70 from St. Paul to east of Dryden, State Route 65 from east of Dryden to Pennington Gap, State Route 70 from Pennington Gap to Tennessee. State Route 64 was used on the old route of State Route 71 from Dickensonville to Hansonville, and on former State Route 70 from Banners Corner to Fremont.

65 - eliminated and reassigned

State Route 65, from Dot to Kentucky, was renumbered as part of State Route 66 to match Kentucky, and State Route 65 was used to replace part of State Route 64 from east of Dryden to Woodway.

66 - eliminated and reassigned to match Kentucky

State Route 66, from east of Dryden to Pennington Gap, was renumbered as part of State Route 70, and State Route 66 was used on former State Route 70 from Banners Corner to Pattonsville, and State Route 65, from Dot to Kentucky to match Kentucky Route 66.

67 - eliminated and reassigned

State Route 67 was renumbered as State Route 160 to match Kentucky Route 160, and State Route 67 was used on former State Route 83.

70 - eliminated and reassigned to match Tennessee

State Route 70 was renumbered as State Route 66, from Pattonsville to Banners Corner and as State Route 64 from Banners Corner to Fremont, and State Route 70 was used on former State Route 64 from St. Paul to east of Dryden, State Route 66 from east of Dryden to Pennington Gap, and State Route 64 from Pennington Gap to Tennessee to match Tennessee State Route 70.

71 - realigned

State Route 71 was realigned over State Route 64 from Dickensonville to Lebanon. The section of State Route 71 from Dickensonville to Hansonville was renumbered as State Route 64.

75 - eliminated and reassigned to match Tennessee

State Route 75 was renumbered as State Route 77, and State Route 75 was reused on former State Route 77 to match Tennessee State Route 75.

77 - eliminated and reassigned

State Route 77 was renumbered as State Route 75 to match Tennessee State Route 75, and State Route 77 was reused on former State Route 75.

78 - eliminated and reassigned

State Route 78 was renumbered as part of State Route 91, and State Route 78 was used on former State Route 87.

81 - eliminated and reassigned

State Route 81 was renumbered as part of State Route 91 from Lodi to Frog Level, and part of State Route 16 from Tazewell to West Virginia, and State Route 81 was used on the former alignment of U.S. Route 58 from Lodi to Troutdale, and State Route 91 from Cedar Springs to Speedwell.

83 - eliminated and reassigned to match West Virginia

State Route 83 was renumbered as State Route 67, and State Route 83 was used on former State Route 59 to match West Virginia Route 83.

84 - eliminated and reassigned to match West Virginia

State Route 84 was renumbered as State Route 4 to match Kentucky Route 4, and State Route 84 was used on former State Route 271 to match West Virginia Route 84.

87 - eliminated and reassigned to match North Carolina

State Route 87 was renumbered as State Route 78, and State Route 87 was used on former State Route 106 to match North Carolina Highway 87.

88 - eliminated and reassigned

State Route 88 from Volney to Tazewell was renumbered as part of State Route 16, and State Route 88 was used as a renumbering of the portion of State Route 32 from Branchville to Purdy.

89 - newly assigned to match North Carolina

State Route 89, which had not existed immediately prior to 1940, was assigned as a renumbering of State Route 96 to match North Carolina Highway 89.

91 - eliminated and reassigned to match Tennessee

State Route 91 was renumbered as State Route 81, and State Route 91 was used on former State Route 81 from Frog Level to Lodi, former U.S. Route 58 from Lodi to Damascus and former State Route 78 from Damascus to Tennessee to match Tennessee State Route 91.

92 - eliminated and reassigned

State Route 92 from North Carolina to Mouth of Wilson was renumbered as part of State Route 16 to match North Carolina Highway 16, and State Route 92 was used on part of former State Route 46 from Chase City to Boydton.

96 - eliminated and reassigned to match North Carolina

State Route 96 was renumbered as State Route 89 to match North Carolina Highway 89, and State Route 96 was used on the portion of State Route 49 west of Virgilina to match North Carolina Highway 96 (which was renumbered from North Carolina Highway 562).

106 - eliminated and reassigned

State Route 106 was renumbered as State Route 87 to match North Carolina Highway 87, and State Route 106 was used on former State Route 37.

120 - eliminated and reassigned

State Route 120 was renumbered as State Route 245, and State Route 120 was used on part of former State Route 9.

123 - eliminated and reassigned

State Route 123 was renumbered as State Route 320, and State Route 123 was used on part of former State Route 9.

137 - realigned and extended

State Route 137 was realigned over part of State Route 34 from Danieltown to Kenbridge and extended over part of State Route 32 from Purdy east through Jarratt. The old route from Danieltown to Blackstone was renumbered as part of State Route 46. (which replaced the remainder of State Route 34).

158 - eliminated and reassigned

U.S. Route 258 was created in Virginia, replacing the section of U.S. Route 158 (which was rerouted so that it no longer goes through Virginia) northeast of Murfreesboro in Virginia, and State Route 158 was renumbered as State Route 258 to match the highway number (which became part of US 258 in 1945), and State Route 258 was renumbered as State Route 158.

160 - eliminated and reassigned to match Kentucky

State Route 160 was renumbered as State Route 271, and State Route 160 was used on former State Route 67 to match Kentucky Route 160.

170 - eliminated and reassigned to match North Carolina

State Route 170 was renumbered as State Route 238. State Route 170 was reused on former State Route 27 to match North Carolina Highway 170.

195 - extended

State Route 195 extended east from Branchville to Boykins over part of State Route 32.

207 - truncated

State Route 207 was truncated to Bowling Green. North of there was renumbered as State Route 301 (a placeholder for the extension of US 301).

234 - truncated and extended

The section of State Route 234 from Purcellville to Maryland was renumbered as part of the new State Route 17. State Route 234 was instead realigned northwest, replacing former SR 734 from Aldie to Bluemont, and former State Route 245 from Bluemont to State Route 7.

238 - eliminated and reassigned

State Route 238 was renumbered as State Route 9 to match West Virginia Route 9. State Route 238 was used on former State Route 170.

242 - extended

State Route 242 was extended south from Flint Hill along former State Route 49 to Culpeper.

245 - eliminated and reassigned

State Route 245, from State Route 7 to Bluemont, was renumbered as part of State Route 234, and State Route 245 was used on former State Route 120.

258 - eliminated and reassigned to match North Carolina

U.S. Route 258 was created in Virginia, replacing the section of U.S. Route 158 (which was rerouted so that it no longer goes through Virginia) northeast of Murfreesboro in Virginia, and State Route 158 was renumbered as State Route 258 to match the highway number (which became part of US 258 in 1945). As a result, State Route 258 was renumbered as State Route 158.

259 - extended to match West Virginia

State Route 259 was extended over State Route 275 from West Virginia to Gore to match West Virginia Route 259 (which replaced West Virginia Route 58).

261 - eliminated and reassigned

State Route 261 was renumbered as State Route 59 to match West Virginia Route 59, and State Route 261 was reassigned on a former portion of State Route 3.

271 - eliminated and reassigned

State Route 271 was renumbered as State Route 84 to match West Virginia Route 84, and State Route 271 was used on former State Route 160.

275 - eliminated

State Route 275, from West Virginia to Gore, was renumbered as an extended State Route 259 to match West Virginia Route 259.

301 - newly assigned to match Maryland

State Route 301, which had not existed immediately prior to 1940, was assigned as a placeholder for the extension of U.S. Route 301 into Virginia, following U.S. Route 1 from Petersburg to Richmond, State Route 2 from Richmond to Bowling Green, and State Route 207 from Bowling Green to Maryland to match Maryland Route 301.

305 - eliminated

State Route 305, from Damascus to Mouth of Wilson, was eliminated and transferred to a rerouted US 58.

320 - newly created

State Route 320, which had not existed immediately prior to 1940, was assigned as a renumbering of State Route 123.

501 - truncated

State Route 501, an extension of US 501, was renumbered as State Route 39 to match West Virginia Route 39; the original plans had this staying 501, but West Virginia was "not... able to change location of Rt. 501 through their State."

522 - newly assigned to match West Virginia

State Route 522, which had not existed immediately prior to 1940, was assigned as a placeholder for the extension of U.S. Route 522 into Virginia, replacing part of State Route 7 from West Virginia to Winchester, part of State Route 3 from Winchester to Sperryville, and part of State Route 49 from Culpeper to Powhatan to match West Virginia.
