= 1928 Virginia state highway renumbering =

This article is part of the highway renumbering series.
Alabama	1928, 1957
Arkansas	1926
California	1964
Colorado	1953, 1968
Connecticut	1932, 1963
Florida	1945
Indiana	1926
Iowa	1926, 1969
Louisiana	1955
Maine	1933
Massachusetts	1933
Minnesota	1934
Missouri	1926
Montana	1932
Nebraska	1926
Nevada	1976
New Jersey	1927, 1953
New Mexico	1926, 1988
New York	1927, 1930
North Carolina	1934, 1937, 1940, 1961
North Dakota	1926
Ohio	1923, 1927, 1962
Pennsylvania	1928, 1961
Puerto Rico	1953
South Carolina	1928, 1937
South Dakota	1927, 1975
Tennessee	1983
Texas	1939, 1990
Utah	1962, 1977
Virginia	1923, 1928, 1933, 1940, 1958
Washington	1964
Wisconsin	1926
Wyoming	1927

In August 1928, the U.S. state of Virginia renumbered many of its state highways. This renumbering was caused by a new law that greatly increased the state highway mileage. The old system, in which three-digit routes were spurs of two-digit routes, was unwieldy for a large number of routes, and so a new system, in which three-digit routes were assigned by district, was adopted.

== List of routes ==
=== Two-digit routes, 10-55 ===
New	Old	Notes
SR 10	SR 10	
SR 11	SR 11	
SR 12	SR 12	
SR 13	SR 13	
SR 14	SR 14	
SR 15	SR 15	
SR 16	SR 16	
SR 17	SR 17	
SR 18	SR 18	
SR 19	SR 19	
SR 20	SR 20	
SR 21	SR 21	
SR 22	SR 22 and SR 143	
SR 23	SR 23	
SR 24	SR 24	
SR 25	SR 25 and SR 315	
SR 26	SR 26	
SR 27	SR 27	
SR 28	SR 28	
SR 29	SR 29 and SR 131	
SR 30	SR 30	
SR 31	SR 31	
SR 32	SR 32	
SR 33	SR 33	
SR 34	SR 34	
SR 35	SR 35	
SR 36	SR 36	
SR 37	SR 37	
SR 38	SR 38 and part of SR 291	
SR 39	SR 39	
SR 40	SR 40	
SR 41	SR 41	
SR 42	new	
SR 43	new	
SR 44	part of SR 201	
SR 45	new	
SR 46	new	
SR 47	part of SR 323	
SR 48	SR 351	
SR 49	new	
SR 50	SR 311	
SR 51	SR 312	
SR 52	new	
SR 53	new	
SR 54	part of SR 251	
SR 55	SR 373	

=== District 1 ===
New	Old	Notes
SR 100	SR 107	
SR 101	new	
SR 102	new	
SR 103	SR 1010	
SR 104	new	
SR 105	new	
SR 106	SR 115 and SR 116	
SR 107	new	
SR 108	SR 102	
SR 109	new	
SR 110	SR 106	
SR 111	new	a small piece had been SR 125
SR 112	SR 105	
SR 113	new	
SR 114	new	
SR 115	new	
SR 116	SR 121	
SR 117	new	
SR 118	new	
SR 119	new	
SR 120	SR 119 and part of SR 1141	
SR 121	part of SR 114 and part of SR 1141	
SR 122	part of SR 114	
SR 123	SR 113	
SR 124	new	
SR 125	SR 118	
SR 126	SR 111	
SR 127	new	
SR 128	SR 117	
SR 129	SR 123	
SR 130	new	
SR 131	SR 112	

=== District 2 ===
New	Old	Notes
SR 200	new	
SR 201	SR 337	
SR 202	new	
SR 203	new	
SR 204	SR 335	
SR 205	SR 232	
SR 206	new	
SR 207	new	
SR 208	new	
SR 209	new	
SR 210	new	
SR 211	new	
SR 212	new	
SR 213	SR 109	
SR 214	new	
SR 215	new	
SR 216	SR 231	
SR 217	SR 221	

=== District 3 ===
New	Old	Notes
SR 300	new	
SR 301	SR 144	
SR 302	new	
SR 303	new	
SR 304	part of SR 104	
SR 305	new	
SR 306	part of SR 104	
SR 307	new	
SR 308	new	
SR 309	new	
SR 310	SR 133	
SR 311	new	
SR 312	new	
SR 313	SR 182	
SR 314	new	
SR 315	SR 181	
SR 316	new	

=== District 4 ===
New	Old	Notes
SR 400	part of SR 201	
SR 401	part of SR 323 and a new routing	
SR 402	SR 122	
SR 403	new	
SR 404	new	
SR 405	new	
SR 406	SR 132	
SR 407	SR 316	
SR 408	SR 1011	
SR 409	new	
SR 410	SR 313	
SR 411	new	
SR 412	new	
SR 413	part of SR 41	
SR 414	new	
SR 415	SR 393	
SR 416	new	
SR 417	SR 191	
SR 418	new	
SR 419	new	
SR 420	new	
SR 421	SR 3111	

=== District 5 ===
New	Old	Notes
SR 500	part of SR 101 and SR 1013	
SR 501	part of SR 101	
SR 502	SR 1012	
SR 503	new	
SR 504	new	
SR 505	SR 103	
SR 506	new	
SR 507	SR 108	
SR 508	new	
SR 509	new	
SR 510	SR 392	
SR 511	new	
SR 512	SR 394	
SR 513	new	
SR 514	SR 391	
SR 515	new	
SR 516	new	
SR 517	new	
SR 518	new	
SR 519	SR 397	
SR 520	new	
SR 521	SR 341	
SR 522	SR 342	
SR 523	new	
SR 524	SR 343	
SR 525	new	

=== District 6 ===
New	Old	Notes
SR 600	part of SR 291	
SR 601	new	
SR 602	new	
SR 603	new	
SR 604	new	
SR 605	new	
SR 606	new	
SR 607	SR 371	
SR 608	new	
SR 609	new	
SR 610	SR 372	
SR 611	SR 377	
SR 612	SR 375	
SR 613	new	
SR 614	new	
SR 615	new	
SR 616	new	
SR 617	new	
SR 618	new	
SR 619	new	

=== District 7 ===
New	Old	Notes
SR 700	new	
SR 701	new	
SR 702	SR 374	
SR 703	new	
SR 704	new	
SR 705	new	
SR 706	new	
SR 707	new	
SR 708	new	
SR 709	new	
SR 710	SR 314	
SR 711	new	
SR 712	new	
SR 713	new	

=== District 8 ===
New	Old	Notes
SR 800	part of SR 338 and SR 395	
SR 801	SR 141	
SR 802	new	
SR 803	new	
SR 804	part of SR 338	
SR 805	part of SR 338	
SR 806	new	
SR 807	new	
SR 808	new	
SR 809	part of SR 251	
SR 810	SR 171	
SR 811	part of SR 251?	
SR 812	new	
SR 813	new	
SR 814	SR 333	
SR 815	part of SR 251	
SR 816	new	
SR 817	SR 332	
SR 818	new	
SR 819	new	
SR 820	SR 336	
SR 821	new	
SR 822	SR 339	
SR 823	new	
SR 824	SR 331	
SR 825	part of SR 251	
SR 826	SR 376	
