= 1927 Ohio state highway renumbering =

This article is part of the highway renumbering series.
| Alabama | 1928, 1957 |
| Arkansas | 1926 |
| California | 1964 |
| Colorado | 1953, 1968 |
| Connecticut | 1932, 1963 |
| Florida | 1945 |
| Indiana | 1926 |
| Iowa | 1926, 1969 |
| Louisiana | 1955 |
| Maine | 1933 |
| Massachusetts | 1933 |
| Minnesota | 1934 |
| Missouri | 1926 |
| Montana | 1932 |
| Nebraska | 1926 |
| Nevada | 1976 |
| New Jersey | 1927, 1953 |
| New Mexico | 1926, 1988 |
| New York | 1927, 1930 |
| North Carolina | 1934, 1937, 1940, 1961 |
| North Dakota | 1926 |
| Ohio | 1923, 1927, 1962 |
| Pennsylvania | 1928, 1961 |
| Puerto Rico | 1953 |
| South Carolina | 1928, 1937 |
| South Dakota | 1927, 1975 |
| Tennessee | 1983 |
| Texas | 1939, 1990 |
| Utah | 1962, 1977 |
| Virginia | 1923, 1928, 1933, 1940, 1958 |
| Washington | 1964 |
| Wisconsin | 1926 |
| Wyoming | 1927 |

In early July 1927, the Ohio Department of Highways implemented the system of United States Numbered Highways that had been approved by the states in late 1926. This resulted in the renumbering of many of the state highways to avoid overlaps with the new U.S. Routes and numbers used by both classes of route. In addition to the U.S. Routes, a new State Route 6 was formed, extending West Virginia Route 6 northwest from the Ohio River at Bridgeport to Norwalk. (Route 6 later became U.S. Route 250 in both states.)

A number of State Routes - 1, 10, 13, 15, 16, 31, 49, 95, 112, 124, 130, 160, 180, and 223 - were entirely replaced by U.S. Routes or the new State Route 6. The numbers 6, 20, 21, 22, 23, 24, 25, 27, 30, 40, 42, 50, 52, and 127 conflicted with new designations, so the State Routes with those numbers were renamed. Some others - 28, 48, 63, 125, 126, 129, 142, and 263 - were replaced by extensions of other State Routes or new State Routes where not part of a U.S. Route. State Routes 102 and 249 became portions of other routes, but the numbers were reused in the immediate vicinity, 102 for the old alignment of 2 and 249 as part of a three-way route alignment swap in the immediate vicinity. The numbers freed up were reused on other routes.

| New | Old | From | To |
|---|---|---|---|
| U.S. Route 20 | State Route 23 | Indiana | West of Toledo |
| U.S. Route 20 | State Route 63 | West of Toledo | Perrysburg |
| U.S. Route 20 | State Route 102 | Perrysburg | Southeast of Woodville |
| U.S. Route 20 | State Route 2 | Southeast of Woodville | Pennsylvania |
| U.S. Route 21 | State Route 8 | Marietta | Newcomerstown |
| U.S. Route 21 | State Route 20 | Newcomerstown | New Philadelphia |
| U.S. Route 21 | State Route 13 | Northwest of Strasburg (US 21 overlapped State Route 6 from New Philadelphia) | Cleveland |
| U.S. Route 22 | State Route 49 | Cambridge | Pennsylvania |
| U.S. Route 23 | State Route 4 | Portsmouth | Marion |
| U.S. Route 23 | State Route 22 | North of Marion (US 23 overlapped SR 4 from Marion) | Carey |
| U.S. Route 23 | State Route 63 | Carey | Perrysburg |
| U.S. Route 23 | State Route 6 | Perrysburg | Michigan |
| U.S. Route 24 | State Route 31 | Indiana | Michigan |
| U.S. Route 25 | State Route 124 | Sharonville (US 25 overlapped US 42 from Cincinnati) | Franklin |
| U.S. Route 25 | State Route 6 | Franklin | Perrysburg (US 25 overlapped US 20 to Maumee and US 24 to Toledo) |
| U.S. Route 25 | State Route 6 | Toledo | Michigan |
| U.S. Route 27 | State Route 129 | Cincinnati | Ross |
| U.S. Route 27 | State Route 223 | Northeast of Ross (US 27 overlapped SR 128 from Ross) | McGonigle |
| U.S. Route 27 | State Route 126 | McGonigle | Indiana |
| U.S. Route 30 | State Route 5 | Indiana | Delphos |
| U.S. Route 30 | State Route 10 | Delphos | Jefferson (US 30 overlapped SR 5 to Wooster) |
| U.S. Route 30 | State Route 5 | Wooster | Cannons Mills (US 30 overlapped SR 7 to East Liverpool) |
| U.S. Route 40 | State Route 1 | Indiana | Bridgeport |
| U.S. Route 42 | State Route 28 | Cincinnati | London |
| U.S. Route 42 | State Route 160 | London | Delaware |
| U.S. Route 42 | State Route 55 | Delaware | Medina |
| U.S. Route 42 | State Route 3 | Medina | Cleveland |
| U.S. Route 50 | State Route 7 | Indiana | Cincinnati |
| U.S. Route 50 | State Route 27 | Cincinnati | Milford |
| U.S. Route 50 | State Route 26 | Milford | Athens |
| U.S. Route 50 | State Route 144 | Athens | Coolville (US 50 overlapped SR 7 to Belpre) |
| U.S. Route 52 | State Route 130 | Indiana | Cincinnati |
| U.S. Route 52 | State Route 7 | Cincinnati | Chesapeake |
| U.S. Route 127 | State Route 112 | Toledo | Michigan |
| U.S. Route 322 | State Route 15 | Cleveland | Pennsylvania |
| U.S. Route 422 | State Route 16 | Cleveland | Pennsylvania |
| State Route 2 | State Route 2 | Indiana | Toledo |
| State Route 2 | State Route 23 | Toledo | West of Port Clinton (SR 2 overlapped SR 163 to west of Marblehead and crossed on a ferry to Sandusky) |
| State Route 2 | State Route 12 | Sandusky | Cleveland |
| State Route 3 | State Route 3 | Cincinnati | Medina |
| State Route 3 | State Route 55 | Medina | Cleveland |
| State Route 4 | State Route 6 | Cincinnati | Middletown |
| State Route 4 | State Route 52 | Middletown | Southwest of Milford Center |
| State Route 4 | State Route 55 | Southwest of Milford Center | Marysville |
| State Route 4 | State Route 38 | Marysville | Marion |
| State Route 4 | State Route 4 | Marion | Sandusky |
| State Route 5 | State Route 5 | Delphos | Wooster |
| State Route 6 | State Route 180 | Fitchville (SR 6 overlapped SR 13 from Norwalk) | Savannah (SR 6 overlapped SR 60 to Ashland) |
| State Route 6 | State Route 95 | Wooster (SR 6 overlapped SR 5 from Ashland) | Northwest of Strasburg |
| State Route 6 | State Route 13 | Northwest of Strasburg | Bridgeport |
| State Route 7 | State Route 7 | Chesapeake | Conneaut |
| State Route 8 | State Route 48 | Fly | Uhrichsville |
| State Route 8 | State Route 8 | Uhrichsville | Cleveland |
| State Route 9 | State Route 9 | Cincinnati | West of Ney (overlapped SR 22 to Ney until 1927) |
| State Route 9 | State Route 249 | West of Ney | South of Bryan |
| State Route 9 | State Route 9 | South of Bryan | Michigan |
| State Route 10 | State Route 40 | Washington Court House | Zanesville |
| State Route 12 | State Route 12 | Findlay | Sandusky |
| State Route 13 | State Route 30 | Chauncey | Sandusky |
| State Route 15 | State Route 9 | South of Bryan | Ney |
| State Route 15 | State Route 22 | Ney | Carey |
| State Route 16 | State Route 20 | Columbus | Newcomerstown |
| State Route 16 | State Route 8 | Newcomerstown | Uhrichsville |
| State Route 26 | State Route 26 | Athens | Griffith |
| State Route 28 | State Route 27 | Milford | West of Chillicothe (SR 27 overlapped SR 26 to Chillicothe) |
| State Route 31 | State Route 21 | Pomeroy | Findlay |
| State Route 32 | State Route 32 | Indiana | Marysville |
| State Route 32 | State Route 55 | Marysville | Delaware |
| State Route 38 | State Route 38 | Ripley | Marysville |
| State Route 39 | State Route 39 | Shelby | Dover |
| State Route 39 | State Route 20 | Dover (SR 39 overlapped US 21 from New Philadelphia) | East Liverpool |
| State Route 39 | State Route 5 | East Liverpool | Pennsylvania |
| State Route 48 | State Route 50 | Lebanon | Abe |
| State Route 49 | State Route 51 | Northwest of Van Wert | Michigan |
| State Route 51 | State Route 51 | Dayton | Willshire |
| State Route 55 | State Route 55 | Ludlow Falls | Southwest of Milford Center |
| State Route 63 | State Route 125 | West of Monroe | Lebanon |
| State Route 73 | State Route 6 | Middletown | Franklin |
| State Route 73 | State Route 73 | Franklin | West of Portsmouth |
| State Route 95 | State Route 42 | Marion | North of Cambridge |
| State Route 102 | State Route 2 | Toledo | Southeast of Woodville |
| State Route 104 | State Route 104 | North of Chillicothe (SR 104 overlapped SR 11 from Chillicothe until 1927) | Columbus |
| State Route 112 | State Route 104 | Northwest of Portsmouth | Waverly (SR 104 overlapped US 23 to Chillicothe) |
| State Route 124 | State Route 24 | Hillsboro | East of Rolandus |
| State Route 125 | State Route 25 | Cincinnati | Friendship |
| State Route 126 | State Route 129 | Indiana | Ross |
| State Route 126 | State Route 26 | Dunlap (SR 126 overlapped US 27 from Ross) | Milford |
| State Route 129 | State Route 127 | Indiana | Hamilton |
| State Route 130 | State Route 126 | Hamilton | McGonigle |
| State Route 142 | State Route 28 | London | West Jefferson |
| State Route 144 | State Route 144 | Coolville | Little Hocking |
| State Route 159 | State Route 27 | Hopetown (SR 27 overlapped SR 4 from Chillicothe) | Kinnikinnick |
| State Route 159 | State Route 159 | Kinnikinnick | Amanda |
| State Route 160 | State Route 142 | Gallipolis | Hamden |
| State Route 170 | State Route 263 | East Liverpool | East Palestine (SR 170 overlapped SR 14 to Unity) |
| State Route 170 | State Route 170 | Unity | Petersburg |
| State Route 180 | State Route 27 | Kinnikinnick | Enterprise (SR 27 overlapped SR 21 to Logan) |
| State Route 223 | State Route 102 | Holland | Northwest of Maumee (SR 102 overlapped US 20 to Perrysburg) |
| State Route 249 | State Route 22 | Indiana | Ney |
| State Route 263 | State Route 63 | Sylvania | West of Toledo |
| State Route 263 | State Route 23 | West of Toledo | Toledo |

== Later renumberings due to U.S. Routes ==
- State Route 250 was renumbered as State Route 226 when U.S. Route 250 was created in 1928 over State Route 6.
- State Route 223 was renumbered as State Route 283 when U.S. Route 223 was created in Ohio in 1930 over U.S. Route 127, which was rerouted over part of State Route 108 (see below), and most of State Route 9 (The rest of which became part of State Route 15).
- US 22 extended to Cincinnati over State Route 10 in 1931.
- State Route 6 was renumbered as State Route 283, and State Route 283 was renumbered as State Route 326 when U.S. Route 6 extended into Ohio in 1932 over part of State Route 167, part of State Route 7, part of State Route 85, part of State Route 2, part of State Route 34, and more of State Route 2 (which was rerouted over the former State Route 108 in 1935) to Indiana.
- State Route 36 was renumbered as State Route 5 when U.S. Route 36 extended into Ohio in 1932 over all of State Route 200, part of State Route 29, part of State Route 55, following State Route 4, part of State Route 32, following State Route 37 (47 until 1932), following State Route 3, part of State Route 95, part of State Route 16, and part of US 250. State Route 5 was transferred to US 30N (later the new alignment of US 30) (note that US 30S (old alignment of US 30) is now State Route 309).
- State Route 62 was renumbered as State Route 19 when U.S. Route 62 extended into Ohio in 1932 over part of State Route 38 to Washington Court House, following State Route 3, and all of State Route 19.
- State Route 68 was renumbered as State Route 47 when U.S. Route 68 extended into Ohio in 1933 over all of State Route 10 which overlapped the following (these overlaps were removed): all of State Route 221, part of State Route 53 (the southernmost section (separated by US 68) was renumbered as State Route 221), part of State Route 31, and part of US 25.
- State Route 224 was renumbered as State Route 177 when U.S. Route 224 was created in 1933 over State Route 17.
- State Route 35 was renumbered as State Route 9 when U.S. Route 35 was created in 1934 over State Route 11 (which was eliminated the next year).
- State Route 33 was renumbered as State Route 108 when U.S. Route 33 was created in 1937 over part of State Route 54, most of State Route 32 (the remainder became part of State Route 54, but this section became part of State Route 29 by 1939), and part of State Route 31.

== See also ==
- Numbered highways in Ohio
