= 1933 Virginia state highway renumbering =

This article is part of the highway renumbering series.
Alabama	1928, 1957
Arkansas	1926
California	1964
Colorado	1953, 1968
Connecticut	1932, 1963
Florida	1945
Indiana	1926
Iowa	1926, 1969
Louisiana	1955
Maine	1933
Massachusetts	1933
Minnesota	1934
Missouri	1926
Montana	1932
Nebraska	1926
Nevada	1976
New Jersey	1927, 1953
New Mexico	1926, 1988
New York	1927, 1930
North Carolina	1934, 1937, 1940, 1961
North Dakota	1926
Ohio	1923, 1927, 1962
Pennsylvania	1928, 1961
Puerto Rico	1953
South Carolina	1928, 1937
South Dakota	1927, 1975
Tennessee	1983
Texas	1939, 1990
Utah	1962, 1977
Virginia	1923, 1928, 1933, 1940, 1958
Washington	1964
Wisconsin	1926
Wyoming	1927

In 1933, the U.S. state of Virginia renumbered almost all of its state highways. This renumbering was caused by the assignment of numbers from 600 up to the new secondary system, but all three-digit numbers were affected. At the same time, all numbers that conflicted with U.S. Routes - except State Route 13 - were renumbered, and all long overlaps with U.S. Routes were eliminated. Several new routes had the same numbers as U.S. Routes and served as their extensions.

== List of routes ==
Prior to 1933, routes were assigned by district. Two-digit routes generally crossed district lines, while three-digit routes were assigned with their first digit as the district number. The new system also grouped routes by district, but not as strictly (these routes could cross lines) and with no room for expansion; thus additional routes, starting later in 1933, often received numbers from 283 up.

Note: a number of routes were added in 1932, and their pre-1933 numbers are not given in the meeting minutes. These routes are marked as "unknown".

=== Two-digit routes, 2-57, and U.S. Route extensions ===
New	Old	Notes
US 1	SR 31	
SR 2	part of SR 50 and SR 421	renumbered because of US 50
SR 3	part of SR 37 and SR 827	
SR 4	SR 814, part of SR 17, part of SR 39, SR 420, SR 429, part of SR 39, SR 415, part of SR 30, part of SR 38, and SR 603	
SR 5	SR 835, part of SR 39, and SR 41	
SR 6	part of SR 18 and SR 19	renumbered because of US 19
SR 7	part of SR 54, SR 826, part of SR 37, and SR 822	
SR 8	SR 23	renumbered because of US 23
SR 9	SR 25	renumbered because of US 25E; originally planned to keep its number due to US 25E being designated SR 61; changed to SR 9 by May 1933
SR 10	part of SR 10	truncated due to U.S. Routes; originally planned to be rerouted west of Blackstone over what became SR 48 (now SR 40), SR 40, and SR 109; swapped with SR 109 by May 1933
US 11	part of SR 10 and part of SR 33	
US 11W	part of SR 10	
US 11E	unknown	
SR 12	part of SR 17	
US 13	SR 34	
SR 13	part of SR 13	Only conflicting state route with a US highway; highway kept its old number
SR 14	part of SR 29, part of SR 38, and SR 600	renumbered because of US 29
US 15	SR 32	
SR 16	SR 16 and SR 46	
US 17	SR 40, SR 503, part of SR 514, part of SR 515, SR 602, part of SR 29, and part of SR 38	
SR 17	part of SR 38	extension of US 17
SR 18	SR 800	
US 19	part of SR 10 (this section overlapped US 11), part of SR 110, part of SR 131, and part of SR 11	
SR 20	SR 316 and SR 702	
US 21	SR 26	
SR 22	part of SR 39	
US 23	SR 120, part of SR 11 part of SR 106, part of SR 10 (this section overlapped US 58) part of SR 107	US 23 and SR 64 overlapped after the renumbering
SR 24	part of SR 43, SR 207, part of SR 306, SR 308, and SR 325	
US 25E	part of SR 10 and SR 100	Originally planned as SR 61; planned SR 61 deleted in May 1933
SR 26	part of SR 306, SR 307, and SR 327	
SR 27	SR 27 and part of SR 514	
SR 28	part of SR 28	
US 29	part of SR 14, part of SR 18, and part of SR 28	
SR 29	part of SR 28	alternate route of US 29
SR 30	part of SR 30, SR 53, and SR 428	
SR 31	SR 510, SR 542, and SR 547	
SR 32	SR 509 and SR 538	
SR 33	SR 508	planned to be given a different number when US 33 was in plans
SR 34	SR 401	
SR 35	SR 35	
SR 36	SR 408, SR 435, and parts of SR 409 and SR 407	
SR 37	SR 407	
SR 38	SR 406	
SR 39	SR 304	
SR 40	SR 20	originally planned as SR 109 west of what became SR 109 and part of SR 10 east of there; planned as SR 10 by May 1933; renumbered to SR 40 by May 9
SR 41	part of SR 301	
SR 42	SR 42	
SR 43	SR 215 and SR 320	
SR 44	part of SR 419	
SR 45	SR 45 and SR 310	
SR 46	part of SR 12	
SR 47	SR 434	
SR 48	SR 48	originally planned to be rerouted west to Burkeville
SR 49	part of SR 44, SR 49, SR 59, part of SR 406, SR 419, and SR 707	
US 50	SR 36 and part of SR 21 (this section overlapped US 211)	
SR 51	SR 51	
SR 52	SR 505	originally planned to also contain pre-1933 SR 52 until May 1933 when US 86 (now US 460) was added to the plans
SR 53	SR 506	
SR 54	part of SR 39 and part of SR 50	
SR 55	SR 55	
SR 56	SR 56, part of SR 306, SR 314, and part of SR 808	
SR 57	SR 57 and SR 203	
US 58	part of SR 12, part of SR 44, SR 400, part of SR 12, part of SR 10, part of SR 106 (this section overlapped US 23), SR 142, part of SR 10, and part of SR 103	
US 60	part of SR 14, part of SR 13 (this section overlapped US 11), part of SR 39, and SR 500	
US 121	part of SR 15	
SR 121	the remainder of SR 15	extension of US 121
US 158	part of SR 507	
SR 158	the remainder of SR 507	extension of US 158
US 211	SR 21	
US 221	part of SR 26 (this section overlapped US 21), part of SR 12, and SR 205	originally planned to extend northeast via US 460 and US 360; this plan was eliminated by May 1933 due to US 86 & 33 (later 360 & 460) planned
US 301	SR 24 and part of SR 35	
US 311	part of SR 33	
SR 311	part of SR 22	extension of US 311
US 340	part of SR 37, part of SR 54	
SR 340	SR 809, SR 815, part of SR 17, and SR 825	extension of US 340
US 360	part of SR 12 and part of SR 20	originally planned to be part of SR 40 and US 221; planned as US 33 in May 1933; numbered US 360 on May 16, 1933
US 421	unknown	
US 460	part of SR 10, SR 52, part of SR 10, and part of SR 12	originally planned as part of US 221, SR 48, SR 10, SR 52, and SR 10; planned as US 86 in May 1933; numbered US 460 on May 16, 1933
US 501	part of SR 18 and part of SR 14	originally planned as part of SR 9
SR 501	part of SR 17, part of SR 804, and part of SR 805	extension of US 501; originally planned as part of SR 9

=== District 1, 59-98 ===
New	Old	Notes
SR 59	SR 121	
SR 61	SR 127	originally planned as 86; changed to SR 61 in May 1933
SR 62	SR 101	
SR 63	SR 102	
SR 64	part of SR 10, SR 11, and part of SR 103	renumbered because of US 11
SR 65	SR 104	
SR 66	part of SR 103	
SR 67	SR 106	
SR 68	SR 119	
SR 69	SR 133	
SR 70	part of SR 10 and SR 123	
SR 71	SR 107 and part of SR 110	
SR 72	SR 122	
SR 73	SR 141	
SR 74	SR 134	
SR 75	SR 140	
SR 76	SR 109	
SR 77	part of SR 110	
SR 78	SR 130	
SR 79	SR 135	
SR 80	SR 111	
SR 81	SR 112	
SR 82	SR 131	
SR 83	SR 138 (which had two pieces)	
SR 84	SR 126	
SR 85	SR 128	
SR 87	SR 136	
SR 88	SR 113 (which had two pieces)	
SR 89	SR 114	
SR 90	part of SR 115	
SR 91	part of SR 115	
SR 92	SR 139	
SR 93	SR 129	
SR 94	SR 58	renumbered because of US 58
SR 95	SR 118	
SR 96	SR 117	
SR 97	SR 47	
SR 98	SR 26Y	

=== District 2, 99-124 ===
New	Old	
SR 99	part of SR 212 and SR 228	
SR 100	part of SR 212 and SR 213	
SR 101	part of SR 10	
SR 102	SR 210	
SR 103	part of SR 200 and SR 220	
SR 104	part of SR 200	
SR 105	unknown	
SR 106	SR 201	
SR 107	unknown	
SR 108	SR 202	
SR 109	SR 222	originally planned as part of rerouted SR 10; swapped with 10 by May 1933, moving road to this route
SR 110	SR 211	
SR 111	SR 218	
SR 112	SR 224	
SR 113	SR 214	
SR 114	SR 209 (which had two pieces)	
SR 115	SR 226	
SR 116	SR 206	
SR 117	SR 208	
SR 118	SR 221	
SR 119	part of SR 22	
SR 120	SR 219	
SR 122	SR 204	
SR 123	SR 217	
SR 124	SR 216	

=== District 3, 125-135 and 150-152 ===
New	Old	
SR 86	part of SR 301	originally planned as part (later all) of SR 40; was to be given a new number by May 1933; 86 was chosen because US 86 was renumbered
SR 125	SR 300	
SR 126	SR 303 and SR 323	
SR 127	part of SR 43	
SR 128	SR 319	
SR 129	part of SR 18	
SR 130	SR 311 and SR 317	
SR 131	part of SR 306 and SR 309	
SR 132	SR 326	
SR 133	SR 305	
SR 134	SR 324	
SR 135	SR 318	
SR 150	SR 312	
SR 151	SR 313	
SR 152	SR 322	
SR 283	part of SR 306	

=== District 4, 136-149 and 153-163 ===
New	Old	Notes
SR 136	SR 403 and SR 404	
SR 137	SR 423 and SR 437	
SR 138	SR 416 and SR 433	
SR 139	SR 442	
SR 140	SR 402 and SR 438	
SR 141	SR 426	
SR 142	SR 439	
SR 143	SR 444	
SR 144	SR 425	
SR 145	SR 410	
SR 146	SR 430	
SR 147	SR 418	
SR 148	SR 412	
SR 149	SR 422	
SR 153	SR 405, part of SR 409, and SR 441	
SR 154	SR 445	
SR 155	SR 413 and SR 440	
SR 156	SR 414	
SR 157	SR 443	
SR 159	SR 427	
SR 160	SR 431	
SR 161	SR 432	
SR 162	SR 436	
SR 163	SR 424	
SR 197	SR 19/SR 418 duplex	unknown what this was

=== District 5, 164-196 ===
New	Old
SR 164	SR 501
SR 165	SR 502
SR 166	SR 504
SR 167	part of SR 511, part of SR 513, and part of SR 533
SR 168	part of SR 513, SR 529, and SR 532, part of SR 511, and part of SR 514
SR 169	SR 512
SR 170	part of SR 514 and SR 518
SR 171	part of SR 515
SR 172	SR 516
SR 173	SR 517 and SR 528
SR 174	SR 519
SR 175	SR 520
SR 176	SR 521
SR 177	SR 548
SR 178	part of SR 522 and SR 526
SR 179	SR 540
SR 180	SR 523
SR 181	part of SR 522
SR 182	SR 530
SR 183	SR 537
SR 184	SR 527
SR 185	SR 524
SR 186	SR 525
SR 187	SR 531
SR 188	SR 534
SR 189	SR 535
SR 190	SR 536
SR 191	SR 539
SR 192	SR 541
SR 193	SR 543
SR 194	SR 544
SR 195	SR 545
SR 196	SR 546

=== District 6, 198-229 ===
New	Old
SR 198	part of SR 38 and SR 601
SR 199	SR 604
SR 200	SR 605
SR 201	SR 606 and SR 628
SR 202	SR 607 and SR 37-W
SR 203	SR 608
SR 204	SR 609 and SR 610
SR 205	SR 611
SR 206	SR 612
SR 207	SR 613 and SR 614
SR 208	SR 615
SR 209	SR 616
SR 210	SR 617
SR 212	SR 618
SR 213	SR 619
SR 214	SR 620
SR 215	SR 621
SR 216	SR 622
SR 217	SR 623
SR 218	SR 624
SR 219	SR 625
SR 220	SR 626
SR 222	SR 627
SR 223	SR 629
SR 224	SR 630
SR 225	part of SR 38
SR 226	SR 631
SR 227	part of SR 30
SR 228	SR 632
SR 229	SR 633

=== District 7, 230-248 ===
New	Old
SR 230	SR 700, SR 704, and SR 722
SR 231	SR 701, SR 705, and SR 836
SR 232	SR 706
SR 233	SR 708
SR 234	SR 709 and SR 721
SR 235	SR 710 and SR 725
SR 236	SR 711
SR 237	SR 712
SR 238	SR 713
SR 239	SR 714
SR 240	SR 716
SR 241	SR 717
SR 242	SR 718
SR 243	SR 719
SR 244	SR 720
SR 245	SR 726
SR 246	SR 723
SR 247	SR 727
SR 248	SR 728

=== District 8, 249-282 ===
New	Old
SR 249	SR 801
SR 250	SR 802
SR 251	SR 806
SR 252	part of SR 808 and SR 830
SR 253	SR 807
SR 254	SR 810 and SR 831
SR 255	SR 811
SR 256	SR 812
SR 257	SR 813 and SR 838
SR 258	SR 816
SR 259	SR 817
SR 260	SR 818
SR 261	SR 824
SR 262	SR 819
SR 263	SR 820
SR 264	SR 844
SR 265	SR 845
SR 266	SR 821 and SR 836
SR 267	SR 823
SR 268	SR 828
SR 269	SR 803 and part of SR 804
SR 270	part of SR 805
SR 271	part of SR 39
SR 272	SR 829
SR 273	SR 832
SR 274	SR 833
SR 275	SR 834
SR 276	part of SR 839
SR 277	part of SR 54
SR 278	SR 840
SR 279	SR 841
SR 280	SR 842
SR 281	SR 843
SR 282	part of SR 839
