= 1958 Virginia state highway renumbering =

This article is part of the highway renumbering series.
Alabama	1928, 1957
Arkansas	1926
California	1964
Colorado	1953, 1968
Connecticut	1932, 1963
Florida	1945
Indiana	1926
Iowa	1926, 1969
Louisiana	1955
Maine	1933
Massachusetts	1933
Minnesota	1934
Missouri	1926
Montana	1932
Nebraska	1926
Nevada	1976
New Jersey	1927, 1953
New Mexico	1988
New York	1927, 1930
North Carolina	1934, 1937, 1940, 1961
Ohio	1923, 1927, 1962
Pennsylvania	1928, 1961
Puerto Rico	1953
South Carolina	1928, 1937
South Dakota	1927, 1975
Tennessee	1983
Texas	1939
Utah	1962, 1977
Virginia	1923, 1928, 1933, 1940, 1958
Washington	1964
Wisconsin	1926
Wyoming	1927

In March 1958, the Commonwealth of Virginia renumbered four of its state highways as the Interstate Renumbering of 1958 in order to avoid duplication with the new Interstate Highway System.

== New routes ==
Number	Length (mi)	Length (km)	Southern or western terminus	Northern or eastern terminus	Formed	Removed	Notes
SR 63	39	63	St. Paul	Haysi	1958	current	Formerly SR 64
I-64	299	481	West Virginia state line near Covington	Chesapeake	1958	current	New route
SR 65	34	55	Clinchport	Castlewood	1958	current	Formerly SR 66
I-66	75	121	Strasburg	Washington, D.C. border at Arlington	1958	current	New route
SR 69	3.6	5.8	Austinville	Poplar Camp	1958	current	Formerly SR 81
I-81	325	523	Tennessee state line at Bristol	West Virginia state line near Winchester	1958	current	New route
I-85	69	111	North Carolina state line near Bracey	Petersburg	1958	current	New route
SR 102	8.2	13.2	Three sections between Pocahontas and Bluefield		1958	current	Formerly SR 85

== Former routes ==
Number	Length (mi)	Length (km)	Southern or western terminus	Northern or eastern terminus	Formed	Removed	Notes
SR 64	39	63	St. Paul	Haysi	—	1958	Became SR 63
SR 66	34	55	Clinchport	Castlewood	—	1958	Became SR 65
SR 81	3.6	5.8	Austinville	Poplar Camp	—	1958	Became SR 69
SR 85	8.2	13.2	Three sections between Pocahontas and Bluefield		—	1958	Became SR 102
Former

== Related changes ==
- SR 295 was renumbered to SR 215 in 1961
- SR 195 was renumbered to SR 186 in 1973.
