= Virginia State Route 271 =

State highway in Virginia, United States

State Route 271
- Pouncey Tract Road

Route information
- Maintained by VDOT
- Length: 7.34 mi (11.81 km)
- Existed: 1940–present

Major junctions
- South end: US 250 in Short Pump
- North end: SR 620 / SR 622 in Rockville

Location
- Country: United States
- State: Virginia
- Counties: Henrico, Goochland, Hanover

Highway system
- Virginia Routes; Interstate; US; Primary; Secondary; Byways; History; HOT lanes
| ← SR 270 | → SR 272 |

State Route 271 (SR 271) is a primary state highway in the U.S. state of Virginia. Known as Pouncey Tract Road, the state highway runs 7.34 miles (11.81 km) from U.S. Route 250 (US 250) in Short Pump north to SR 620 and SR 622 in Rockville. A small section of it was first added to the state highway system during 1930, and it gained its current routing and designation by 1940.

== Route description ==
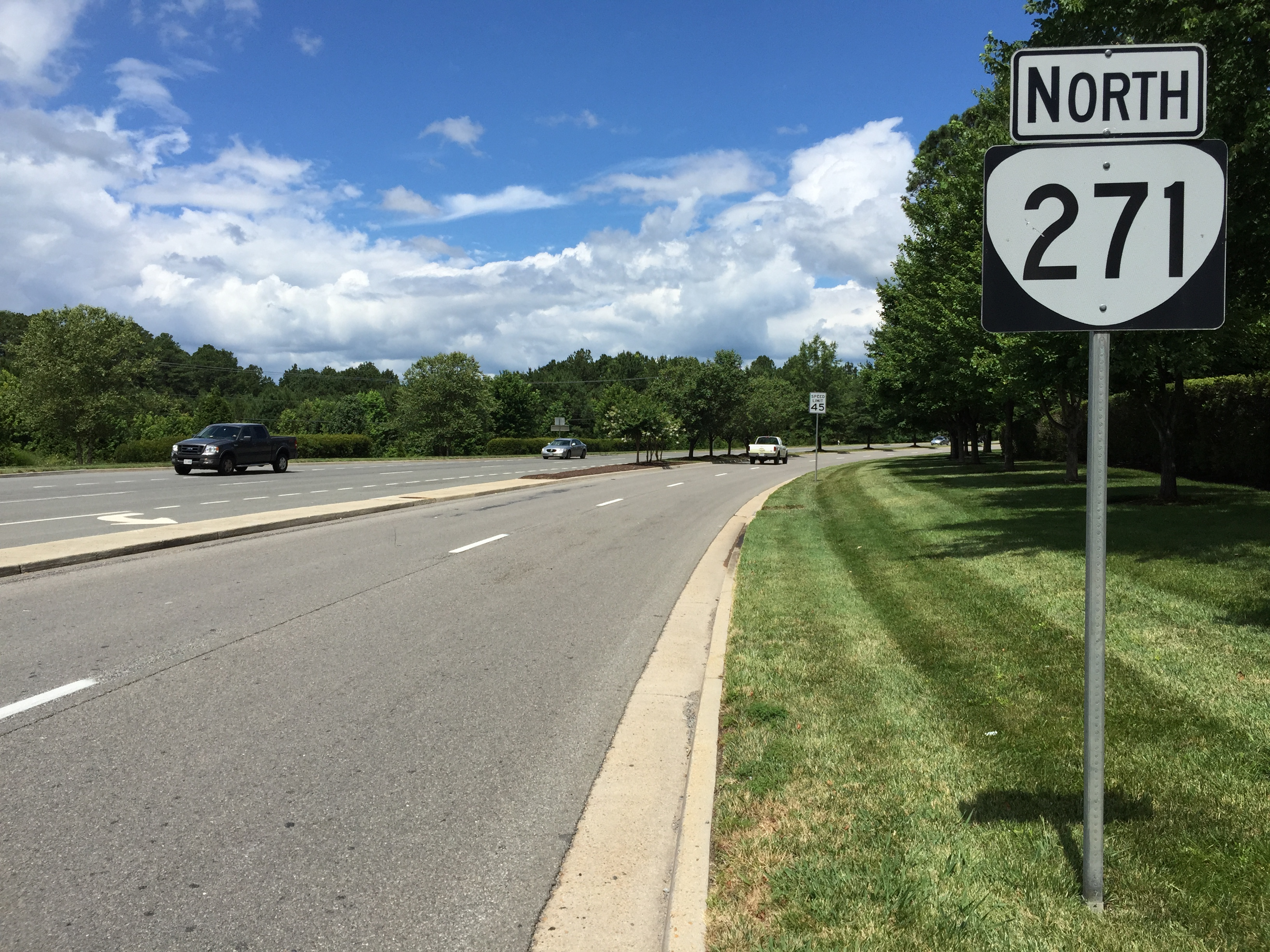
View north along SR 271 at Nuckols Road in Wyndham

SR 271 begins at an intersection with US 250 (Broad Street) in the suburban community of Short Pump in western Henrico County. The road continues south as Pump Road. The state highway heads north as a four-lane divided highway to the east of Short Pump Town Center and crosses over Interstate 64 (I-64) just west of its western interchange with I-295. SR 271 reduces to a two-lane undivided road north of the overpass and passes along the western edge of the suburban community of Wyndham. The road temporarily becomes a four-lane divided highway again by turning left at its perpendicular intersection with Nuckols Road. SR 271 leaves the suburban area as a two-lane road that cuts through the northeastern corner of Goochland County near the headwaters of the Chickahominy River to the east before entering Hanover County. The state highway continues west to its northern terminus at the intersection of SR 620 and SR 622 in the village of Rockville. SR 622 heads south as Rockville Road and north as Walnut Hill Drive; SR 620 heads west as Dogwood Trail Road.

== History ==
In 1930, a portion of what would later become SR 271 was commissioned as State Route 431, running 1.5 miles (2.4 km) northwest from State Route 41 (now US 250) in Short Pump to a point near Rockville. During 1932, the route was extended a total of 5.88 miles (9.46 km) to SR 271's current terminus as part of a larger addition of 27.44 miles (44.2 km) of undesignated roads in Henrico, Goochland, and Hanover Counties to the state highway system. In 1933, it was redesignated State Route 160 as part of that year's state highway renumbering. It received the designation of SR 271 from what is now State Route 84 during the state highway renumbering of 1940, when the latter was renumbered to match with West Virginia Route 84.

== Major intersections ==
| County | Location | mi | km | Destinations | Notes |
|---|---|---|---|---|---|
| Henrico | Short Pump | 0.00 | 0.00 | Pump Road | Southern terminus |
| Henrico | Short Pump | 0.00 | 0.00 | US 250 (Broad Street) | Southern terminus |
| Goochland | No major junctions | | | | |
| Hanover | Hylas | 4.43 | 7.13 | SR 623 (Ashland Road) to US 250 – Ashland | "TO 250" signage only present southbound |
| Hanover | Rockville | 7.34 | 11.81 | SR 620 (Pouncey Tract Road) | Northern terminus |
| Hanover | Rockville | 7.34 | 11.81 | SR 622 (Rockville Road / Walnut Hill Drive) | Northern terminus |
1.000 mi = 1.609 km; 1.000 km = 0.621 mi

| < SR 430 | District 4 State Routes; 1928–1933 | SR 432 > |
