= 1953 New Jersey state highway renumbering =

1953 renumbering of New Jersey highways

This article is part of the highway renumbering series.
Alabama	1928, 1957
Arkansas	1926
California	1964
Colorado	1953, 1968
Connecticut	1932, 1963
Florida	1945
Indiana	1926
Iowa	1926, 1969
Louisiana	1955
Maine	1933
Massachusetts	1933
Minnesota	1934
Missouri	1926
Montana	1932
Nebraska	1926
Nevada	1976
New Jersey	1927, 1953
New Mexico	1926, 1988
New York	1927, 1930
North Carolina	1934, 1937, 1940, 1961
North Dakota	1926
Ohio	1923, 1927, 1962
Pennsylvania	1928, 1961
Puerto Rico	1953
South Carolina	1928, 1937
South Dakota	1927, 1975
Tennessee	1983
Texas	1939, 1990
Utah	1962, 1977
Virginia	1923, 1928, 1933, 1940, 1958
Washington	1964
Wisconsin	1926
Wyoming	1927

On January 1, 1953, the New Jersey Highway Department renumbered many of the State Routes. This renumbering was first proposed in 1951 in order to reduce confusion to motorists. A few rules were followed in deciding what to renumber:

- No state route and U.S. Route could have the same number; this eliminated 1 (which was also eliminated by other criteria), 22, 30, 40 and 46. While Route 1 was broken into several pieces, the other four were renumbered as Routes 59, 69, 70 and 77, respectively. Route 69 later became Route 31 after frequent theft of road signs due to the sexual connotation of the number.
- Concurrencies were highly discouraged; this included U.S. Routes and meant that U.S. Route numbers would now be referred to directly by NJDOT.
- No State Route could have a lettered prefix or suffix unless it was unsigned. (U.S. 9W remained an exception.)
- A State Route that ended at a state border was renumbered to match the number assigned by the adjacent state.
- The New Jersey Turnpike, Garden State Parkway, and Palisades Interstate Parkway were not to have route numbers.

New numbers assigned semi-arbitrarily included 15 and 20 (13-20 were not assigned in the 1927 renumbering), the sequence from 57 to 93, and 152 to 165 for minor routes (continuing from pre-renumbering 151).

In the table, S routes (like S1 and S1A) is shown with the S after the number (like 1S and 1SA) for sorting reasons.

New Route	Old Designation	From	To	Modern Designation	Notes
US 1	local streets	Trenton	Lawrence Township		
US 1	26	Lawrence Township	North Brunswick		
US 1	26S	North Brunswick	Woodbridge Township		
US 1	25	Woodbridge Township	Jersey City		
US 1	1	Jersey City	Ridgefield		
US 1	6	Ridgefield	Fort Lee		
US 1 Alternate	local streets	Trenton	Trenton		
US 1 Business	25	Jersey City	New York City	139	
US 1/9 Truck	25T	Newark	Jersey City		
Route 3	3S	Clifton	East Rutherford		
Route 3	3	East Rutherford	Weehawken		
Route 4	4	Paterson	Fort Lee		
Route 5	5	Ridgefield	Edgewater		
Route 7	7	Jersey City	Nutley		
US 9	4	Cape May	South Amboy		
US 9	35	South Amboy	Woodbridge		
US 9	25	Woodbridge	Fort Lee		
US 9W	1	Fort Lee	Sparkill		
Route 10	10	Ledgewood	West Orange		
Route 11	11	White House	Warrenville		unbuilt and cancelled
Route 12	12	Frenchtown	Flemington		
Route 13	13E	Bay Head	Point Pleasant		
Route 15	6A	Dover	Ross' Corner	15, 181	
Route 16	9	Belleville	Pine Brook	CR 506	
Route 17	17	North Arlington	Mahwah		Was numbered 2 until March 1942
Route 18	28S	Middlesex	Old Bridge	18	
Route 18	28S	Old Bridge	Matawan	CR 516	was signed as TEMP 18 (as this section was cancelled when the Old Bridge to Eatontown freeway was built)
Route 18 (proposed)	18	Old Bridge	Eatontown	18	
Route 20	3	Paterson	Hawthorne	20	
Route 20	3	East Rutherford	Rutherford	120	Sections were planned to connect but never did
Route 21	21	Newark	Paterson		Belleville to Paterson was numbered 19 until 1948
US 22	24	Philipsburg	east of Philipsburg	US 22	
US 22	24-28 Link	east of Philipsburg	Still Valley	US 22	
US 22	28	Still Valley	west of North Branch	US 22, 173, Hunterdon CR 626	
US 22	28-29 Link	west of North Branch	north of Somerville	US 22	
US 22	29	north of Somerville	Newark	US 22	
US 22	28A	?	?	US 22	
US 22 Alternate	local streets	Pennsylvania	Philipsburg	122	
US 22 Alternate	28	Philipsburg	Still Valley	122	
Route 23	23	Montague Township	Verona	23	
Route 24	24	Philipsburg	Penwell	57	
Route 24	24S	Penwell	Hackettstown	57	
Route 24	local roads	Hackettstown	Morristown	CR 517, CR 513, CR 510	
Route 24	24	Morristown	Maplewood	CR 517, CR 513, CR 510	
Route 26	26	North Brunswick	New Brunswick		
Route 27	27	Princeton	Newark		
Route 28	28	west of North Branch	west of Elizabeth		
Route 28	27-28 Link	west of Elizabeth	Elizabeth		
Route 29	29	Trenton	Lambertville		
Route 29	29A	Lambertville	Frenchtown		
US 30	25	Camden	north of Woodlynne		
US 30	45	north of Woodlynne	Woodlynne		US 30 overlaps US 130 here
US 30	43	Woodlynne	Absecon		
US 30	56	Absecon	Atlantic City		
Route 33	33	Trenton	Ocean Grove		
Route 34	34	Brielle	Matawan		
Route 34	4A	Matawan	Cheesequake		
Route 35	37	Seaside Heights	Point Pleasant		
Route 35	35	Point Pleasant	South Amboy		35 overlaps US 9 for a short distance in South Amboy
Route 35	4	South Amboy	Rahway		
Route 36	36	Keyport	Eatontown		
Route 37	37	Lakehurst	Seaside Heights		
Route 38	38	Pennsauken	Wall Township	38, 138	
US 40	local streets	Deepwater	west of Sharptown		
US 40	48	west of Sharptown	Egg Harbor City		
US 40	55	Egg Harbor City	Atlantic City		
Route 41	41	Fairview	Maple Shade		
Route 42	42	Williamstown	Camden		
Route 44	44	Bridgeport	Thorofare		
Route 45	45	Salem	Westville		
US 46	6	Delaware	Fort Lee		
Route 47	49S	Wildwood	South Dennis		
Route 47	49	South Dennis	Millville		
Route 47	47	Millville	Brooklawn		
Route 48	48	Penn's Grove	west of Sharptown		
Route 49	44	Deepwater	Salem		
Route 49	49	Salem	Millville		
Route 49	47	Millville	Tuckahoe		
Route 50	50	Seaville	Egg Harbor City		
Route 52	52	Ocean City	Somer's Point		
Route 53	5N	Morris Plains	Denville		
Route 54	54	Buena	Hammonton		
Route 57	24S	south of Hackettstown	Hackettstown	182	
Route 58	25A	Newark	Harrison	I-280	
Route 59	22	Cranford			
Route 60	new	Verga	Bridgeboro	I-295	route number later recycled to be one from Deepwater to Ocean City that remains unbuilt; it may or may not be built due to opposition
Route 61	1	New York	Jersey City		Became a second section of 440 in the final plan
Route 62	6S	Totowa	Paterson		
Route 63	1S	North Bergen	Fort Lee		
Route 64	31A	Princeton	Hightstown		
Route 65	25B	Newark		Port St, Doremus Ave	
Route 66	33-35 Link	Shrewsbury Township	Neptune Township		
Route 67	1SA	Fort Lee			
Route 68	39S	Mansfield Township	Fort Dix		
Route 69	30	Trenton	Buttzville		Renumbered Route 31 on May 15, 1967, due to sign thefts because of numbering.
Route 70	40	Pennsauken	Laurelton		
Route 70	34	Laurelton	Brielle		
Route 71	4N	Eatontown	Brielle		
Route 72	40S	Four Mile	Ship Bottom		
Route 73	41S	Palmyra	east of Berlin		
Route 74	56N	Laurelton	Mantoloking		unbuilt and cancelled
Route 77	46	Bridgeton	Mullica Hill		
Route 78	44T	Pennsylvania	Williamstown		unbuilt and cancelled
Route 79	4A	Freehold	Matawan		
Route 80	44S	Brooklawn	Ellisburg		unbuilt and cancelled
Route 81	new	Ledgewood	Lafayette		unbuilt and cancelled
Route 82	24S	Springfield Township	Union		
Route 83	49	South Dennis	Clermont		
Route 84	84	Sussex	New York	284	
Route 85	4SC	Cape May Point	Cold Spring		unbuilt and cancelled due to Route 162
Route 87	4SA	Atlantic City	Brigantine		
Route 88	35	Lakewood	Point Pleasant		
Route 89	43S	Germania	Northfield		unbuilt and cancelled
Route 91	26A	North Brunswick	New Brunswick		
Route 92	N/A?	Princeton	Hightstown		proposed route later shifted north to New Jersey Turnpike in Jamesburg to Rocky Hill, but was cancelled entirely due to environmental problems.
Route 93	5S	Ridgefield	Palisades Park		
Route 94	8	Columbia	north of Newton		
Route 94	31	north of Newton	New York		
US 130	44	Deepwater	Bridgeport		
US 130	new alignment	Bridgeport	Thorofare		
US 130	44	Thorofare	Westville		
US 130	45	Westville	Woodlynne		US 130 overlapped US 30 for a short time in Woodlynne.
US 130	25	Woodlynne	New Brunswick		
Route 151	Camden		151	S 10th and 11th St	
Route 152	Trenton		new	29	
Route 153	Secaucus		3 (old route)	Paterson Plank Rd	
Route 154	Haddonfield	northeast of Haddonfield	41 (old bypass)		
Route 155	Cinnaminson	Palmyra	41SN	Cinnaminson Ave	
Route 156	Yardville		US 130 (old route)		
Route 157	Absecon		4S		
Route 158	Newark	Harrison	25AD	Rector Street, Essex Street; bridge demolished	
Route 159	Montville	Fairfield	6M		
Route 160	South of White Horse		unknown	Mission Rd	
Route 161	3S Spur	Clifton			
Route 162	new	Lower Township			Not taken over by the state until 1969.
Route 163	6 (old route)	Knowlton Township			
Route 164	100S	Elizabeth			
Route 165	29 (old route)	Lambertville		29	
US 202	29S	Pennsylvania	Lambertville		
US 202	29	Lambertville	Raritan		
US 202	32	Lambertville	Wayne		
US 202	local roads	Wayne	New York		
US 206	39	Hammonton	White Horse		
US 206	37	White Horse	Trenton		
US 206	local streets	Trenton			
US 206	27	Trenton	Princeton		
US 206	31	Princeton	Newton		
US 206	31S	Newton	Montague		
Route 208	4SB	Fair Lawn	Oakland		
Route 303	55N	Teaneck	Northvale		
US 322	44S, 51, local roads, 42, 48	Bridgeport	McKee City		
Route 413	25S	Burlington			
Route 439	28	New York	Route 28 Elizabeth		
Route 439	24	Route 28 in Elizabeth	Route 82 in Elizabeth		
Route 439	North Ave Link	Route 82 in Elizabeth	Route 27 in Elizabeth		
Route 440	4S	west of Woodbridge Township	New York		connected by NY 440
Route 444	4 Parkway	New York	Cape May		unsigned
Route 444R	4 Parkway Exit 117	south of Keyport	Keyport	4 Parkway Exit 117	decommissioned in 2006
Route 444S	4 Parkway Exit 105	west of Eatontown	Eatontown		unsigned
Route 445	Palisades Interstate Parkway	New York	Fort Lee		unsigned
Route 445S	Palisades Interstate Parkway Spur	Route 445 in Fort Lee	US 9W in Fort Lee		unsigned
Route 700	100	Fort Lee	New Brunswick		unsigned
Route 700	300	New Brunswick	Deepwater		unsigned
local roads	2N	Lyndhurst	Nutley		now Page and Park Avenue
unbuilt and cancelled	101	Kearny	Hackensack		
unbuilt and cancelled	101S	Hackensack	New York		

== See also ==
- 1927 New Jersey state highway renumbering
