= 1932 state highway renumbering (Connecticut) =

This article is part of the highway renumbering series.
Alabama	1928, 1957
Arkansas	1926
California	1964
Colorado	1953, 1968
Connecticut	1932, 1963
Florida	1945
Indiana	1926
Iowa	1926, 1969
Louisiana	1955
Maine	1933
Massachusetts	1933
Minnesota	1934
Missouri	1926
Montana	1932
Nebraska	1926
Nevada	1976
New Jersey	1927, 1953
New Mexico	1926, 1988
New York	1927, 1930
North Carolina	1934, 1937, 1940, 1961
North Dakota	1926
Ohio	1923, 1927, 1962
Pennsylvania	1928, 1961
Puerto Rico	1953
South Carolina	1928, 1937
South Dakota	1927, 1975
Tennessee	1983
Texas	1939, 1990
Utah	1962, 1977
Virginia	1923, 1928, 1933, 1940, 1958
Washington	1964
Wisconsin	1926
Wyoming	1927

In 1932, the Highway Department of the U.S. state of Connecticut (now known as the Connecticut Department of Transportation) decided to completely renumber all its state highways. The only exceptions were the U.S. Highways and some of the New England Interstate Routes. Between 1922 and 1932, Connecticut used a state highway numbering system shared with the other New England states. Major inter-state trunk routes used numbers in the 1-99 range, primary intrastate highways used numbers in the 100-299 range, and secondary state highways used numbers in the 300+ range.

In 1926, at the behest of the American Association of State Highway Officials, four of the nine New England Interstate Routes that passed through Connecticut became U.S. Routes. At this time, the adjacent states of Massachusetts and Rhode Island abandoned the New England highway numbering system but Connecticut still used it for several more years. This led to a situation where U.S. Routes were co-signed with New England Routes (in particular U.S. Route 5/New England Route 2 and U.S. Route 6/New England Route 3).

In 1932, the Highway Department decided to abandon the New England numbering system as well by completely reorganizing the state highway system. The renumbering completely altered the previously existing state highway numbers. In addition, not only were the highways renumbered, some old state highways were combined, some were split, some were deleted, and some new ones were also created.

== Highways in 1932 ==
The table below lists the highways that were created in the 1932 renumbering, indicating which old state highways they were created from, and their current status:

1932 Route	Pre-1932 State Highway number(s)	Current designation	Notes
2	NE-17 east of Hartford	Route 2	Hartford to Norwich upgraded to expressway. Portions of old surface alignment are now unsigned state roads.
4	SH 123 (Cornwall-Canton), SH 138 (Canton-Farmington)	Route 4	
8	NE-8	Route 110, Route 8	Upgraded to expressway with a different alignment south of Shelton. Portions of old surface alignment are now unsigned state roads.
9	NE-10 south of Granby	Route 154, Route 99, Route 189	Upgraded to expressway with a different alignment north of Middletown (see Route 9).
10	SH 118 (New Haven-Milldale), NE-3 (Milldale-Farmington), SH 116 (Farmington-Granby), NE-10 north of Granby	Route 10	
12	NE-32 (Groton-Norwich), NE-12 north of Norwich	Route 12	
14	NE-3 (Woodbury-Milldale), SH 111 (Milldale-Willimantic), SH 141 (Willimantic-Plainfield), SH 103 (Plainfield-RI)	Route 64, Route 322, Route 66, Route 14	West of Willimantic was renumbered to US 6A in 1941.
15	SH 114 (New Haven-Durham), SH 112 (Durham-Middletown), SH 104 (Portland-Glastonbury), NE-17 (Glastonbury-East Hartford), SH 313 (East Hartford-Talcotville), SH 107 (Talcotville-Rockville), SH 166 (Rockville-Stafford Springs), SH 105 (Stafford Springs-MA)	Route 17, Route 30, Route 190	
19	Original alignment of NE-32 in Stafford	Route 19	
20	SH 133 (Winsted-Granby), SH 343 (East Granby-Windsor Locks), SH 105 (Enfield-Stafford Springs)	Route 20, Route 190	
25	SH 122 (Bridgeport-Newtown), SH 156 (Newtown-Brookfield), SH 182 (Brookfield-Bridgewater), SH 125 (Bridgewater-New Milford), SH 128 (New Milford-Torrington)	Main Street, Route 25, Route 133, Route 67, U.S. Route 202	Upgraded to expressway between Bridgeport and Trumbull.
29	SH 302 (Darien-NY)	Route 124	
32	NE-12 (New London-Norwich), NE-32 (Norwich-Stafford Springs), SH 334 (Stafford Springs-MA)	Route 32	
33	SH 176 (Westport-Wilton), SH 304 (Wilton-Ridgefield), SH 143 (Ridgefield-NY)	Route 33, Route 116	
34	SH 117 (New Haven-Newtown)	Route 34	
35	NE-3 (NY line to US 7 near Ridgefield)	Route 35	
37	SH 136 (Danbury-Sherman), SH 131 (Sherman to US 7)	Route 37	
39	SH 194 (New Fairfield-Sherman), SH 136 (Sherman-Gaylordsville)	Route 39	
41	NE-4 (Sharon-MA)	Route 41	
43	SH 132 (Cornwall-South Canaan)	Route 43, Route 63	
45	SH 152 (New Preston-Cornwall Bridge)	Route 45	
47	SH 154 (Woodbury-New Preston)	Route 47	
49	SH 312 (Torrington-Norfolk)	Route 272	
53	(Georgetown-Danbury)	Route 53	
55	(NY line to Gaylordsville)	Route 55	
57	(Westport-Weston), SH 158 (Weston-Newtown)	Route 57, Newtown Turnpike	
58	SH 124 (Bridgeport-Danbury)	Route 58, Route 302, Route 53	
59	SH 306 (Bridgeport-Monroe)	Route 59	
61	SH 130 (Woodbury-Goshen)	Route 61, Route 63	
63	SH 120 (Woodbridge-Naugatuck), SH 341 (Naugatuck to NE-3), (NE-3 to Watertown), (Watertown-Morris)	Route 63	
65	SH 316 (Bridgeport-Shelton)	Route 8	Original surface alignment is now an unsigned state road.
67	SH 120 (New Haven-Woodbridge), SH 147 (Woodbridge-Southbury), SH 125 (Southbury-Bridgewater)	Route 63, Route 67	
68	SH 325 (Naugatuck-Cheshire)	Route 68	
69	SH 348 (Bethany-Waterbury)	Route 69	Extended by 1938 along old Route 119/SH 172 (Waterbury-Bristol).
70	SH 323 (Waterbury-Cheshire), SH 325 (Cheshire-Meriden)	East Main Street, Route 70	
71	SH 113 (New Britain-Hartford)	Route 71, Route 173, New Britain Avenue	West Hartford-Hartford became US 6A in 1934.
72	SH 346 (Middletown-Cromwell), SH 319 (Cromwell-Berlin), SH 162 (Berlin-New Britain), SH 113 (New Britain-Plainville)	Route 3, Route 372	
73	SH 339 (Waterbury-Watertown)	Route 73	
74	SH 107 (Rockville-Ashford)	Route 74	
75	SH 362 (Windsor-Suffield), SH 110 (Suffield-MA line)	Route 75	
77	SH 112 (Durham-Guilford)	Route 77	
79	SH 190 (Durham-Madison)	Route 79	
80	SH 135 (New Haven-North Branford), SH 140 (North Branford-North Guilford), (North Guilford-Killingworth), SH 175 (Killingworth-Deep River)	Route 80	
81	SH 106 (Clinton-Higganum)	Route 81	

== See also ==
- List of state routes in Connecticut
