= 1955 Louisiana Highway renumbering =

Reclassification of highways

This article is part of the highway renumbering series.
| Alabama | 1928, 1957 |
| Arkansas | 1926 |
| California | 1964 |
| Colorado | 1953, 1968 |
| Connecticut | 1932, 1963 |
| Florida | 1945 |
| Indiana | 1926 |
| Iowa | 1926, 1969 |
| Louisiana | 1955 |
| Maine | 1933 |
| Massachusetts | 1933 |
| Minnesota | 1934 |
| Missouri | 1926 |
| Montana | 1932 |
| Nebraska | 1926 |
| Nevada | 1976 |
| New Jersey | 1927, 1953 |
| New Mexico | 1926, 1988 |
| New York | 1927, 1930 |
| North Carolina | 1934, 1937, 1940, 1961 |
| North Dakota | 1926 |
| Ohio | 1923, 1927, 1962 |
| Pennsylvania | 1928, 1961 |
| Puerto Rico | 1953 |
| South Carolina | 1928, 1937 |
| South Dakota | 1927, 1975 |
| Tennessee | 1983 |
| Texas | 1939, 1990 |
| Utah | 1962, 1977 |
| Virginia | 1923, 1928, 1933, 1940, 1958 |
| Washington | 1964 |
| Wisconsin | 1926 |
| Wyoming | 1927 |

In 1955, Louisiana passed a law that undertook a comprehensive revision to the state highway classification and numbering system. The new system designated roads by importance to travel patterns and rectified the previous numbering system under new unified designations.

== History ==
Highway numbers in Louisiana first appeared in 1921, per Act 95 of the 1921 Special Session of the Louisiana Legislature. Routes 1 through 98 were defined that year. These first 98 routes remained consistent throughout the pre-1955 era. The lowest numbered routes seem to have followed major auto trails; for instance, LA 1 was the Jefferson Highway, LA 2 was the Old Spanish Trail, etc. The remainder of the numbering system seemed to work on a lower-number, higher-order principle, with some clustering; for instance, LA 61 and 62 both existed in St. Bernard Parish. When US highways were added in 1926, the US designations were simply overlaid over the preexisting state route (SR) designations in a method similar to modern Georgia (the state route was included in signage as well).

Other routes were added as time went on, numbered in consecutive fashion, starting with LA 99 in 1924. By 1926 there were 162 defined routes; by 1929, 490. The number of routes increased precipitously during the Huey Long era, with 1325 routes defined by 1930 and more to come. A few routes were given "half" numbers, such as LA 99½ and LA 1315½, for reasons perhaps related to numerical duplications in the official legal descriptions of the routes. (LA 99½, which had been jokingly referred to as "the left lane of 100," was redesignated in the pre-1955 era, as LA 2203.)

The pre-1955 system eventually reached the 22xx numeric range (or so) at its zenith. There were also "C-xxxx" roads, the purpose of which is unclear. All roads were seemingly numbered in the order that they were taken into the system, which led to anarchy, inconsistency, and disorder prevailing among the system of numbered routes. Major through routes were often divided up into several different route designations, and the routing of several primary marked routes (such as the old LA 1 and LA 30) came to make little sense from a traffic flow perspective.

Route designations were somewhat sacrosanct; apparently they could only be rerouted to take advantage of minor alignment shifts along the same general route. Former route segments retained the same number with a letter suffix added, starting with "D" and increasing with other bypassed segments in the same area. For example, bypassed LA 7 west of Hammond (current LA 1040) became LA 7D (or 7-D) while a bypassed segment east of Hammond (current LA 1067) became LA 7E (or 7-E). However, the major routes by and large retained consistent numbers despite the lack of major reroutings. Suffixes were also used in a way similar to the "spur" routes in the present system.

Unlike today's system, clustering of the higher numbers seems to have occurred only when multiple routes in an area were added at the same time. For example, LA 1225 to 1251 all existed within Jefferson Parish and were designated by the same act of legislature in 1930. Otherwise, routes appear to have been numbered sequentially as they were added to the system.

Not all numbers were assigned to existing roads; some roads were merely "projected", which is to say they were only lines on paper. State roads were often improved only "if funds were available." This resulted in routes being nonexistent in the field, in whole or in part, or signed along routes that sometimes differed from their legal description. LA 33 was always discontinuous as ten miles of the New Orleans–Hammond Highway was never completed as planned through St. John the Baptist and St. Charles Parishes. LA 1 did not match its legal description until 1928 when the Jefferson Highway was completed between Shrewsbury and New Orleans.

== Renumbering ==
Post-war efforts to make improvements to Louisiana's unorganized highway-numbering system reached fruition at the 1955 legislative session, where a comprehensive highway bill was passed that year and enacted into law. The new law effected a comprehensive revision of state highway classification and numbering, in order to designate roads by importance to travel patterns and to rectify the confusing numbering system by marking primary travel routes under unified designations.

One element of the highway reform lobby's efforts that was left out of the 1955 highway law was a proposal to reduce the amount of state-maintained mileage, mainly by shedding the many miles of minor and local service roads the state had accumulated over the years for political and other reasons. According to one proposal by the Louisiana Legislative Council, the 16,000 miles (26,000 km) or so which existed in the state system at the time would have been ultimately reduced to around 9,000 miles (14,000 km) through the turnback of all but the most important farm-to-market roads. Thus to this day, Louisiana retains an inordinately large state highway system which continues to contain many miles of roads that would be otherwise locally maintained in other states. Louisiana's state highway system ranks 10th nationally as a proportion of all road miles in the state.

The 1955 renumbering renumbered all routes based on an A-B-C system of route classification: A was primary, B secondary, and C farm-to-market. The A routes mainly comprised one and two digit highways. The B routes primarily comprised three digit routes below 300. All routes 300 through 1241, along with parts or all of a very few lower-numbered routes, were classified C routes. Numerical clustering was and is still apparent in the ranks of routes 300 and up (excluding 3xxx routes), especially with routes 700 and above. The A and B "primary" route range was 1 to 185. No 2xx numbers were used; this range may have been intended as an expansion area for future primary route designations (this was never done). LA 191 was added around 1980 as the Toledo Bend Scenic Drive and is the only primary route designation to be added after 1955.

Odd numbers in 1955 and thereafter were assigned to cardinal north–south routes and even numbers to east–west routes as in the federal U.S. and Interstate highway systems; this practice is consistently adhered to in primary routes (lower numbers), but anomalies have occurred in the four-digit numbers. Prior to 1955 the numbering pattern was essentially the obverse, meaning that almost all the numbers changed in 1955.

The 1955 route redesignations took effect on June 30 of 1955.

== Post-1955 numbering practices ==
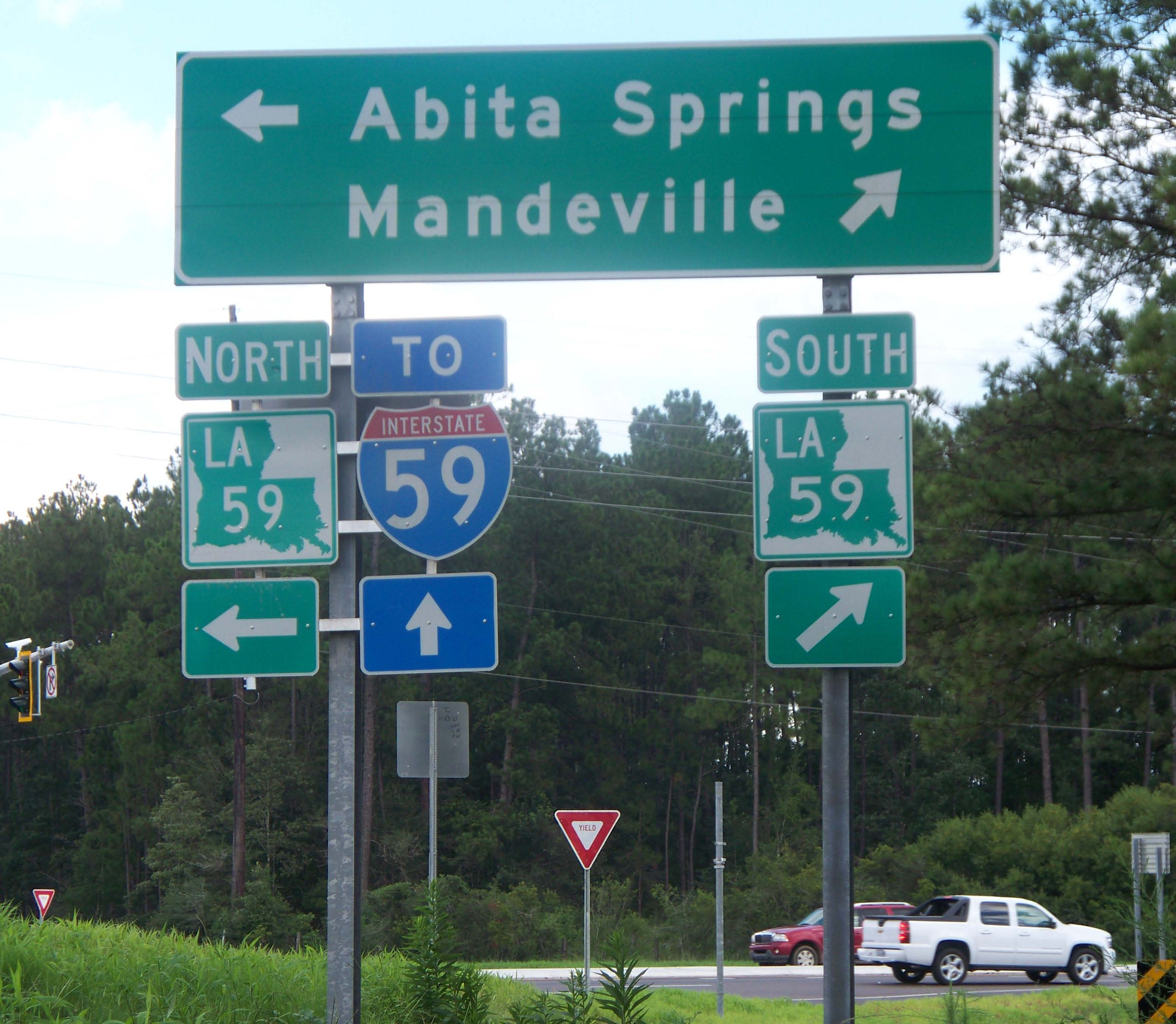
This sign tells motorists that LA 59 goes to Mandeville and Abita Springs, but that motorists wanting I-59 (some 20 miles farther east) should continue straight onto I-12 eastbound.

3xxx designations were given to all new post-1955 SRs, and were the only new type designations, until around the year 2000 when 12xx designations began to be assigned to new routes, starting with 1242 and working up (1241 is the highest-designated 1955 route). State routes in any range can and have been removed from the system, and there are many corresponding gaps in the numerical sequence. Numbers of deleted routes are not recycled into new routes as they are in other states; generally a new 12xx number is assigned when a new number is needed. Many newer route designations are given to roads long having been on the state rolls, but which have been severed or isolated from its former designation by newer construction. Despite the high numbers, some roadways in the 3XXX series are major, heavily trafficked thoroughfares; an example is LA 3132, a connector between I-20 and I-49 in Shreveport—and a rare example, in Louisiana, of a state highway built in the multilane, divided, access-fully-controlled format typical of interstate highways.

Official US highway-state highway number duplications have been disallowed since 1955, but interstate-state highway duplications are permitted, and all interstate routes except 210 and 220 are duplicated in the rolls of state highway numbers. Most state highways with the same numbers as interstates are a comfortable distance away, with two exceptions: LA 59 and I-59, which exist within 20 miles (32 km) of each other in St. Tammany Parish, and which both intersect I-12; and LA 10 and I-10, which both flow east–west across south Louisiana. The confusion between LA 59 and I-59 became so substantial on the eastbound concourse of I-12 that Louisiana Department of Transportation and Development has posted "TO I-59" signs at the bottom of the eastbound exit ramp from I-12 at LA 59 to redirect, back to I-12 eastbound, motorists who confuse LA 59 as I-59.

== "Hyphenated" routes ==
The Louisiana state highway system's most ubiquitous and unique anachronism is the infamous "hyphenated" routes. These routes were created with the 1955 renumbering, and are a legacy of the assumption by the state through the years of many otherwise local streets in cities and towns throughout the state. The state-maintained city streets were/are often short sections of road, usually interconnected with other state-maintained local streets in the vicinity. Because of the interconnectedness of these state-maintained streets, as well as their close proximity and extremely short length, it was decided for practical purposes not to separately number each and every street in a town as a separate state route. Instead, each street was deemed a 'section' of a larger whole, with the aggregate comprising a single state highway; this becomes obvious when reading the 1955 statute that defines the newly redesignated state highways. The separate sections are denoted by numbers in the statute, which correspond in signage to the last digit in a hyphenated route number. For example, LA 560-3 is section 3 of LA 560.

Similar as it may sound, this method is different from state route legislative definitions in states such as California, where state routes are often defined as existing in disjoint sections; but in these cases, there is often a linear continuity of a route through cosigning or implied connections made via other routes. In Louisiana's case, the base "route" usually resembles a web-like or disconnected pattern; thus the distinction between sections in signage—or else there would be multiple, often intersecting routes with the same number, and real confusion would ensue.

Over the years many of these hyphenated state routes have been returned to local control, thus deleting parts of, or entire "families" of, hyphenated routes. For example, the LA 466 family originally had 17 sections, all within the city of Gretna in Jefferson Parish. Most of these sections have been turned back to local control; the remaining section lost its "hyphen" and was renumbered as plain LA 466. In Baton Rouge, the LA 950 family had 17 sections; all are extinct. Some families still survive intact, such as the six sections of the LA 830 family in Bastrop. A few have been renumbered, almost always to 3000-series routes: LA 3155 in Metairie was once LA 611–13, and former portions of LA 611-3 and 611-4 that were severed from the rest of their routes were redesignated LA 3261 and LA 3262, respectively.

Invariably, hyphenated routes are short, local streets that seemingly serve no state-level purpose whatsoever; many are dead ends, residential side streets, etc., and sometimes end in arbitrary places. The majority of these routes can be found in urbanized areas, though there are a few that exist in rural surroundings. All of the hyphenated routes in the nomenclature are found among the original secondary SR system (routes 300 to 1241). There are no 3000-series hyphenates because all hyphenates were created with the 1955 renumbering (the 3xxx routes were later additions/renumberings).
