= 1926 Iowa highway renumbering =

Highway renumbering

This article is part of the highway renumbering series.
Alabama	1928, 1957
Arkansas	1926
California	1964
Colorado	1953, 1968
Connecticut	1932, 1963
Florida	1945
Indiana	1926
Iowa	1926, 1969
Louisiana	1955
Maine	1933
Massachusetts	1933
Minnesota	1934
Missouri	1926
Montana	1932
Nebraska	1926
Nevada	1976
New Jersey	1927, 1953
New Mexico	1988
New York	1927, 1930
North Carolina	1934, 1937, 1940, 1961
Ohio	1923, 1927, 1962
Pennsylvania	1928, 1961
Puerto Rico	1953
South Carolina	1928, 1937
South Dakota	1927, 1975
Tennessee	1983
Texas	1939
Utah	1962, 1977
Virginia	1923, 1928, 1933, 1940, 1958
Washington	1964
Wisconsin	1926
Wyoming	1927

In late 1925, the Iowa State Highway Commission, now known as the Iowa Department of Transportation, announced plans to renumber several state highways. The changes to the highway system were a result of the creation of the United States Numbered Highway System. The new U.S. Highways replaced several of the state's primary roads and other routes were renumbered in order to eliminate driver confusion between the two systems. As the new highways were being signed, Iowa's state highways were given a new circular route marker. Previously, the primary road number was stenciled in black onto a telegraph pole over a band of yellow paint.

== Background ==
Jefferson Highway

Primary Road No. 1

U.S. Highway 65

In the early days of the automobile, when people still traveled cross-country predominantly by train, auto clubs were created to promote traveling by automobile. These auto clubs would collect dues from cities and in return, they would create an auto trail, such as the Lincoln Highway and Jefferson Highway, and route traffic through those cities. The clubs would then mark the route by painting telegraph poles with the colors and logos of their association. Often, the trails were not the most direct ways to travel between places and as a result, competing auto clubs would spring up to divert traffic from other routes. More often than not, the auto clubs were more interested in collecting dues than improving the roads upon which their trails lay.

Starting in 1920, the Iowa State Highway Commission began marking these auto trails with primary road numbers in order to facilitate wayfinding. This was brought on by the success of a 1917 state law passed in neighboring Wisconsin that created a 5,000-mile (8,000 km) numbered state highway system complete with route markers to replace the informal trail system. In Iowa, however, the route numbers did not replace the trail system; they were applied in addition to the trail names; e.g. the Primary Road No. 6 number was applied to the Lincoln Highway. Route numbers were selected in such a way that they corresponded to route numbers that were used in neighboring states. All towns with populations over 1000 residents were connected to the primary road system. Routes were signified on telegraph poles by a painted yellow stripe upon which the outline of Iowa with "Primary Road" and the route number were stenciled in black.

By 1924, the state highway commissioned had registered 64 named auto trails. Each of these auto trails were sponsored by dues-collecting associations that produced maps and other promotional materials for their routes. Confusion for the traveler reigned supreme. Nationally, the Bureau of Public Road Engineers, with approval from the American Association of State Highway Officials, began to create a national system of interstate highways. Their original plan was for a system covering 75,884 miles (122,123 km), 3,000 miles (4,800 km) of which were to be in Iowa. Several routes in the state would be renumbered to comply with the new interstate system; No. 6 along the Lincoln Highway would change to U.S. Highway 30. Route renumbering had a cascading effect as the state highway commission had a policy of reducing confusion by not duplicating route numbers. Since No. 30 was in use in northwest Iowa, that road was renumbered Iowa Highway 140.

The highway commission had planned for route markers to be changed over to the new route numbers by July 1, 1926, however, this was not the case. In Davenport, for instance, signs for the new U.S. Highways were installed in October 1926. Property owners thought the new signs were gaudy and did a disservice to the beauty of their streetscapes. Complains were lodged to local auto clubs, but since this was a state project, the auto clubs deflected any responsibility.

While the efficiency of wayfinding was greatly improved by the addition of route numbers, motor club officials wished for the names of their highways to not be forgotten. Charles M. Hayes of the Chicago Motor Club urged people to use a hybrid system of route numbers and names in order to preserve the historical significance and sentimental value of the routes. Hayes liked the removal of trail names to railroad engineers numbering train routes while the public calls the routes by their names. Hayes got his wish as the automobile associations disbanded, motorists continued to refer to the routes with their trail names.

== New routes ==
Number	Length (mi) (Note: Route mileage is determined by comparing the 1927 and 1932 state highway maps. (Note: 1932 was the first year that Iowa state highway maps showed route mileage.))	Length (km)	Southern or western terminus	Northern or eastern terminus	Formed	Removed	Notes (Note: The 1926 Iowa state highway map was published before route changes took place. Route changes are shown by comparing the 1926 and 1927 Iowa state highway maps.)
Iowa 1	98	158	Iowa 3 near Keosauqua	US 161 in Iowa City	1926	current	Formerly No. 11
Iowa 6	104	167	Route 5 near Cincinnati	US 32 in Des Moines	1926	1931	Formerly No. 17 and No. 59
Iowa 8	14	23	Iowa 59 in Traer	US 218 near Garrison	1926	current	Formerly No. 58
Iowa 16	238	383	Route 29 near Redding	TH 5 near Ledyard	1926	1930	Formerly No. 15, No. 25, No. 17, No. 90, and No. 16
US 18	287	462	US 75 near Hull	US 18 at McGregor	1926	current	Formerly No. 19
US 20	331	533	US 20 at Sioux City	US 20 at Dubuque	1926	current	Formerly No. 5 and No. 23
Iowa 22	24	39	Iowa 38 near Muscatine	US 61 in Davenport	1926	current	Formerly No. 2
Iowa 23	5	8.0	Route 15 south of Milton	Iowa 3 at Milton	1926	1968	Formerly No. 11
Iowa 25	68	109	US 34 at Creston	US 30 near Scranton	1926	current	Formerly No. 16
Iowa 28	19	31	Iowa 24 at Martensdale	US 32 / Iowa 7 in Des Moines	1926	current	Formerly No. 15
US 30	369	594	US 30 / US 75 at Council Bluffs	US 30 at Clinton	1926	current	Formerly No. 6
US 32	322	518	US 30 / US 75 at Council Bluffs	US 32 at Davenport	1926	1931	Formerly No. 7 and No. 2; now US 6
US 34	283	455	US 30 / US 75 at Council Bluffs	US 34 at Burlington	1926	current	Formerly No. 8
Iowa 40	4	6.4	Allerton	Iowa 3 north of Allerton	1926	2003	Formerly No. 14
US 53	123	198	US 20 / US 61 at Dubuque	US 53 near Burr Oak	1926	1926	Formerly No. 20; became US 55 before highway was signed
Iowa 53	3	4.8	Iowa 10 near Clarksville	Clarksville	1926	1949	Formerly No. 55
US 55	123	198	US 20 / US 61 at Dubuque	US 55 near Burr Oak	1926	1934	Formerly US 53; now US 52
US 61	201	323	US 61 at Keokuk	US 61 near Dubuque	1926	current	Formerly No. 20
US 63	129	208	US 63 south of Bloomfield	US 32 in Des Moines	1926	current	Formerly No. 2, No. 24, and No. 13
US 65	242	389	US 65 south of Leon	US 65 north of Northwood	1926	current	Formerly No. 1 and No. 3
US 69	20	32	US 69 south of Leon	US 65 at Leon	1926	current	Formerly No. 1
US 71	250	400	US 71 at Braddyville	US 71 north of Spirit Lake	1926	current	Formerly No. 4, No. 23, and No. 18
US 75	111	179	US 30 / US 75 at Council Bluffs	US 75 north of Rock Rapids	1926	current	Formerly No. 22 and No. 12
Iowa 90	16	26	Iowa 14 at Grundy Center	Iowa 59 near Voorhies	1926	1932	Formerly No. 58
Iowa 136	33	53	US 61 near Delmar	US 30 in Lyons	1926	current	Formerly No. 61
Iowa 137	21	34	US 34 at Lucas	US 65 near Indianola	1926	1934	Formerly No. 65
Iowa 138	3	4.8	Iowa 3 near Mystic	Mystic	1926	1973	Formerly No. 69
Iowa 139	21	34	US 161 in Iowa City	Iowa 38 near Rochester	1926	1929	Formerly No. 74
Iowa 140	25	40	US 20 at Moville	Iowa 5 at Remsen	1926	current	Formerly No. 30
Iowa 141	68	109	South Dakota state line at Sioux City	Iowa 4 at Denison	1926	current	Formerly No. 34
Iowa 142	3	4.8	Moulton	Iowa 3 near Moulton	1926	1968	Formerly No. 71
Iowa 143	2	3.2	Iowa 5 near Marcus	Marcus	1926	current	Formerly No. 75
Iowa 144	18	29	US 30 at Grand Junction	Iowa 47 near Gowrie	1926	current	Formerly No. 16
Iowa 145	5	8.0	Iowa 5 near Cleghorn	Cleghorn	1926	1931	Formerly No. 32
Iowa 146	24	39	Iowa 59 in New Sharon	US 32 in Grinnell	1926	current	Formerly No. 63
Iowa 147	13	21	Iowa 14 near Rockford	US 18 near Nora Springs	1926	2003	Formerly No. 53
Iowa 148	32	51	Missouri state line south of Bedford	US 34 at Corning	1926	current	Formerly No. 16
Iowa 149	61	98	US 63 near Hedrick	US 32 at South Amana	1926	current	Formerly No. 13
Iowa 150	19	31	US 32 at Homestead	US 30 near Cedar Rapids	1926	1930	Formerly No. 13
Iowa 151	13	21	US 71 at Auburn	Iowa 17 near Lake City	1926	1938	Formerly No. 35
Iowa 152	2	3.2	US 34 near Murray	Murray	1926	1980	Formerly No. 8
US 161	195	314	US 61 at Keokuk	US 61 at Key West	1926	1938	Formerly No. 28 and No. 40; now US 218 and US 151
US 218	139	224	US 30 south of Vinton	US 218 near Mona	1926	current	Formerly No. 40
Former

== Former primary roads ==
Number	Length (mi)	Length (km)	Southern or western terminus	Northern or eastern terminus	Route name	Formed	Removed	Notes
No. 1	236	380	Missouri state line near Lamoni	Minnesota state line near Northwood	Jefferson Highway	1920	1926	Became US 65
No. 6	369	594	Nebraska state line at Council Bluffs	Illinois state line at Clinton	Lincoln Highway	1920	1926	Became US 30
No. 8	283	455	No. 6 in Council Bluffs	Illinois state line at Burlington	Blue Grass Route	1920	1926	Became US 34
No. 16	255	410	Missouri state line south of Bedford	Minnesota state line near Ledyard		1920	1926	Became Iowa 148, US 34, Iowa 25, US 30, Iowa 47, Iowa 144, and Iowa 16
No. 18	148	238	Missouri state line at Braddyville	No. 23 at Sac City	M.C. Trail	1920	1926	Became US 71
No. 20	324	521	Illinois state line at Keokuk	Minnesota state line near Burr Oak	Mississippi Valley Highway	1920	1926	Became US 61 and US 55
No. 22	34	55	No. 5 at Le Mars	Minnesota state line north of Rock Rapids	King of Trails	1920	1926	Became US 75
No. 23	130	210	South Dakota state line at Sioux City	No. 16 at Fort Dodge	Hawkeye Cut-Off	1920	1926	Became US 20
No. 25	20	32	No. 15 / No. 24 at Winterset	No. 2 / No. 17 at Adel		1920	1926	Became Iowa 16
No. 28	72	116	No. 6 / No. 11 in Cedar Rapids	No. 5 / No. 20 in Dubuque	Red X Route	1920	1926	Became US 161
No. 30	25	40	No. 23 at Moville	No. 5 at Remsen		1920	1926	Became Iowa 140
No. 32	5	8.0	No. 5 near Cleghorn	Cleghorn		1920	1926	Became Iowa 145
No. 34	68	109	No. 4 at Denison	No. 12 at Sioux City	Dension–Sioux City Cut-Off	1920	1926	Became Iowa 141
No. 40	262	422	No. 20 in Keokuk	Minnesota state line near Mona	Red Ball Route	1920	1926	Became US 161, US 30, and US 218
No. 53	13	21	No. 14 near Rockford	No. 19 near Nora Springs		1920	1926	Became Iowa 147
No. 55	3	4.8	No. 10 near Clarksville	Clarksville		1920	1926	Became Iowa 53
No. 61	73	117	No. 28 at Anamosa	No. 6 in Lyons	Lincoln Hawkeye Pike	1920	1926	Became Iowa 117 and Iowa 136
No. 63	24	39	No. 59 in New Sharon	No. 7 in Grinnell		1920	1926	Became Iowa 146
No. 65	21	34	No. 8 at Lucas	No. 1 south of Indianola		1920	1926	Became Iowa 137
No. 69	3	4.8	No. 3 near Mystic	Mystic		1920	1926	Became Iowa 138
No. 71	3	4.8	Moulton	No. 3 near Moulton		1920	1926	Became Iowa 142
No. 75	2	3.2	No. 5 near Marcus	Marcus		1920	1926	Became Iowa 143
No. 90	40	64	No. 17 near Bouton	No. 16 at Harcourt		1920	1926	Became Iowa 16

== Route changes ==
This table represents sections of routes that were eliminated or reassigned to or from another route in the primary highway system.

Number	Change in length		Southern or western terminus	Northern or eastern terminus	Formed	Removed	Notes
Number	mi	km	Southern or western terminus	Northern or eastern terminus	Formed	Removed	Notes
Iowa 2	-202	−325	US 32 in Council Bluffs	US 63 in Oskaloosa	1920	1939	Became US 32 and US 63
Iowa 4	-91	−146	US 20 near Schaller	US 71 north of Spirit Lake	1920	1968	Became US 71
Iowa 5	-201	−323	Iowa 16 at Fort Dodge	US 55 / US 61 in Dubuque	1920	1968	Became US 20
Iowa 7	-181	−291	US 32 / US 65 in Des Moines	US 32 at Davenport	1920	1939	Became US 32
Iowa 10	-35 (Note: Route mileage is determined by comparing the 1926 and 1932 state highway maps.)	−56	Iowa 13 in Strawberry Point	US 18 / Iowa 13 in McGregor	1920	current	Duplication with Iowa 13 removed between Strawberry Point and McGregor
Iowa 11	-141	−227	Route 15 south of Milton	US 161 in Cedar Rapids	1920	1941	Duplication with US 161 removed; rest became Iowa 1 and Iowa 23
Iowa 12	-77	−124	US 30 / US 75 at Missouri Valley	US 75 in Sioux City	1920	current	Became US 75
Iowa 13	-148	−238	Route 63 south of Bloomfield	US 161 in Marion	1920	current	Became Iowa 150, Iowa 149, and US 63
Iowa 14	-22	−35	Route 65 at Lineville	Iowa 3 in Corydon	1920	current	Replaced by US 65 and Iowa 40
Iowa 15	-131	−211	Route 29 near Redding	US 30 / US 65 in Ames	1920	1935	Became Iowa 16 and Iowa 28
Iowa 17	-82	−132	Iowa 59 in Albia Iowa 9 in Estherville	US 32 / Iowa 16 in Adel US 71 / Iowa 9 in Spirit Lake	1920	1968	Became Iowa 6 and US 32; duplication with Iowa 9 removed
Iowa 19	-287	−462	US 75 near Doon	US 18 at McGregor	1920	1926	Rest of Iowa 19 became US 18 later in 1926
Iowa 24	-32	−51	US 63 in Oskaloosa	US 63 in Ottumwa	1920	1927	Duplication with US 63 removed
Iowa 35	-37	−60	US 71 near Lake View	Iowa 17 near Lake City	1920	1948	Duplication with US 71 removed; rest became Iowa 151
Iowa 47	3	4.8	Iowa 144 near Gowrie	Iowa 16 at Harcourt	1920	1940	Extended along No. 16
Iowa 58	-23	−37	Iowa 14 near Grundy Center	US 218 near Garrison	1920	current	Duplication with Iowa 14 and Iowa 59 removed; became Iowa 90 and Iowa 8
Iowa 74	-28	−45	US 161 in Iowa City	Iowa 38 in Tipton	1920	1941	Duplication with Iowa 38 removed; rest became Iowa 139
Iowa 117	35	56	US 161 at Anamosa	US 61 at Maquoketa	1920	1936	Extended along No. 61
Former
