= Virginia State Route 69 =

State highway in western Virginia, US

State Route 69
- Lead Mine Road

Route information
- Maintained by VDOT
- Length: 3.59 mi (5.78 km)
- Existed: 1958–present

Major junctions
- West end: SR 636 in Austinville
- I-77 at Poplar Camp
- East end: US 52 at Poplar Camp

Location
- Country: United States
- State: Virginia
- Counties: Wythe, Carroll

Highway system
- Virginia Routes; Interstate; US; Primary; Secondary; Byways; History; HOT lanes
| ← SR 68 | → SR 70 |

State Route 69 (SR 69) is a primary state highway in the U.S. state of Virginia. Known as Lead Mine Road, the state highway runs 3.59 miles (5.78 km) from SR 636 in Austinville east to U.S. Route 52 (US 52) in Poplar Camp. SR 69 is the last remnant of a much longer route. At its peak from 1940 to 1945, this route (then numbered State Route 81) ran from State Route 91 at Lodi east via St. Clair Bottom, Sugar Grove, Cedar Springs, Speedwell, Porters Crossroads, and Austinville to today's SR 69. However, it was never fully continuous; portions from Sugar Grove to Cedar Springs and west of Porters Crossroads to east of Austinville were secondary routes. The full length of this route as it existed and was planned is now part of SR 762, part of SR 660, all of SR 650, part of SR 16 (and SR 695, its former alignment at Sugar Grove), all of SR 614, part of SR 749, part of US 21, part of SR 690, a small piece of SR 642, part of SR 619, part of SR 636, and SR 69.

== Route description ==
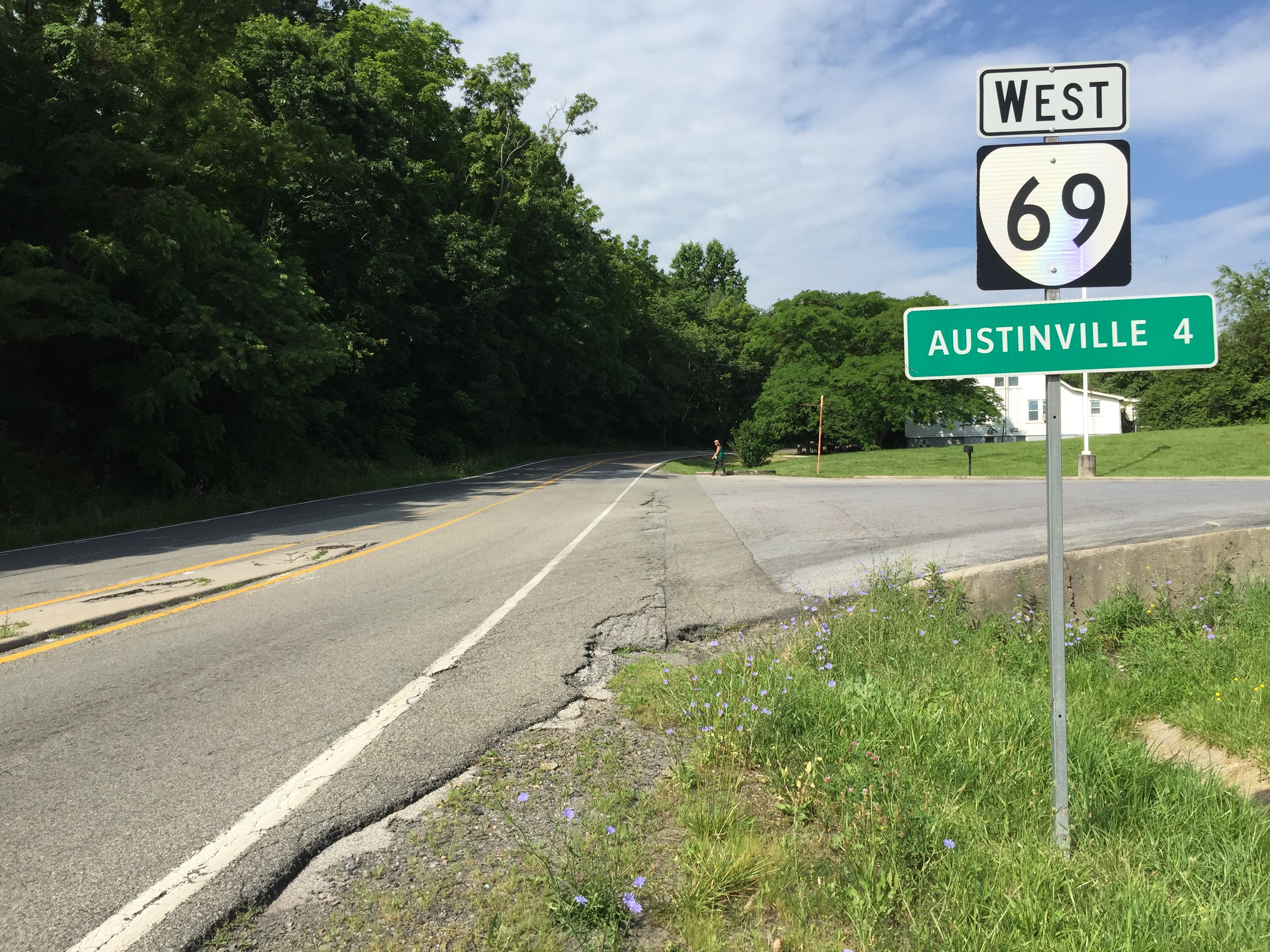
View west along SR 69 at I-77 in Poplar Camp

SR 69 begins at an intersection with SR 636 (Store Hill Road) just south of the village of Austinville on the New River. The state highway heads east parallel to Poplar Camp Mountain and the Wythe–Carroll county line, which the highway travels atop for a short distance through the hamlet of Bethany. SR 69 expands to a four-lane divided highway through its diamond interchange with Interstate 77 before reaching its eastern terminus at US 52 (Fort Chiswell Road) in Poplar Camp.

== History ==
From Lodi to north of Troutdale, what later became SR 81 was part of State Route 12 until 1933 and U.S. Route 58 until 1940. Other than the State Route 16 concurrency, which was added to the state highway system in 1931 as part of State Route 113, the first new pieces of the route were added in 1928. These sections ran from State Route 26 (now U.S. Route 21) at Speedwell west to Cedar Springs and from SR 26 north of Speedwell east towards Porters Crossroads for 6.94 miles (11.17 km) to a point west of present SR 642. A 3.50-mile (5.63 km) piece from State Route 15 (now U.S. Route 52 at Poplar Camp towards Austinville, was added in 1930 as State Route 116. This was the last piece of the Lodi-Poplar Camp route to be added to the primary state highway system.

Several other pieces of SR 115 from Cedar Springs north through Rural Retreat were added in 1930 and 1932, but became State Route 90 in the 1933 renumbering; the pieces of SR 115 east of Cedar Springs, plus a proposed extension west to Sugar Grove, became State Route 91. The State Route 91 designation was needed in the 1940 renumbering to match Tennessee's State Route 91 on the former State Route 81, so this State Route 81 designation was used for the former SR 91 from Sugar Grove to Poplar Camp. At the same time, U.S. Route 58 was relocated to the south, and SR 91 was extended southwest and west from Sugar Grove along State Route 16 and former US 58 to Lodi.

The first section of this route to be transferred to the secondary system was from State Route 79 at St. Clair Bottom to SR 16 southwest of Sugar Grove in 1945; the part from St. Clair Bottom west to Lodi became an extension of SR 79. The next year, the piece from US 21 north of Speedwell towards Porters Crossroads became a secondary route, as it was a "stub end primary route that could be transferred with logic" with an annual average daily traffic of 201 in 1941, and the route from Speedwell west to State Route 90 at Cedar Springs became an extension of SR 90. This left only the present SR 69, which was renumbered in 1958 to avoid conflicting with the new Interstate 81. (The two pieces that became SR 79 and SR 90 are now also secondary routes.)

== Major intersections ==
| County | Location | mi | km | Destinations | Notes |
|---|---|---|---|---|---|
| Wythe | Austinville | 0.00 | 0.00 | SR 636 (Store Hill Road / Loafers Rest Road) | Western terminus |
| Carroll | No major junctions | | | | |
| Wythe | | 3.29 | 5.29 | I-77 – Fort Chiswell, Hillsville | Exit 24 (I-77) |
| Wythe | Poplar Camp | 3.59 | 5.78 | US 52 (Fort Chiswell Road) – Fort Chiswell, Bluefield, Hillsville, Shot Tower Historical Park | Eastern terminus |
1.000 mi = 1.609 km; 1.000 km = 0.621 mi

| < SR 114 | District 1 State Routes; 1928–1933 | SR 117 > |
