= 1926 Missouri highway renumbering =

This article is part of the highway renumbering series.
Alabama	1928, 1957
Arkansas	1926
California	1964
Colorado	1953, 1968
Connecticut	1932, 1963
Florida	1945
Indiana	1926
Iowa	1926, 1969
Louisiana	1955
Maine	1933
Massachusetts	1933
Minnesota	1934
Missouri	1926
Montana	1932
Nebraska	1926
Nevada	1976
New Jersey	1927, 1953
New Mexico	1926, 1988
New York	1927, 1930
North Carolina	1934, 1937, 1940, 1961
North Dakota	1926
Ohio	1923, 1927, 1962
Pennsylvania	1928, 1961
Puerto Rico	1953
South Carolina	1928, 1937
South Dakota	1927, 1975
Tennessee	1983
Texas	1939, 1990
Utah	1962, 1977
Virginia	1923, 1928, 1933, 1940, 1958
Washington	1964
Wisconsin	1926
Wyoming	1927

In 1926 and 1927, Missouri implemented a major renumbering of its state highways because of the implementation of the US Highway System. Routes 2, 3, 7, 8, 9, 11, 12, 14, and 23 were entirely replaced by U.S. Routes. Routes 36, 40, 50, 60, 61, 62, 63, 65, 67, and 69 conflicted with new designations (note that Route 71, another conflicting number, had already been replaced by Route 3 by then because the portion of Route 3 here was not built), so the routes with these numbers had been renumbered. Note that a route number wasn't decided for renumbering State Route 65 (which was just removed from the state highway system temporarily) until 1927.

Old	New	From	To
Route 1	U.S. Route 71	Arkansas	St. Joseph
Route 1	Route 1	St. Joseph	Iowa
Route 1F	U.S. Route 60	Kansas	Joplin
Route 2	U.S. Route 40	Kansas City	St. Louis
Route 3	U.S. Route 65	Arkansas	Iowa
Route 4	Route 4	St. Joseph	Wayland
Route 4	U.S. Route 61	Wayland	Iowa
Route 7	U.S. Route 63	Arkansas	Iowa
Route 8	U.S. Route 36	St. Joseph	Hannibal
Route 9	U.S. Route 61	Arkansas	Wayland
Route 9	Route 4B	Kahoka (Route 9 overlapped Route 4 from Wayland)	Iowa
Route 11	U.S. Route 69	Excelsior Springs (US 69 overlapped Route 10 from Kansas City)	Iowa
Route 12	U.S. Route 50	Kansas City	East of Union (US 50 overlapped US 60 to St. Louis)
Route 13	Route 66	Buffalo	Bolivar
Route 13	Route 13	Bolivar	Gallatin
Route 14	U.S. Route 60	Carthage (US 60 overlapped US 71 from Joplin)	St. Louis
Route 16	Route 16	Oklahoma	Springfield
Route 16	U.S. Route 62	Springfield	Illinois
N/A?	U.S. Route 71	Maryville	Iowa
Route 23	U.S. Route 67	Arkansas	Fredericktown
Route 27	U.S. Route 71	Savannah (US 71 overlapped Route 1 from St. Joseph)	Maryville
Route 27	Route 27	Maryville	Iowa
Route 33	Route 1	Nashua	West of Plattsburg
Route 33	Route 33	West of Plattsburg	West of Cameron
Route 36	Route 12	Kansas	Springfield
Route 40	Route 14	Billings	Roosevelt
Route 50	Route 1	West of Plattsburg	St. Joseph
Route 60	Route 2	West of Leeton	Windsor
Route 61	Route 9	Tarkio	Iowa
Route 62	Route 8	Steelville	Potosi
Route 63	Route 7	Harrisonville	East of Lee's Summit
Route 65	N/A	St. James	Vichy
Route 66	Route 66	El Dorado Springs	Fair Play (overlapped Route 13 to Bolivar after 1926)
Route 67	Route 3	Rocheport	Fayette
Route 69	Route 13	Springfield	Bolivar (Route 13 overlapped Route 66 to Fair Play)

In 1927, additional renumberings took place, as what was planned as US 62 became US 60, what was planned as US 60 became US 66, and US 24 and US 54, which were not originally planned to enter the state, were added; State Routes 24 and 54 were renumbered, State Route 66 (another conflictive number) was replaced by US 54, and Route 68 was used for renumbering the road that was Route 65 before 1926.

Old	New	From	To
U.S. Route 60	U.S. Route 66	Kansas	Illinois
U.S. Route 62	U.S. Route 60	Springfield	Kentucky
Route 4	Route 4	St. Joseph	Wayland
Route 10	Route 10	Kansas City	Carrollton
Route 10	U.S. Route 24	Carrollton (US 24 overlapped US 65 from Waverly)	Monroe City
Route 15	U.S. Route 54	Buffalo	Mexico
Route 15	Route 15	Mexico	Iowa
Route 20	U.S. Route 24	Kansas	Waverly (Route 20 overlapped US 65 to Marshall)
Route 20	Route 20	Marshall	Huntsville
Route 22	Route 22	Clark	Mexico
Route 22	U.S. Route 54	Mexico	Illinois
Route 24	Route 52	Kansas	Tuscumbia
Route 26	U.S. Route 54	Kansas	Eldorado Springs
Route 26	Route 62	Eldorado Springs	Osceola
Route 32	Route 32	Licking	Flat River (32 overlaps US 61 to Farmington)
Route 52	Route 4	Kansas	St. Joseph
Route 54	Route 26	Paris	New London
Route 66	U.S. Route 54	Eldorado Springs	Buffalo
Route 68	Route 32	Farmington (32 overlaps US 61 to Flat River)	Sainte Genevieve
N/A (this was 65 before 1926)	Route 68	St. James	Vichy
N/A (new construction)	U.S. Route 24	West of Hannibal (US 24 overlapped US 36 from Monroe City)	Palmyra
N/A?	U.S. Route 24	Taylor (US 24 overlapped US 61 from Palmyra)	Illinois
