= 1983 Tennessee state highway renumbering =

State highway renumbering in Tennessee, United States

This article is part of the highway renumbering series.
Alabama	1928, 1957
Arkansas	1926
California	1964
Colorado	1953, 1968
Connecticut	1932, 1963
Florida	1945
Indiana	1926
Iowa	1926, 1969
Louisiana	1955
Maine	1933
Massachusetts	1933
Minnesota	1934
Missouri	1926
Montana	1932
Nebraska	1926
Nevada	1976
New Jersey	1927, 1953
New Mexico	1926, 1988
New York	1927, 1930
North Carolina	1934, 1937, 1940, 1961
North Dakota	1926
Ohio	1923, 1927, 1962
Pennsylvania	1928, 1961
Puerto Rico	1953
South Carolina	1928, 1937
South Dakota	1927, 1975
Tennessee	1983
Texas	1939, 1990
Utah	1962, 1977
Virginia	1923, 1928, 1933, 1940, 1958
Washington	1964
Wisconsin	1926
Wyoming	1927

The 1983 Tennessee state highway renumbering occurred when the Tennessee Department of Transportation (TDOT) took control of approximately 3,300 miles (5,300 km) of city and county maintained roads, designating them as state routes. As part of this process, most state routes with suffixed or special designations were renumbered with general numerical designations, and the state route system was divided into primary and secondary highways.

== Background ==
The Tennessee Department of Highways, predecessor to the Tennessee Department of Transportation (TDOT), was founded in 1915, and gradually assumed control of major routes throughout the state. The first 78 state routes were designated on October 1, 1923, and additional routes were added over the course of the succeeding decades. By the time of the 1983 takeover, the state route system consisted of approximately 175 numbered routes, in addition to many special suffixed routes. Suffixes and special designations used included "-A" for alternate, "-Byp" for bypass, "-Bus" for business routes, "-Conn" and "-Spur" for connector and spur routes, and "-Temp" for temporary routes. The Tennessee state route shield consisted of a white inverted triangle with the number in large black print and the letters "Tenn" below in smaller capital letters.

== State highway takeover and renumberings ==
As traffic increased on roadways throughout the state, many counties increasingly struggled to appropriate the funding to maintain their major roads, many of which connected to Interstate Highways. In addition, a 1983 study conducted by TDOT found that a number of important roads were partially maintained by both the state and local governments.

In May 1983, Tennessee Governor Lamar Alexander signed legislation which allowed for the state to assume control of 3,300 miles (5,300 km) of city and county maintained roads, and made an additional 11,500 miles (18,500 km) of rural roads eligible for state aid. TDOT took control of these roads on July 1, 1983, and incorporated them into the state route system. In addition, as part of this process, the state renumbered most of their suffixed and special routes with by replacing them with extensions or rerouting of existing routes or entirely new designations altogether. State routes were also divided into primary and secondary highways, with new primary shields unveiled to the public in November 1983; secondary routes retained the inverted triangle shields, with the "Tenn" removed. Primary designations were given to highway sections that are part of the Federal-aid primary highway system, and secondary routes, commonly called county routes, are part of the Federal-aid secondary highway system. The sign changes were implemented in 1984 at a cost of $1.3 million (equivalent to $3.31 million in 2024).

== Route renumbering list ==
Old route	New Route	Notes
SR 1 Byp.	SR 1	Located in Dickson. The old route of SR 1 became part of SR 235.
SR 1 Byp.	SR 1	Located in McMinnville. The old route of SR 1 became SR 380.
SR 1 Spur	SR 277 and part of SR 57	Eastern spur.
SR 1 Spur	SR 4	Western spur; the old route of SR 4 became SR 278.
SR 2A	SR 317	Replaced by part of SR 317.
SR 2 Bus.	SR 39	
SR 2 Byp.	SR 2	SR 2 was rerouted from US 11 onto the US 11 Bypass in Cleveland, replacing SR 2 Byp.; An extension of SR 74 replaced SR 2's original alignment.
SR 2 Loop	SR 2	
SR 2 Spur	SR 316	
SR 3 Byp.	SR 3	Located in Dyersburg; the old route of SR 2 became part of SR 211.
SR 3 Byp.	SR 3	Located in Union City; the old route of SR 3 became part of SR 184.
SR 3 Spur	SR 4	
SR 4 Spur	None	Decommissioned
SR 5A	SR 365	
SR 5 Bus.	SR 367	
SR 5 Byp.	SR 186	Component route to US 45 Byp. in Jackson; replaced by part of SR 186.
SR 5 Byp.	SR 366	
SR 8 Spur	SR 389	
SR 10A	SR 376	
SR 11 Byp.	SR 106	Replaced by an extension of SR 106.
SR 14A	SR 175	Replaced by part of SR 175.
SR 15 Byp.	SR 15	The old route of SR 15 became part of SR 273.
SR 18A	SR 368	
SR 20A	SR 240	
SR 22 Byp.	SR 22	Replaced by a rerouting of SR 22 in Huntingdon; the old route became SR 22 Business.
SR 24A	SR 26	Replaced by an extension of SR 26 in Lebanon.
SR 27 Spur	SR 29	Replaced by an extension of SR 29.
SR 28 (part)	SR 283	SR 28 was rerouted over part of SR 27 and existing county roads, and the old route of SR 28 and the separated part of SR 27 became SR 283.
SR 29A	SR 328	
SR 29A Spur	SR 299	
SR 29 Byp.	SR 29	Replaced by a rerouting of SR 29; the old route became SR 378.
SR 32 Byp.	SR 32	Replaced by a rerouting of SR 32; the old route became SR 343.
SR 34 Byp.	SR 34	Replaced by a rerouting of SR 34 in Johnson City; a section of the old route became an extension of SR 91, while the remainder of the old route was decommissioned.
SR 34 Byp.	SR 34	Replaced by a rerouting of SR 34 in Greeneville
SR 34 Spur	None	Appears to have been decommissioned.
SR 40 Byp.	SR 311, SR 60	Original companion designation for APD-40 (US 64 Byp.) in Cleveland; replaced by a new designation (which replaced the old route of SR 60) and a rerouting of SR 60.
SR 43 Byp.	SR 215	Road is shown as an unlabeled state highway on pre-1983 maps.
SR 43 Spur	SR 372	
SR 50A	SR 373	
SR 55 Bus.	SR 379	
SR 56A	SR 291	
SR 58A	SR 326	
SR 67A	SR 359	
SR 69 Byp.	SR 69	Replaced by a rerouting of SR 69; the section of the old route that was not already part of SR 76 became SR 356.
SR 73 Scenic	SR 337	SR 73 Scenic is still posted.
SR 76 Byp.	SR 76	Replaced by an extension of SR 76; the old route became SR 369.
SR 77 Spur?	SR 364	
SR 81A	SR 353	
SR 83	SR 4	Replaced by a rerouting of SR 4; SR 83 was reassigned as an upgrade of existing county roads.
SR 85A	SR 262	
SR 87A	SR 371	
SR 93A	SR 355	
SR 93 Bus.	SR 126	Replaced by an extension of SR 126.
SR 101 (part)	SR 285, SR 301	SR 101 rerouted over existing county roads; old route replaced by part of new SR 285 and new SR 301.
SR 112A	SR 76	Replaced by a rerouting of SR 76
SR 140 (part)	SR 218	SR 140 rerouted over existing county roads; old route replaced by SR 218.
SR 148A	SR 148	Replaced by an extension of SR 148; the old route became SR 318.
SR 156A	SR 377	
SR 42 Bus.?	SR 294	Unclear if old the old route of SR 42 in Livingston was redesignated or turned back when SR 42 was rerouted over the bypass; this road became part of SR 294.
new?	SR 319	Upgraded county roads except for possibly the Robinson Bridge section.
new?	SR 374	May be upgraded county roads, but may have had a pre-1983 designation.
