= Pattonsville, Virginia =

Unincorporated community in Virginia, US

Coordinates: 36°41′58″N 82°51′05″W

Pattonsville is an unincorporated community in Scott County, in the U.S. state of Virginia.

== History ==
A post office called Pattonsville was established in 1843, and remained in operation until it was discontinued in 1907. The community was named for Samuel Patton, a local minister.
