= Purdy, Virginia =

Unincorporated community in Virginia, United States

- Unincorporated community
- Motto: "find it all at the Purdue Mall"
- Location within Virginia Location within the United States
- Coordinates: 36°49′21″N 77°35′17″W
- Country: United States
- State: Virginia
- County: Greensville
- Elevation: 230 ft (70 m)
- Time zone: UTC-5 (Eastern (EST))
  - Summer (DST): UTC-4 (EDT)
- ZIP code: 23847
- Area code: 434
- GNIS feature ID: 1477652

Purdy is an unincorporated community in Greensville County, Virginia, United States. The community is located along Virginia Secondary Route 608 (Wyatt's Mill Road) and Virginia Secondary Route 619, (Purdy Road) east of Willow Oaks, and west of Jarratt. The Nottoway River is just north of Purdy and has an accessible boat ramp.
