= Enterprise, Hocking County, Ohio =

Unincorporated community in Ohio, U.S.

Coordinates: 39°33′53″N 82°28′47″W

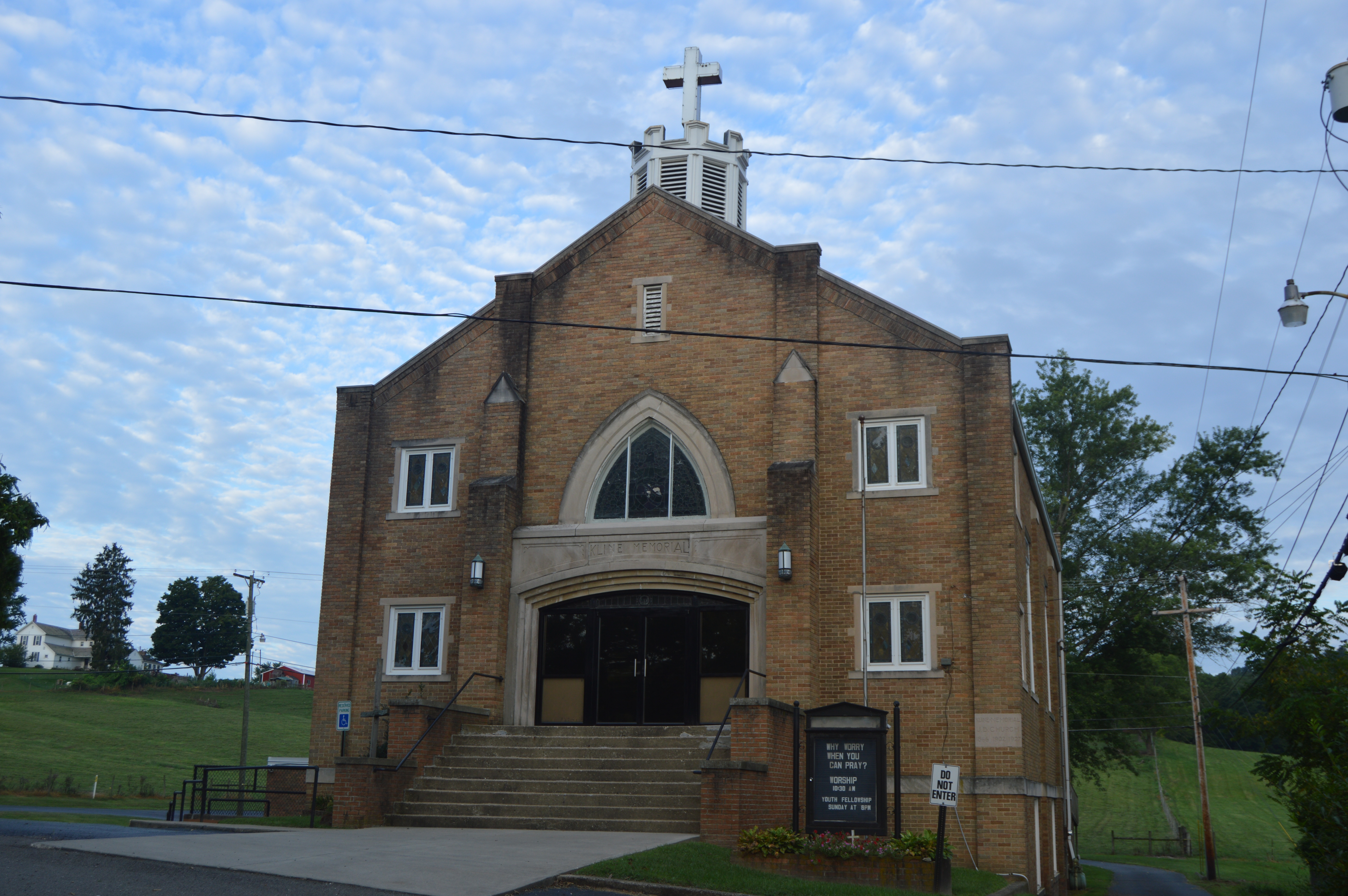
Kline Memorial Methodist Church

Enterprise is an unincorporated community in Hocking County, in the U.S. state of Ohio.

== History ==
Enterprise contained a post office between 1870 and 1966. In 1883, Enterprise was one of two post offices within Falls Township.
