= Frog Level, Tazewell County, Virginia =

Frog Level, Virginia
- Unincorporated community
- Location within Virginia Location within the United States
- Coordinates: 37°05′59″N 81°33′48″W
- Country: United States
- State: Virginia
- County: Tazewell
- Elevation: 2,385 ft (727 m)
- Time zone: UTC-5 (Eastern (EST))
  - Summer (DST): UTC-4 (EDT)
- Area code: 276
- GNIS feature ID: 1484347

Frog Level is an unincorporated community located in Tazewell County, Virginia, United States.
