= Lodi, Virginia =

Lodi
- Unincorporated community
- Location within Virginia Location within the United States
- Coordinates: 36°42′53″N 81°46′38″W
- Country: United States
- State: Virginia
- County: Washington
- Elevation: 2,073 ft (632 m)
- Time zone: UTC-5 (Eastern (EST))
  - Summer (DST): UTC-4 (EDT)
- Area code: 276
- GNIS feature ID: 1485029

Lodi is an unincorporated community in Washington County, Virginia, United States. Lodi is located on Virginia State Route 91, 5 miles (8.0 km) south of Glade Spring. It derives its name from the Italian city of Lodi.

== Liberty Hall School ==
The Liberty Hall School was once a prominent building for southern youth and students to educate themselves in Lodi, Va. The Washington County School Board later turned it into a county school for grades K-12.
