= Virginia State Route 91 =

State highway in western Virginia, US

State Route 91

Route information
- Maintained by VDOT
- Length: 55.15 mi (88.76 km)
- Existed: 1940–present
- Tourist routes: Virginia Byway

Major junctions
- South end: SR 91 near Damascus
- US 58 in Damascus; US 11 in Glade Spring; I-81 in Glade Spring
- North end: US 19 Bus. / US 460 Bus. at Frog Level

Location
- Country: United States
- State: Virginia
- Counties: Washington, Smyth, Tazewell

Highway system
- Virginia Routes; Interstate; US; Primary; Secondary; Byways; History; HOT lanes
← SR 90	→ SR 92

State Route 91 (SR 91) is a primary state highway in the U.S. state of Virginia. The state highway runs 55.12 miles (88.71 km) from the Tennessee state line near Damascus, where the highway continues as Tennessee State Route 91 (SR 91), north to U.S. Route 19 Business (US 19 Business) and US 460 Business at Frog Level. SR 91 connects Damascus in southeastern Washington County with the northeastern county town Glade Spring, where the highway has junctions with US 11 and Interstate 81 (I-81). The state highway also indirectly connects Saltville in northwestern Smyth County and Tazewell, the county seat of Tazewell County. SR 91 was the last primary state highway in Virginia with an unpaved section; this gravel section was in southern Tazewell County before being paved in January 2026.

== Route description ==
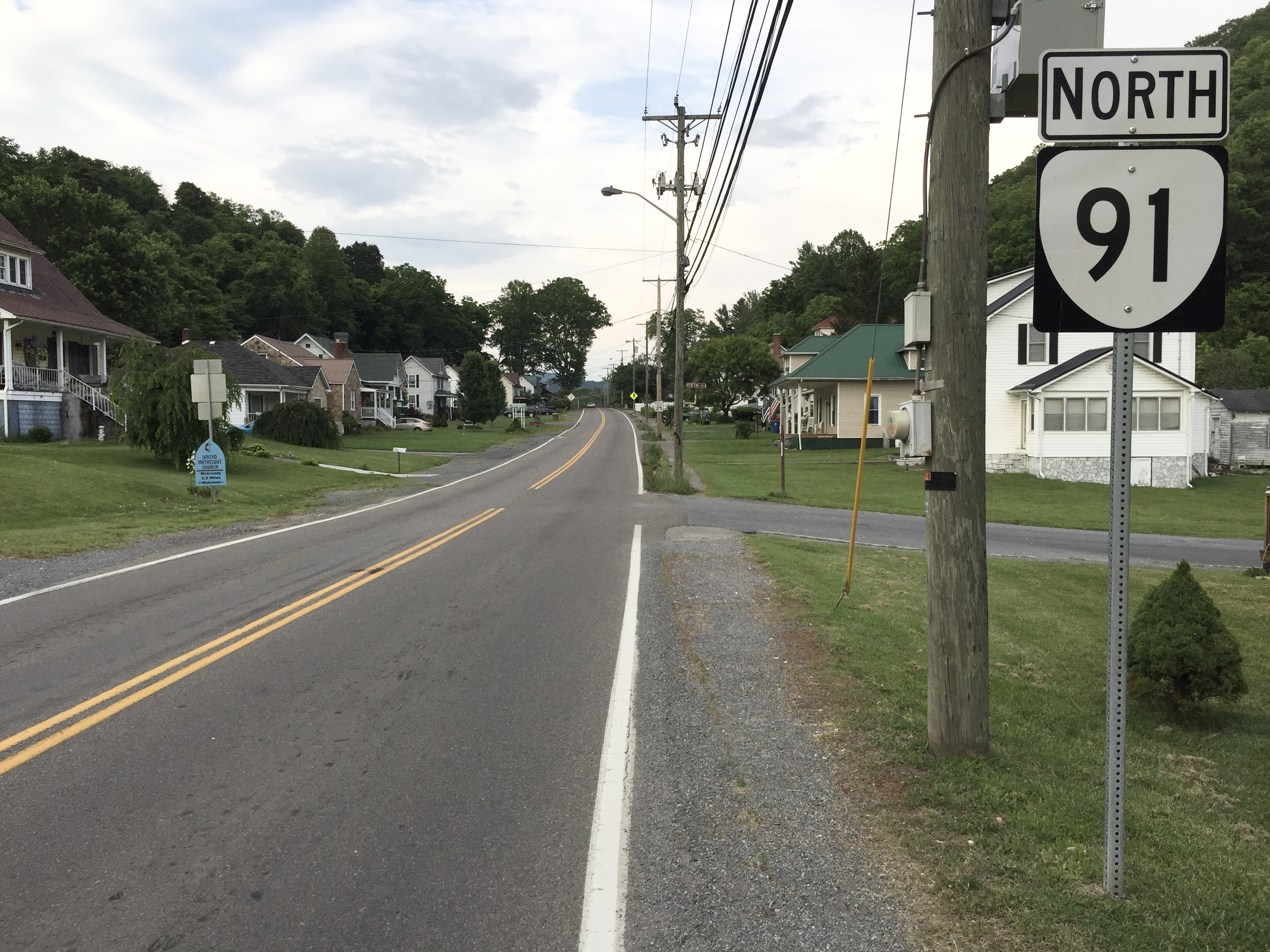
View north along SR 91 in Saltville

SR 91 begins at the Tennessee state line southeast of Damascus. The highway continues south into Tennessee as SR 91 toward Mountain City. SR 91 heads northwest as Mountain City Road, which parallels Laurel Creek through the Iron Mountains to the creek's confluence with Whitetop Laurel Creek. Just west of that confluence, the state highway crosses Laurel Creek, intersects the Virginia Creeper Trail rail trail, and runs concurrently with US 58 (Jeb Stuart Highway) parallel to the creek and trail into the town of Damascus. When US 58 turns west to cross Laurel Creek into the center of town, SR 91 continues north and then west on Damascus Drive. The state highway veers north away from Laurel Creek and leaves the town as Monroe Road, which passes through the village of Lodi between crossings of the South Fork and Middle Fork of the Holston River.

Just south of Glade Spring, SR 91 intersects US 11 (Lee Highway) and continues north as Maple Street through a diamond interchange with I-81 and into the town. When Maple Street continues straight as SR 91 Business, SR 91 veers east as Monte Vista Drive to bypass the downtown area. The state highway receives the northern end of the business route, Glade Street, east of downtown. SR 91 crosses over Norfolk Southern Railway's Pulaski District and exits the town on Crescent Road, which passes through McCall Gap in Walker Mountain. Shortly after entering the town of Saltville, where the highway is named Main Street, the highway veers east and crosses the Washington–Smyth county line. At the east end of the downtown area, SR 91 meets the northern end of SR 107 (Worthy Boulevard). The state highway crosses the North Fork Holston River and parallels it east as Saltville Highway to the hamlet of Broadford, where the highway meets the southern end of SR 42 (Blue Grass Trail) and turns north to follow Laurel Creek through Brushy Mountain.

SR 91 continues northeast as Veterans Road into Tazewell County. The state highway briefly follows Laurel Creek through the Freestone Valley before ascending Flattop Mountain near Tannersville. At the end of its descent from the mountain, SR 91 meets the western end of SR 607 (Little Tumbling Creek Road) and crosses the eponymous creek. Just north of the bridge, the state highway's surface changes from asphalt to gravel. The gravel road continues for about 5.5 miles (8.9 km) on the state highway's crossing of Clinch Mountain. SR 91 returns to asphalt road just south of its intersection with SR 604 (Thompson Valley Road), from which the highway follows Maiden Spring Road. At the hamlet of Maiden Spring, the state highway crosses the Little River, a tributary of the Clinch River, and veers east to the hamlet of Liberty. SR 91 continues east as Witten Valley Road through the namesake valley to its northern terminus at US 19 Business and US 460 Business (Crab Orchard Road) at Frog Level.

== Major intersections ==
County	Location	mi	km	Destinations	Notes
Washington		0.00	0.00	SR 91 south – Mountain City	Tennessee state line; southern terminus
Washington		1.62	2.61	US 58 east (J.E.B. Stuart Highway) – Independence	South end of concurrency with US 58
Washington	Damascus	2.61	4.20	US 58 west (East Third Street) – Abingdon, Bristol	North end of concurrency with US 58
Washington	Lodi			SR 803 (Liberty Hall Drive) – Cedarville	former SR 80 west
Washington				SR 762 (Loves Mill Road)	former SR 79 east
Washington	Old Glade Spring	14.70	23.66	US 11 (Lee Highway) – Abingdon, Chilhowie	
Washington		14.87	23.93	I-81 – Bristol, Marion	Exit 29 (I-81)
Washington	Glade Spring	15.38	24.75	SR 91 Bus. north (Maple Street) – Glade Spring, Emory	
Washington	Glade Spring	16.55	26.63	SR 91 Bus. south (Glade Street) – Glade Spring, Emory	
Smyth	Saltville	24.68	39.72	SR 107 south (Worthy Boulevard) to I-81 – Chilhowie	
Smyth	Broadford	31.47	50.65	SR 42 east (Bluegrass Trail) – Bland	
Tazewell				SR 601 (Freestone Valley Road)	
Tazewell		37.38	60.16	SR 607 (Little Tumbling Creek Road)	South end of gravel section
Tazewell		43.02	69.23	SR 604 (Thompson Valley Road)	North end of gravel section
Tazewell	Frog Level	55.12	88.71	US 19 Bus. / US 460 Bus. (Crab Orchard Road) – Pisgah, Tazewell	Northern terminus
1.000 mi = 1.609 km; 1.000 km = 0.621 mi: Concurrency terminus

== Glade Spring business route ==
State Route 91 Business
- Location: Glade Spring
- Length: 1.38 mi (2.22 km)

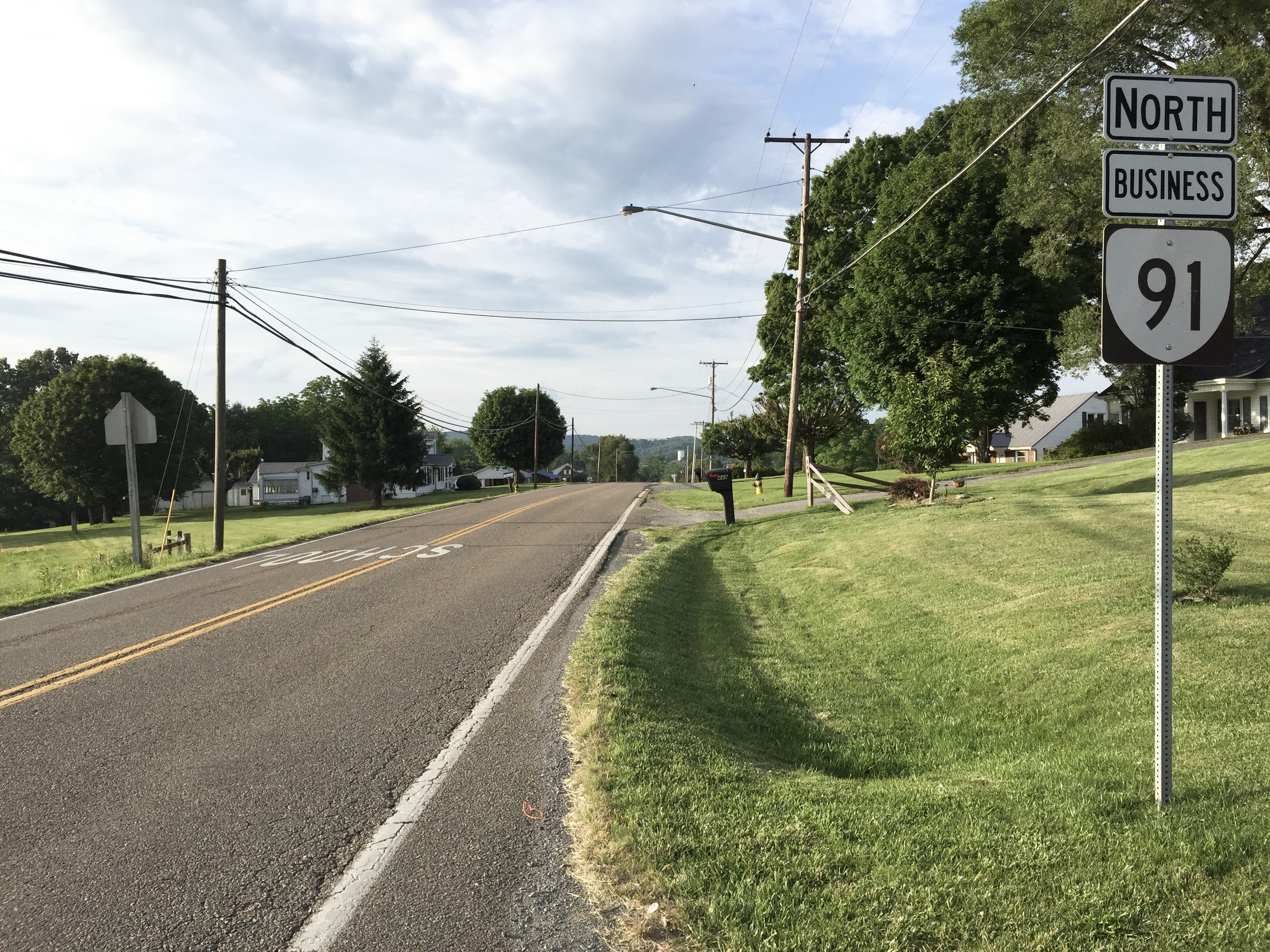
SR 91 Bus. at SR 91 in Glade Spring

State Route 91 Business (SR 91 Business) is a business route of SR 91 within the town of Glade Spring. The highway runs 1.38 miles (2.22 km) between intersections with SR 91 on the south and east sides of the town. SR 91 Business heads north on Maple Street where SR 91 curves east to bypass the center of town on Monte Vista Drive. One block south of the railroad tracks, the business route turns east onto Glade Street, which the highway follows through Glade Spring's downtown area. At the east edge of downtown, SR 91 Business veers southeast to reach its northern terminus at SR 91.

< SR 104	Spurs of SR 10; 1923–1928	SR 106 >
< SR 111	District 1 State Routes; 1928–1933	SR 113 >
< SR 129	District 1 State Routes; 1928–1933	SR 131 >
