= National Register of Historic Places listings in Wythe County, Virginia =

Location of Wythe County in Virginia

This is a list of the National Register of Historic Places listings in Wythe County, Virginia.

This is intended to be a complete list of the properties and districts on the National Register of Historic Places in Wythe County, Virginia, United States. The locations of National Register properties and districts for which the latitude and longitude coordinates are included below, may be seen in an online map.

There are 22 properties and districts listed on the National Register in the county.

This National Park Service list is complete through NPS recent listings posted March 13, 2026.

== Current listings ==
	Name on the Register	Image	Date listed	Location	City or town	Description
1	Cornett Archeological Site (44WY1)	Cornett Archeological Site (44WY1)	September 29, 1983 (#83003320)	New River below Austinville; 36°51′32″N 80°54′44″W	Austinville	
2	Crockett's Cove Presbyterian Church	Crockett's Cove Presbyterian Church	October 15, 1992 (#92001373)	Crockett's Cove Rd., east of its junction with Smith Hollow Rd. 37°01′35″N 81°02′14″W	Wytheville	
3	Fort Chiswell Mansion	Fort Chiswell Mansion	May 6, 1971 (#71000992)	325 Factory Outlet Drive; Interstate 81 near its junction with U.S. Route 52 and State Route 121; 36°56′46″N 80°56′12″W	Fort Chiswell	
4	Fort Chiswell Site	Fort Chiswell Site	August 29, 1978 (#78003046)	E Lee Highway; 36°56′54″N 80°56′04″W	Fort Chiswell	
5	Foster Falls Historic District	Foster Falls Historic District	November 12, 2009 (#09000925)	New River Trail State Park, 176 Orphanage Dr. 36°53′03″N 80°51′19″W	Max Meadows	
6	Andrew and Sarah Fulton Farm		May 26, 2022 (#100007782)	531 Kohler Ave. 36°51′42″N 80°54′17″W	Austinville vicinity	
7	Graham's Forge Mill	Graham's Forge Mill	May 26, 2005 (#05000481)	Major Graham Rd. 36°56′27″N 80°53′12″W	Max Meadows	
8	Maj. David Graham House	Maj. David Graham House	February 14, 1985 (#85000300)	Junction of Major Grahams and Carters Ferry Rds. 36°54′58″N 80°52′18″W	Fosters Falls	
9	Haller-Gibboney Rock House	Haller-Gibboney Rock House	November 9, 1972 (#72001419)	Monroe and Tazewell Sts. 36°57′02″N 81°05′04″W	Wytheville	
10	Kimberling Lutheran Cemetery	Kimberling Lutheran Cemetery	March 26, 1980 (#80004231)	Northwest of Rural Retreat; 36°55′05″N 81°18′17″W	Rural Retreat	
11	Loretto	Loretto	September 8, 1994 (#94001093)	190 Peppers Ferry Rd. 36°57′27″N 81°04′49″W	Wytheville	
12	Martin Site	Martin Site	August 13, 1974 (#74002152)	Bounded by Reed Creek Rd., the New River, and Reed Creek; 36°55′24″N 80°49′33″W	Fosters Falls	
13	McGavock Family Cemetery	McGavock Family Cemetery	June 22, 1979 (#79003098)	East of Fort Chiswell off Interstate 81; 36°56′52″N 80°55′29″W	Fort Chiswell	
14	Reed Creek Mill	Reed Creek Mill	November 22, 2016 (#16000802)	1565 S. Church St. 36°56′09″N 81°04′28″W	Wytheville	
15	Rural Retreat Depot	Rural Retreat Depot	August 25, 2014 (#14000531)	105 Railroad Ave. 36°53′38″N 81°16′35″W	Rural Retreat	
16	Sanders Farm	Sanders Farm	May 22, 2003 (#03000454)	3908 Fort Chiswell Rd. 36°52′26″N 80°52′16″W	Max Meadows	
17	Shot Tower	Shot Tower	October 1, 1969 (#69000286)	West of the junction of U.S. Route 52 with Foster Falls Rd. 36°52′13″N 80°52′13″W	Max Meadows	
18	St. John's Episcopal Church	St. John's Episcopal Church	September 9, 2008 (#08000894)	275 E. Main St. 36°57′03″N 81°04′55″W	Wytheville	
19	St. John's Lutheran Church and Cemetery	St. John's Lutheran Church and Cemetery	January 26, 1978 (#78003047)	Northwest of Wytheville at the junction of U.S. Routes 21/52 with Interstate 81; 36°57′42″N 81°06′03″W	Wytheville	
20	Wythe County Poorhouse Farm	Wythe County Poorhouse Farm	May 26, 2000 (#00000557)	Peppers Ferry Rd. 36°58′56″N 81°01′42″W	Wytheville	
21	Wytheville Historic District	Wytheville Historic District	September 30, 1994 (#94001179)	Roughly bounded by Monroe, 11th, Jefferson, and 12th Sts., and W. Railroad Ave. 36°56′50″N 81°05′04″W	Wytheville	
22	Zion Evangelical Lutheran Church Cemetery	Zion Evangelical Lutheran Church Cemetery	February 1, 1979 (#79003099)	Northwest of Speedwell; 36°50′28″N 81°13′21″W	Speedwell	

== See also ==
- List of National Historic Landmarks in Virginia
- National Register of Historic Places listings in Virginia
