= Martin Site (Fosters Falls, Virginia) =

Archaeological site in Virginia, United States

- U.S. National Register of Historic Places
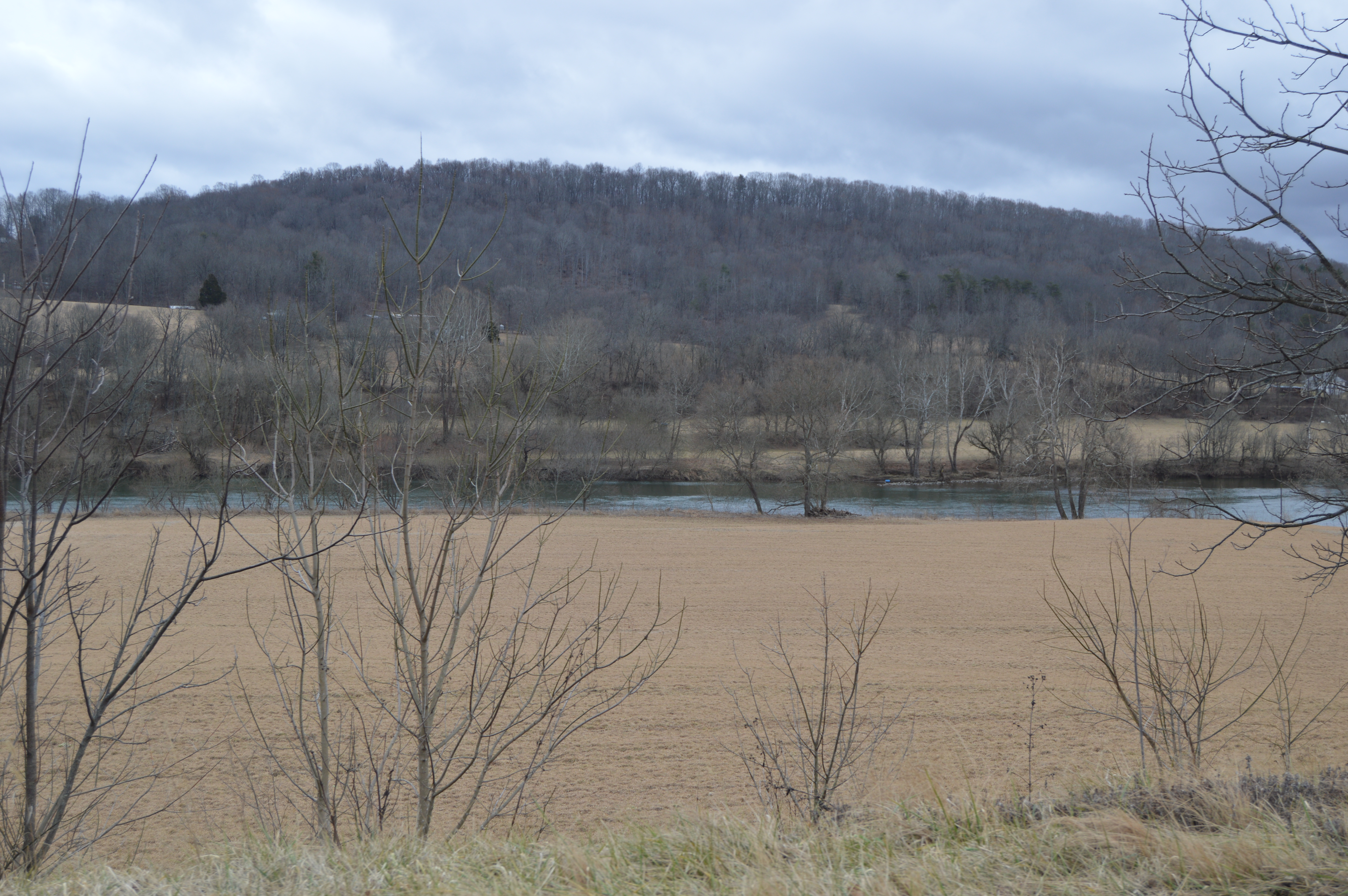
- Overview from Reed Creek Road
- Nearest city: Fosters Falls, Virginia
- Area: 4 acres (1.6 ha)
- NRHP reference No.: 74002152
- Added to NRHP: August 13, 1974

The Martin Site (44WY13) is a prehistoric Native American village site in Wythe County, Virginia, United States. It is located on the banks of the New River near the community of Fosters Falls. The site has clear evidence of occupation during the Late Woodland period, and offers evidence of older occupation. Finds at the site include pottery sherds, stone tools, ceramic and shell trade items, and grave sites.

Located on the New River floodplain, the site is protected by extensive alluvial deposits; it was cultivated for many years, but the river deposits are deep enough that the village site was never reached by the plow. Only an accident revealed the site: the resident, William Martin, was developing a campground on the site in May 1970 and encountered human bones while placing a septic tank. Local law enforcement quickly deemed the bones a prehistoric site, and an archaeologist from Richmond arrived within a few days to begin examining the location. Excavation began in July.

Large numbers of Late Archaic and Early Woodland projectile points were found at the site, leading the excavators to deem it a long-used village, but it was most densely occupied by the Dan River culture during the Late Woodland period, at which time it comprised a collection of circular houses possibly surrounded by a palisade. Most of the artifacts at the site, including more than sixteen thousand sherds, are attributed to the Dan River occupation, although radiocarbon dating provided a date of 1440 BC for one of the earlier cultures present at the site. As well as the human bones discovered by the owner, non-human bones are also plentiful, with deer being the most common, and typical New River mollusks, including clams, mussels, and Polygyra periwinkles. Because no European-produced trade goods are present at the site, occupation is believed to have ended before 1600. It may be contemporary with the Cornett Site about 6 miles (9.7 km) to the west near Austinville.

The site was listed on the National Register of Historic Places in 1974.

== See also ==
- National Register of Historic Places listings in Wythe County, Virginia
