= John Chiswell =

American politician

Member of the House of Burgesses for Williamsburg, Colony of Virginia
- In office 1756–1758
- Preceded by: George Wythe
- Succeeded by: Peyton Randolph

Member of the House of Burgesses for Hanover County, Colony of Virginia
- In office 1742–1755 Serving with Robert Harris, William Meriwether, Henry Robinson
- Preceded by: William Meriwether
- Succeeded by: John Syne

Personal details
- Born: circa 1710
- Died: October 14, 1766 Williamsburg, Colony of Virginia
- Spouse: Elizabeth Randolph
- Children: 4 daughters
- Education: in England
- Occupation: land speculator, planter, iron, copper and lead manufacturer, politician

Colonel John Chiswell (occasionally spelled in the era, Chizzell, per its pronunciation) (ca. 1710 – October 14, 1766), was a planter, land speculator, early industrialist and member of the Colonial House of Burgesses who in his final years caused a scandal which led to his well-publicized death, possibly a suicide on the eve of his trial for killing a merchant in western Virginia.

== Early life and marriage ==
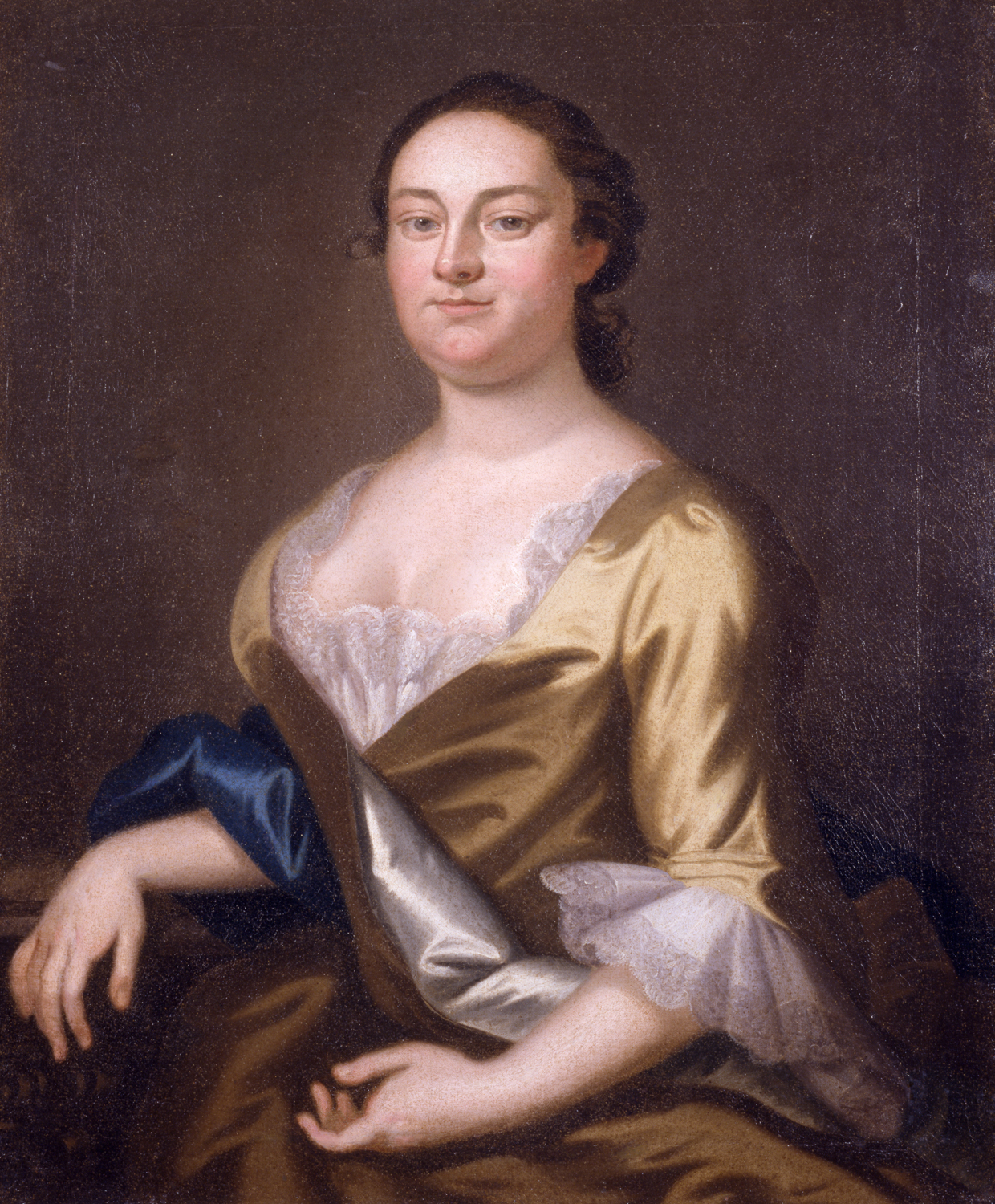
Elizabeth Randolph

The son of Esther Chiswell and her husband Charles Chiswell (born about 1678) was raised at Scotchtown, his father's plantation in Hanover County. Hanover County and the mansion house both date to 1719. In addition to cultivating tobacco on that plantation, Charles Chiswell was also a land speculator and at times Clerk of the General Court of Virginia.

John Chiswell married Elizabeth Randolph (daughter of William Randolph and sister of Peter Randolph, both members of the Governor's Council), on May 19, 1736. They had four children, all daughters: Elizabeth Chiswell (b. 24 May 1737); Susanna Randolph Chiswell (b. 1740); Mary Chiswell (b. about 1748) and Lucy Chiswell (born 3 Aug 1752). His wife survived him by a decade.

== Career ==
When his father died in 1737, Chiswell inherited the Scotchtown plantation, and the following year he became the colonel of the Hanover County militia. He continued to operate Scotchtown using overseers and enslaved labor until selling it to his political ally, business partner and son-in-law, Speaker John Robinson. He also expanded his father's land speculations westward, accumulating tens of thousands of acres. He was elected to the House of Burgesses from Hanover County in 1742 with Robert Harris, serving until 1747, He was elected again in 1748, serving until 1749.

In 1751, Chiswell moved his main residence from his Scotchtown plantation to the colonial capital at Williamsburg. In 1752, Chiswell and George Gilmer, a local physician, purchased the Raleigh Tavern in Williamsburg. Chiswell also operated an ordinary (tavern and inn) in James City County. Also in 1752, he was again elected Burgess from Hanover County, but was declared "not duly elected".

In 1756, Chiswell was elected Burgess from Williamsburg, serving until 1758.

By 1752, Chiswell was operating an iron furnace near Fredericksburg, Virginia, miles north of Scotchtown. At some point late in that decade, John Chiswell discovered lead outcroppings in then-vast Augusta County (near present day Wytheville in Wythe County). in 1761, he formed a partnership with Robinson, William Byrd, and Francis Fauquier (then the colony's resident lieutenant governor): the Lead Mine Company, which was later involved in the John Robinson estate scandal. In 1762, Chiswell traveled to England to have the ore analyzed and hire experienced Welsh miners to work alongside enslaved laborers.

The mine was so significant that it became a named landmark in the 1768 Treaty of Hard Labour with the Cherokees.

After Virginia declared its independence, the mine was operated by the state, and became an important lead supply for the Patriot cause.

Chiswell also was part owner of copper mines in Albemarle and Augusta Counties.

== Political life ==
Voters from Hanover County first elected John Chiswell as a burgess (a part-time position) in 1742, although his co-burgess Robert Harris soon accepted a full-time (and lucrative, but conflicting) post as the county surveyor and was replaced by William Meriwether, and re-elected the pair in 1748 to 1755. However, although they appeared to re-elect Chiswell, as well as John Syme, the election was invalidated, and while Chiswell was now re-elected alongside Henry Robinson, he soon moved to Williamsburg. Voters from Williamsburg then elected Chiswell as their representative, and the previous representative, Peyton Randolph, came to represent the College of William & Mary. Perhaps nearly as much as Randolph, Chiswell was closely aligned by marriage and family with many of the landed gentry and upper classes of Virginia, and represented the town from 1756 til 1758.

== Fort Chiswell ==
A fort was established in 1758 by William Byrd and named for Colonel John Chiswell. It was used during the French and Indian War, but was later abandoned. The Fort Chiswell Site is on the National Register of Historic Places.

== Murder Scandal ==
On June 3, 1766, "pretty early in the morning," Colonel Chiswell got into an argument with "...a Scotch gentleman" named Robert Routledge, a merchant from Prince Edward County, at Mosby Tavern, Cumberland County, Virginia, now Powhatan County, Virginia. According to several eyewitnesses, Colonel Chiswell, who was a Loyalist, called Routledge "a fugitive rebel, a villain who came to Virginia to cheat and defraud men of their property, and a Presbyterian fellow…" Both men were intoxicated, and when Chiswell was frustrated in attacking Routledge with a "bowl of Bumbo" or candlestick, called for his sword and demanded that Routledge leave the room. When Routledge refused, Chiswell killed him by stabbing him in the heart with his sword. For causing the death of Routledge, a justice of the peace remanded Colonel Chiswell to the county gaol. He was later conveyed to the public gaol in Williamsburg. However, three justices of the General Court at Willamsburg, William Byrd, III of Westover, John Blair Sr., and Presley Thornton, met the sheriff on the outskirts of the town and held a brief examining court. The result was Chiswell was allowed to post a small bail of £2,000. In the 18th century, bail, in any amount, for the crime of murder was virtually unheard of. Nonetheless, Chiswell was released and allowed to return to his home. There was immediate public outcry of favoritism and special treatment. At least one of the justices, William Byrd, was in fact Chiswell's friend and also a business partner in the lead mining operation.

As the scandal of Chiswell's murder of Robert Routledge unfolded, Virginians were still reeling from another scandal involving John Chiswell's late son-in-law John Robinson, Speaker of the House of Burgesses and Treasurer of Virginia. When Robinson died in May 1766, it was discovered that he had misappropriated public funds and that his estate owed the Commonwealth of Virginia over £1,000,000.

== Suicide ==
John Chiswell is thought to have committed suicide on October 14, 1766. His body was discovered on the floor of his home in Williamsburg, Virginia on October 15. The coroner stated it was an attack from nerves.

Because it is uncertain if he committed suicide, he was denied burial in the consecrated ground of Bruton Parish Church. His body was taken to his home at Scotchtown (plantation). When the wagon containing his coffin arrived, members of the murdered Robert Routledge family were there, and demanded that the coffin be opened so they could be sure he was dead, and the death was not a hoax. His grave is unmarked.

== Legacy ==
- Fort Chiswell, Virginia is named in his honor.
- His home, the Chiswell-Bucktrout House on Francis Street in Williamsburg, Virginia, still stands.
- The tenth season of the podcast Tenfold More Wicked focuses on the murder of Robert Routledge, the subsequent scandal, and how the fallout from the scandal impacted the future of Colonial America.

== Bibliography ==
- Kegley, Mary B. 2010. "Fort Chiswell and Chiswell's Lead Mines of Wythe County, Virginia: A New Perspective". Smithfield Review: Studies in the History of the Region West of the Blue Ridge. 14: 52-68.
- Lemay, J. A. Leo. Robert Bolling and the Bailment of Colonel Chriswell. [Place of publication not identified]: [publisher not identified], 1971. (In Early American literature—Vol. 6, no. 2 (Fall 1971)).
- Shephard, William Hendy. Colonel John Chiswell, Chiswell's Lead Mines, Fort Chiswell. 1936.
- Trotti, Michael Ayers. 2008. "The Origins of Virginia Crime Sensationalism". Abstract: This chapter describes how, over the next three months, the Virginia Gazette published fifteen articles on the Chiswell case, some anonymous, others pseudonymous, still others penned above the names of some of the most prominent Virginians of the era, including the colony's most influential lawyer, George Wythe, and a leading member of the House of Burgesses, John Blair. In all, the Virginia Gazette printed slightly more than six pages on this case over the course of four-and-a-half months, or about one-quarter of a page in each issue. In volume, the coverage was significant, particularly for this era; in tone, it was moderate, even tentative. In October, this flurry of activity ended when John Chiswell died of "nervous fits, owing to a constant uneasiness of mind" shortly before he was to go to trial.
- Virginia Gazette October 17, 1766.
