= John Robinson estate scandal =

The John Robinson estate scandal was a major financial scandal in Colonial Virginia.

After the 1766 death of John Robinson, the powerful and aristocratic Virginia planter who served as both Speaker of the House of Burgesses and the colony's treasurer, Robinson's protégé Edmund Pendleton discovered that Robinson's estate had significant debts. Robinson had been Speaker since 1738. Because of rumors concerning his handling of Treasury accounts, and because Robinson was widely considered one of the colony's richest men, the supervising judges appointed three executors and required an unprecedented bond of £250,000 (half as much as the colony had spent during the French and Indian War) from eight sureties (later shown to have been themselves indebted to the estate). Pendleton placed many notices in the Virginia Gazette and other venues, asking that all people in debt to Robinson "make immediate payment." However, the estate was not closed until 1808, and Pendleton's decision to pay debts owed the Commonwealth in depreciated currency produced a famous legal decision concerning federal/state relations.

== Scandal ==
The scandal smoldered long before Robinson's death. On January 10, 1764, Glasgow merchants trading in Virginia complained about unburned notes in the colony's treasury to the Lords of Trade. Not only was hard currency in short supply (causing prices to decrease over time), often aristocratic planters lived beyond their means. Many owed significant amounts to merchants on both sides of the Atlantic. Merchants and factors on the colonial side often extended liberal credit to secure rights to ship the planters' tobacco to their correspondents in London or Glasgow (which often offered better rates). On September 17, 1763, the colony's administrator, lieutenant governor Francis Fauquier, had explained to the same Lords of Trade that the offices had been combined because the Treasurer received a 2.5% commission on money raised and granted by the colony's Assembly, but "the advantages and profits from the Speakership being very inconsiderable, and inadequate for the great Trouble and Attendance of that Office."

In December, 1762, Pendleton had submitted a clean report on the Treasury's condition to the House of Burgesses. In May, 1763, Richard Bland, Richard Henry Lee and Benjamin Harrison had prepared a detailed report which again found nothing wrong, although Pendleton as executor later found the Treasury books had not been balanced for years. The report of yet another committee, established in December 1764, that Pendleton chaired and which included the previous committee members as well as John Page, Dudley Digges (patriot), Archibald Cary and Lewis Burwell, had been delayed until the following May. In the legislative session held during the spring of 1765, burgesses debated borrowing £100,000 sterling from Britain to lend within the colony. Shortly after Robinson died on May 11, 1766, burgess Bland proposed a similar bank with £200,000 to lend at 5% interest.

Colonial treasury records confirmed that Robinson had been using the paper money he was supposed to destroy (in his role as treasurer), and also lending out taxes collected by local sheriffs before depositing them in the treasury. Robinson lent the currency to his political supporters, as well as used it to pay his personal debts. In December 1766, a staggering report to the House of Burgesses indicated that Robinson's estate owed the colony over £100,000. After the "Robinson affair", the roles of speaker and treasurer were separated. Modern auditing established the embezzlement at £109,335 Virginia currency, very close to the estimate by Robert Carter Nicholas published in the Virginia Gazette of June 27, 1766. Moreover, records ultimately showed that, of the lawyers, judges and sureties consenting to Pendleton and his co-executors being appointed, only Baylor Walker owed the Speaker no money at the time of his death. The others collectively owed the estate more than £10,000. Archibald Cary, whom some had accused along with Pendleton and Digges of whitewashing the matter, owed the estate nearly £4,000.

The executors kept the debtors' names secret for decades, despite political pressure. Pendleton was one of few Virginia lawyers in this era (during which the legislature established strict attorney fee schedules) to become wealthy, and he became a respected judge after statehood. The largest debtor/beneficiary was William Byrd III, who had borrowed nearly £15,000 from Robinson. During Pendleton's debt collection efforts, Byrd stopped attempting to restrict settlement near his family's long-established trading post and six plantations near the falls of the James River. After months of advertising lot sales proved unsuccessful, in November 1768, Byrd held a lottery at Williamsburg and sold off land known as Shockoe that became the core of Richmond's business district. The Robinson estate was also owed £8,085 by the Lead Mine Company, a venture by Robinson, governor Fauquier, Byrd and Robinson's father-in-law John Chiswell, to develop lead deposits along the New River in what later became Wythe County, Virginia. Chiswell had discovered the outcroppings circa 1756, and Byrd established a fort during the French and Indian war to protect that area, but it had not been developed before Robinson's death. After Virginia declared its independence, the commonwealth operated the lead mine, which became an important military supplier for the patriot cause. Despite pressure from the Assembly to settle the estate, by November 1769, the administrators had only repaid the Treasury about £21,000, and acknowledged a debt of a further £101,508, so Pendleton liquidated Robinson's former residence and some slaves, although he allowed Robinson's widow, who had married Colonel Griffin, to purchase considerable amounts at the estate sale, without requiring security.

Richard Henry Lee, who had campaigned unsuccessfully to succeed Robinson, provoked particular ire from aristocrats, especially the anonymous beneficiaries of Robinson's scheme. Enmity from that episode may have led Carter Braxton to engineer Lee's removal from the Continental Congress in 1777. Braxton owed the estate 3,848 pounds at Robinson's death, and his father George Braxton's estate owed 3,256 pounds.

During and after the Revolutionary War, Pendleton allowed certain debtor beneficiaries to repay in depreciated currency, which led to a famous legal decision by George Wythe. In 'Page v. Pendleton,' Wythe upheld the British debt repayment provision of the 1783 federal peace treaty over Virginia state law which allowed payment in such currency.

== Sources ==
- Mays, Edmund Pendleton vol. I chapter 11 and Appendices II-VI.
- Mayer, Henry. A Son of Thunder, Patrick Henry and the American Republic. New York: Franklin Watts, 1986.
