= Noble Furnace, Virginia =

- Unincorporated community
- Location within Virginia Location within the United States
- Coordinates: 36°48′33″N 81°05′48″W
- Country: United States
- State: Virginia
- County: Wythe
- Elevation: 2,274 ft (693 m)
- Time zone: UTC-5 (Eastern (EST))
  - Summer (DST): UTC-4 (EDT)
- GNIS feature ID: 1493350

Noble Furnace is an unincorporated community in Wythe County, Virginia, United States. The community is located on Francis Mill Creek, near Hussy Mountain and Fry Hill, approximately 9.6 miles (15.4 km) south of Wytheville. Noble Furnace is the location of a former iron furnace of the same name (also called the Irondale Furnace) constructed in 1880 or 1881. The cold blast furnace was steam powered and its stack was constructed of stone. The furnace was owned by the Norma Iron Company and utilized primarily limestone ore which was transported from nearby deposits to the furnace via tramway.
