= Rackettown, Virginia =

- Unincorporated community
- Location within Virginia Location within the United States
- Coordinates: 36°51′48″N 80°49′44″W
- Country: United States
- State: Virginia
- County: Wythe
- Elevation: 2,155 ft (657 m)
- Time zone: UTC-5 (Eastern (EST))
  - Summer (DST): UTC-4 (EDT)
- Area code: 276
- GNIS feature ID: 1472928

Rackettown is an unincorporated community in Wythe County, Virginia, United States. Rackettown is 15.3 miles (24.6 km) east-southeast of Wytheville.
