= Garnett Moore =

American politician (1914–1984)

Member of the Virginia House of Delegates from the Pulaski County district
- In office 1954–1971
- Succeeded by: Jefferson Stafford

Personal details
- Born: Garnett St. Clair Moore; September 9, 1914 Max Meadows, Virginia, U.S.
- Died: July 25, 1984 (aged 69) Roanoke, Virginia, U.S.
- Resting place: Shiloh Cemetery; Pulaski County, Virginia, U.S.
- Party: Democratic
- Spouse: Virginia Kathleen Kersey (m. 1936)
- Children: 1
- Education: College of William and Mary
- Alma mater: University of Virginia School of Law (LLB)
- Occupation: Politician; lawyer

Garnett St. Clair Moore (September 9, 1914 – July 25, 1984) was an American politician and lawyer from Virginia. He served as a member of the Virginia House of Delegates from 1954 to 1971.

== Early life and education ==
Garnett St. Clair Moore was born on September 9, 1914, to Lelia (née Mahady) and Damon St. Clair Moore, in Max Meadows, Wythe County, Virginia. His grandfather was a magistrate. He attended Max Meadows High School. He attended the College of William and Mary.

In 1933, Moore moved to Pulaski and worked at Coleman Furniture. He then worked several jobs there, including at the Virginia Maid Hosiery Mills. He also played semi-professional baseball in the summer. In 1943, he joined the U.S. Navy. During World War II, he was involved in shore patrol. He left the Navy in 1946. He earned a Bachelor of Laws from the University of Virginia School of Law in 1948.

== Career ==
In 1948, Moore moved back to Pulaski and practiced law there. He became the town's attorney the same year. He served in that role for 35 years. He also became town attorney for Dublin and served in that role until his death.

Moore was a Democrat. He served in the Virginia House of Delegates from 1954 to 1971. He was chairman of the courts of justice committee from 1966 to 1971. In 1971, he lost his bid for re-election to Jefferson Stafford and returned to practicing law.

== Personal life ==
Moore married Virginia Kathleen Kersey on October 29, 1936. They had a son, Barry St. Clair. Moore was a member of First United Methodist Church.

Moore died on July 25, 1984, at Community Hospital of Roanoke Valley in Roanoke. He was buried in Shiloh Cemetery in Pulaski County.
