= Star Cave, Virginia =

- Unincorporated community
- Location within Virginia Location within the United States
- Coordinates: 36°54′55″N 80°47′21″W
- Country: United States
- State: Virginia
- County: Wythe
- Elevation: 2,198 ft (670 m)
- Time zone: UTC−5 (Eastern (EST))
  - Summer (DST): UTC−4 (EDT)
- GNIS feature ID: 1501369

Star Cave is an unincorporated community in Wythe County, Virginia, United States. Star Cave is located approximately 16.5 miles (26.6 km) east-southeast of Wytheville. The community is situated on Gardner Road, just east of the New River.
