= Cornett Archeological Site =

Archaeological site in Virginia, United States

- Cornett Archeological Site (44WY1)
- U.S. National Register of Historic Places
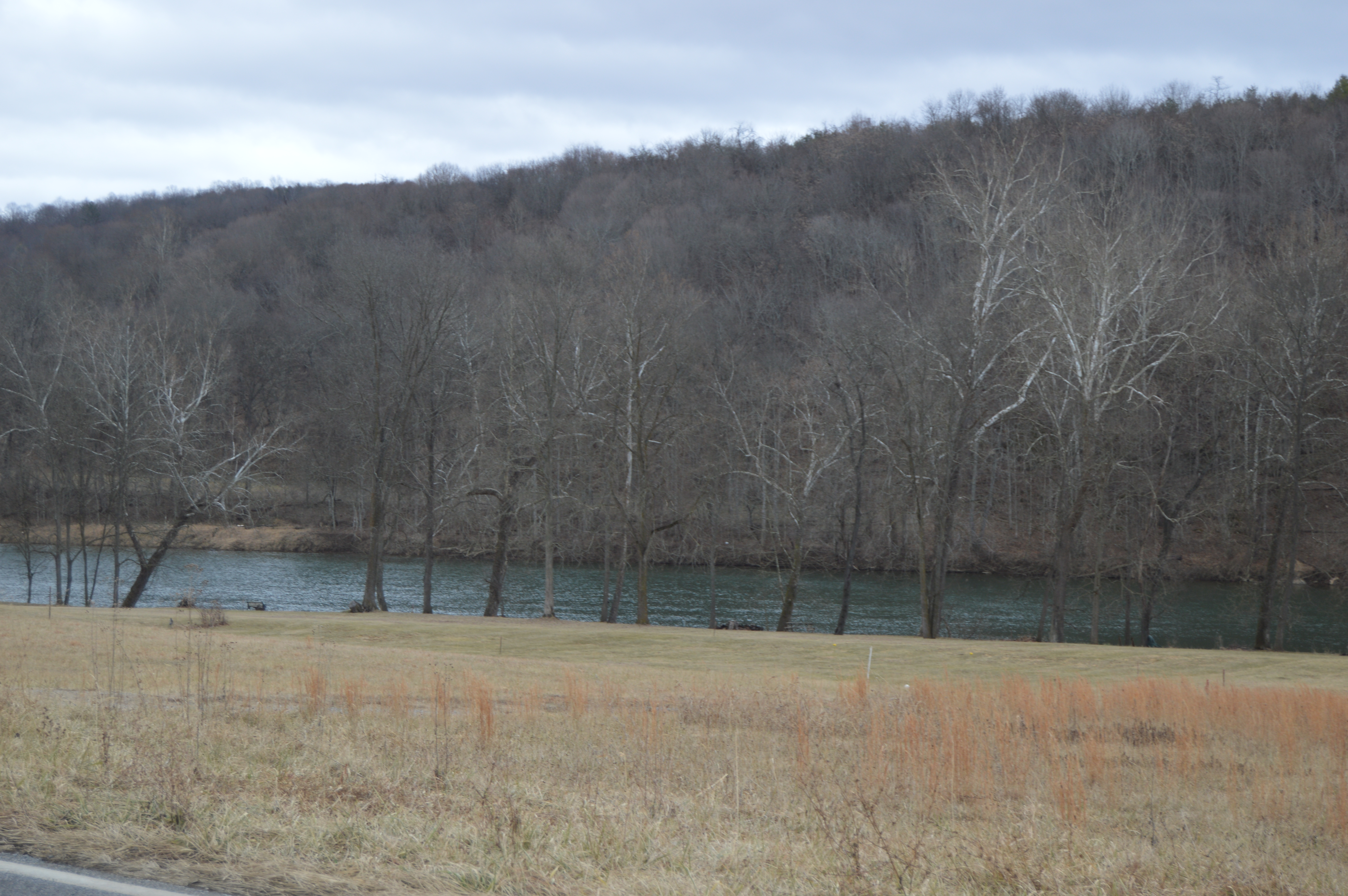
- Overview of the site
- Nearest city: Austinville, Virginia
- Area: 5.5 acres (2.2 ha)
- Built: 1000
- NRHP reference No.: 83003320
- Added to NRHP: September 29, 1983

The Cornett Archeological Site (44WY1) is a prehistoric and historic Native American site in Wythe County, Virginia. The site is located on a terrace above the north bank of the New River, about 0.5 miles (0.80 km) outside Austinville. It is a village site, which was occupied during the Late Woodland period, and offers evidence of significantly earlier occupation. The village had a well-defined plaza area, and may have been surrounded by a palisade. Formal excavations of the site have recovered pottery sherds, stone tools, and ceramic and metal trade items. The site has also been subjected to excavations by local collectors.

The site was listed on the National Register of Historic Places in 1983.

== See also ==
- National Register of Historic Places listings in Wythe County, Virginia
