= Martin Site =

Martin Site may refer to:

- Martin Site, one of the National Register of Historic Places listings in Powell County, Kentucky
- Martin Site (Fosters Falls, Virginia)
