= McGavock Family Cemetery =

Historic cemetery in Virginia, United States

- U.S. National Register of Historic Places
- Virginia Landmarks Register
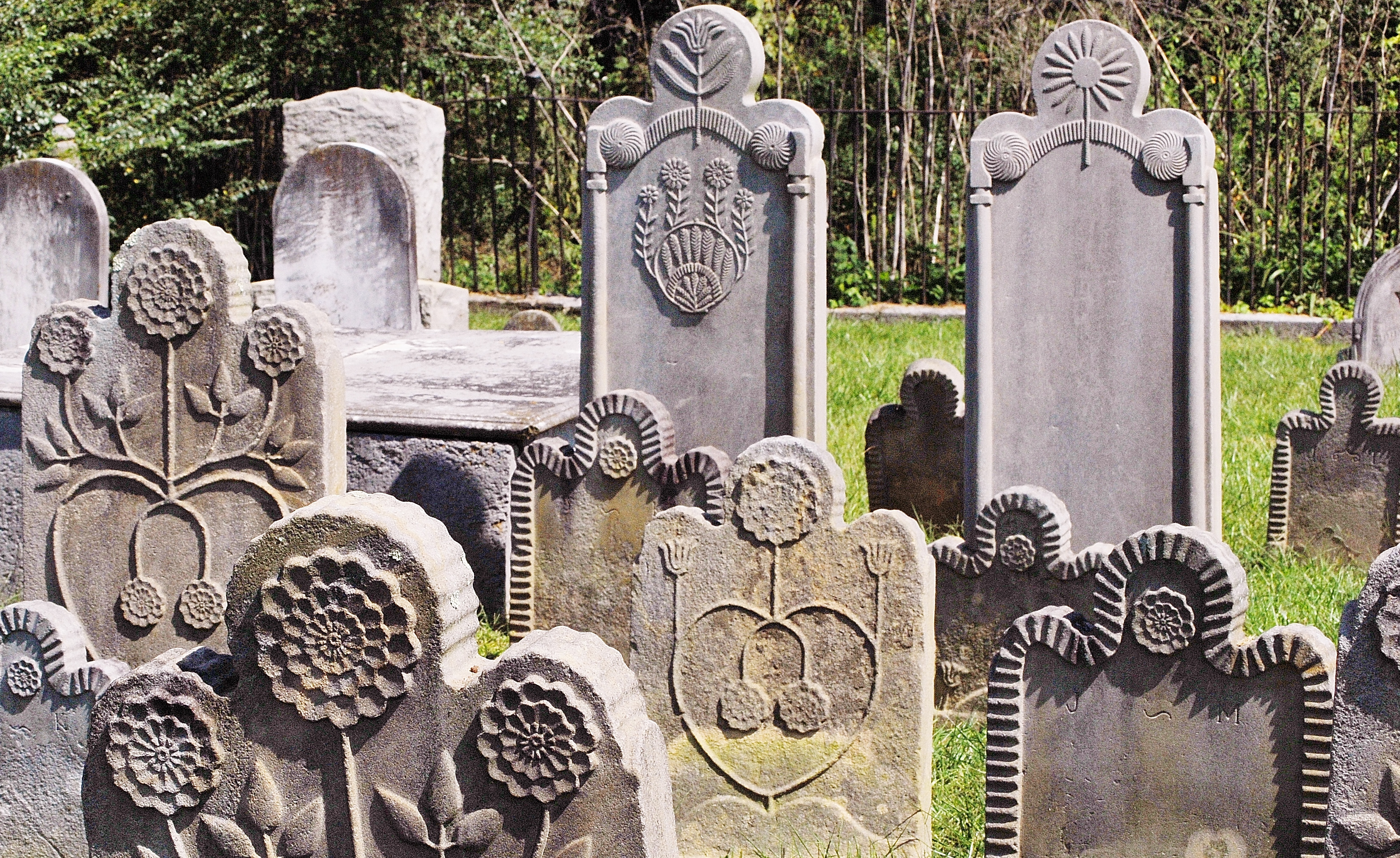

- Location within Virginia Location within the United States
- Location: NW of Rural Retreat, near Fort Chiswell, Virginia
- Coordinates: 36°56′51″N 80°55′30″W
- Area: less than one acre
- Built: 1812
- Built by: Krone, Laurence
- Architectural style: Germanic
- NRHP reference No.: 79003098
- VLR No.: 098-0022

Significant dates
- Added to NRHP: June 22, 1979
- Designated VLR: March 20, 1979

McGavock Family Cemetery is a historic family cemetery located near Fort Chiswell, Wythe County, Virginia. It is located on a hill above The Mansion at Fort Chiswell. The cemetery includes approximately about 15 Germanic sandstone monuments dating from 1812 to the late-1830s.

It was listed on the National Register of Historic Places in 1980.
