= Jackson Ferry Shot Tower =

- Shot Tower
- U.S. National Register of Historic Places
- Virginia Landmarks Register
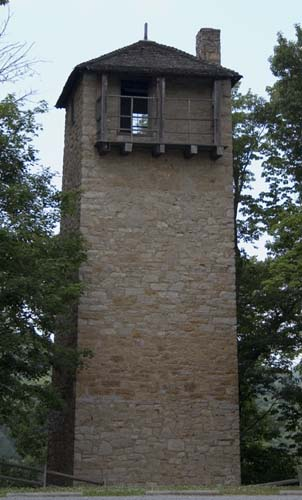

- Location within Virginia Location within the United States
- Location: W of jct. of Rte. 608 and U.S. 52, Shot Tower Historical State Park, near Max Meadows, Virginia
- Coordinates: 36°52′12″N 80°52′14″W
- Area: 0 acres (0 ha)
- Built: 1807
- NRHP reference No.: 69000286
- VLR No.: 098-0016

Significant dates
- Added to NRHP: October 1, 1969
- Designated VLR: November 5, 1968

The Jackson Ferry Shot Tower is a 75-foot (23 m) tall tower used for manufacturing lead shot located in Wythe County, Virginia and now adjacent to the New River Trail State Park, a lineal rail trail park connecting the historic towns of Pulaski and Galax, Virginia.

As one of the few remaining shot towers in the United States, the Jackson Ferry tower was constructed by Thomas Jackson and is the centerpiece of the Shot Tower Historical State Park. Construction began on the tower shortly after the American Revolutionary War and was completed in 1807. The tower was listed on the National Register of Historic Places on October 1, 1969.

== Manufacturing process ==
Shot towers or shot factories were designed and constructed to manufacture lead shot for firearms. At the top of the tower a firewood furnace melted lead with arsenic, which was poured through a sieve; forming drops of lead corresponding to the size of the sieve. The lead droplets would then fall 150 feet to become spherical and cool sufficiently to become rigid. At the bottom of the tower was large kettle of water for the shot to land in, in order to complete the cooling process and provide a soft enough landing to keep it from deforming. The finished shot was then marketed to hunters, traders and merchants.

== Design ==
The Wythe County Shot Tower is unique for several reasons. Unlike most other shot towers, which were constructed of brick, this shot tower was built of limestone. The 2.5-foot-thick solid stone walls not only made the structure stronger, but kept its interior temperature cooler and more consistent, improving the quality of the shot it produced. Designers also used the local terrain to reduce the height of the tower by building the tower on the edge of a cliff and digging a 75-foot vertical shaft to accomplish the 150-foot vertical constraint. Access to the bottom of the shaft was made by a horizontal adit that opened up near the shore of the New River.

== Controversy ==
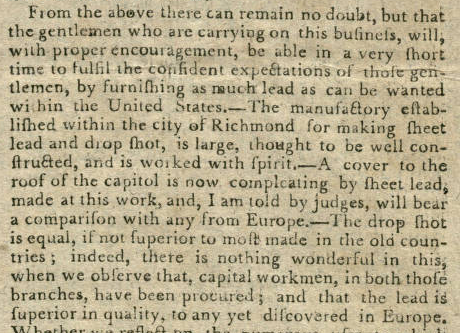
Article detailing Moses Austin & Co's shot factory in Richmond, VA

There have been claims that the Jackson Ferry Shot Tower predates the recognized year of 1807, and that Moses Austin & his brother, Stephen Austin (not to be confused with Moses's son, Stephen F. Austin, "Father of Texas") were producing drop shot in Wythe County prior to 1800 at the Jackson Ferry Shot Tower.

Those who hold this view reference newspapers of the era; however, the newspapers identify factories in cities such as Lynchburg and Richmond, VA, both located on the James River in the Chesapeake Bay watershed, and likely don't relate to what would be the Jackson Ferry Shot Tower, located on the New River in the Ohio River watershed. Letters from the time also very explicitly identify Richmond as the location of the factories. The confusion likely stems from Moses Austin & Co. owning the Austinville lead mines, near where they would build the shot factory in Jackson Ferry.

== See also ==
- National Register of Historic Places listings in Wythe County, Virginia
