= Reed Creek Mill =

- U.S. National Register of Historic Places
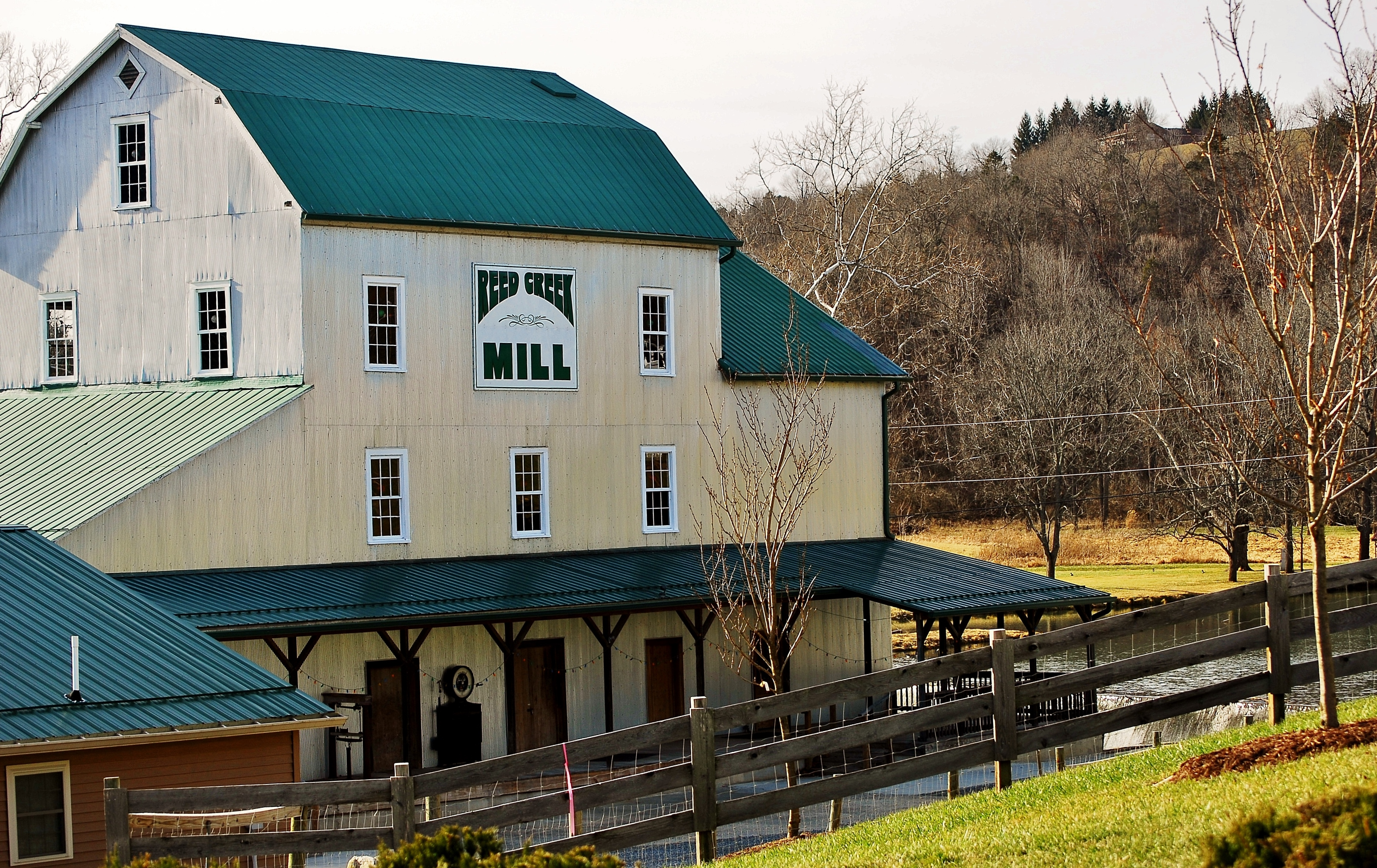

- Location within Virginia Location within the United States
- Location: 1565 S. Church St., Wytheville, Virginia
- Coordinates: 36°56′9″N 81°4′28″W
- Area: 4.8 acres (1.9 ha)
- Built: 1902
- Architectural style: Late Victorian
- NRHP reference No.: 16000802
- Added to NRHP: November 22, 2016

Reed Creek Mill is a historic grist mill at 1565 South Church Street in Wytheville, Virginia. The property includes a c. 1902 wood-frame mill building, a mill dam and raceway, and a c. 1950 storage building. The site has seen industrial use as a mill since 1858; its first mill was torn down late in the 19th century. The present mill building served the local agricultural community until 2004, and has since undergone restoration.

The mill was listed on the National Register of Historic Places in 2016.

The mill is privately owned and not open to the public.

== See also ==
- National Register of Historic Places listings in Wythe County, Virginia
