= Barren Springs, Virginia =

Unincorporated community in the U.S. state of Virginia

- Unincorporated community
- Location within Virginia Location within the United States
- Coordinates: 36°54′29″N 80°48′02″W
- Country: United States
- State: Virginia
- County: Wythe
- Elevation: 2,047 ft (624 m)

Population (2018)
  - Total: 1,209
  - Density: 152/sq mi (59/km^{2})
- Time zone: UTC-5 (Eastern (EST))
  - Summer (DST): UTC-4 (EDT)
- ZIP code: 24313
- Area code: 276
- GNIS feature ID: 1494823

Barren Springs is an unincorporated community in Wythe County, Virginia, United States. It is located along Virginia State Route 100, 10.7 miles (17.2 km) north-northwest of Hillsville and just over 11 miles south of Pulaski. The area is dominated by the New River and its various tributaries as well as the mountains and hills that rise from their banks.

== History ==
The area was first settled by various tribes of First Nations peoples, particularly the Catawba and Cherokee. European settlers arrived in the late 18th century and were mostly of Scottish, Irish, and German ancestry.

Early settlers were mostly farmers though industry came to the area in the late 19th and early 20th century with lead mines opening and employing local residents. The railroad soon followed and brought with it the building of several hotels and a store. A local school and churches were soon organized as well. The lead mines remained a dominant economic force in the area through the mid 20th century when they were shuttered.

A one-room school served the area until the early 20th century when a larger school was built in the Patterson community. That school closed in the mid 20th century when Wythe County consolidated schools for the area at Jackson Memorial Elementary School, Austinville Elementary and Middle School, and Fort Chiswell High School. Austinville Elementary and Middle School was replaced by Fort Chiswell Middle School in 2001.

== Economy ==
Barren Springs continues to have an active agricultural industry with many local farms producing beef cattle, hogs, corn, and apples. In recent years, tourism related to the New River has become a major force in the local economy. Two local general stores serve the area with gas, groceries, and short-order restaurants. Dollar General opened a store in Barren Springs in late 2017 and Family Dollar followed suit in late 2018. Negotiations continue with several other retailers and restaurants about future development.

Barren Springs has a post office with ZIP code 24313. The community had a population of 1,087 residents as of 2018. A 2026 estimate placed the population of the zip code at 1,209.
