= Barbara Stafford =

American politician (born 1953)

Member of the Virginia House of Delegates from the 5th district
- In office November 26, 1990 – January 1991
- Preceded by: Jefferson Stafford
- Succeeded by: G. C. Jennings

Personal details
- Born: May 7, 1953 (age 73) Giles County, Virginia
- Party: Republican
- Spouse: Jefferson Stafford (d. 1990)
- Occupation: Homemaker

Barbara M. Stafford (born May 7, 1953) is a former member of the Virginia House of Delegates. She won a special election to succeed her husband, Jeff Stafford, who died in office in 1990. Her district included parts of Bland, Giles and Tazewell counties.

In the subsequent 1991 general election, Democrat Grover Jennings defeated Republican Barnes Lee Kidd of Tazewell, but the results were reversed in the 1993 general election, and in 1995 Democrat John H. Tate Jr. defeated Kidd.
