= Jefferson Stafford =

American politician (1939–1990)

Member of the Virginia House of Delegates from the Giles and Pulaski Counties district
- In office 1972 – July 24, 1990
- Preceded by: Garnett Moore
- Succeeded by: Barbara Stafford

Personal details
- Born: April 20, 1939 Giles County, Virginia
- Died: July 24, 1990 (aged 51)
- Party: Republican
- Spouse: Barbara Stafford
- Education: College of William and Mary (BA); University of Virginia (LLB)
- Occupation: Attorney

Chester Jefferson "Jeff" Stafford (April 20, 1939 – July 24, 1990) was a Virginia lawyer and politician. Elected in 1971 as a Republican member of the Virginia House of Delegates, he represented what had been Virginia's 12th district but was renumbered Virginia's 5th district after the 1972 census, which included parts of Carroll, Giles, Montgomery, and Pulaski counties; and the city of Radford from 1972 until his death.

== Biography ==
Born in Giles County on April 20, 1939, Stafford was educated at the College of William and Mary and received a B.A. degree, and then he received a law degree from the University of Virginia.

Stafford served 2 years in the U.S. Army infantry in Korea, then practiced law in Pearisburg (the seat of Giles County) and surrounding areas in southwest Virginia. He was also active in the Jaycees, Masons and Methodist Church.

Redistricting after the 1970 census split the southwest Virginia districts represented by Democrats Archibald A. Campbell of Wytheville, Virginia and Garnett Moore of Pulaski, Virginia. Campbell continued to represent Bland County, but now with the city of Galax, Virginia and Wythe and Grayson Counties as the 4th District. However, Giles County was now grouped with Pulaski county as the 5th District, and voters elected Republican Stafford, who defeated Moore (who had represented Pulaski since 1954) by a 54% to 45% margin. Stafford won re-election nine times against various Democrats (and twice without opposition), although in subsequent reapportionments Craig County would be added in 1974, and then the city of Radford. The post-1980 reapportionment removed Craig County but added Bland County and parts of Tazewell County.

Stafford challenged incumbent Democrat Rick Boucher to represent Virginia's 9th district in the U.S. Congress, but lost narrowly in 1984.

His wife Barbara, a fellow Giles county native and homemaker as well as president of the Pearisburg Junior Women's club, succeeded to the seat for one term upon his death in office in 1990.
