= Foster Falls Historic District =

Historic district in Virginia, United States

- U.S. National Register of Historic Places
- U.S. Historic district
- Virginia Landmarks Register
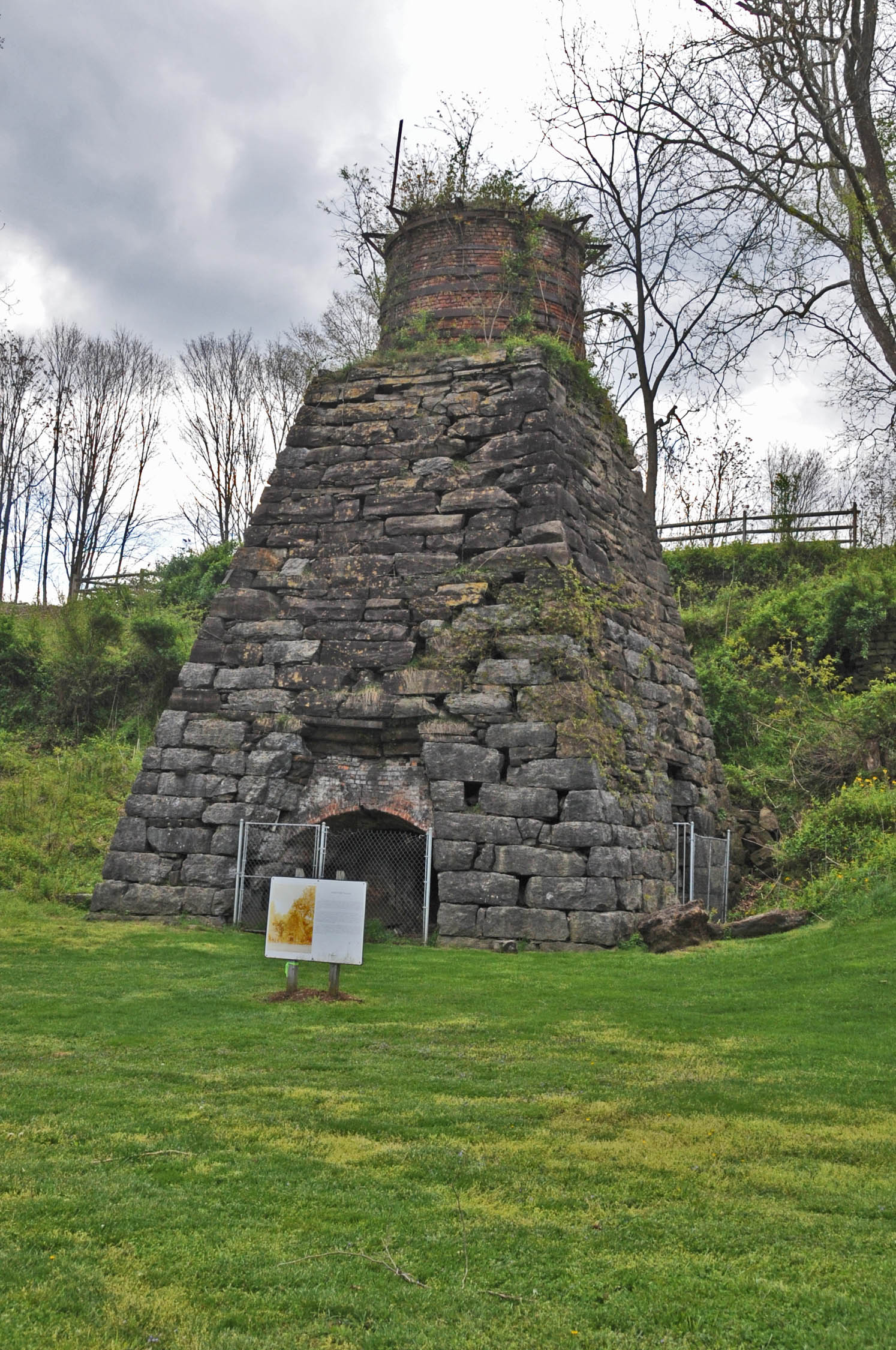
- Foster Falls Furnace, April 2012

- Location within Virginia Location within the United States
- Location: New River Trail State Park, 176 Orphanage Dr., near Max Meadows, Virginia
- Coordinates: 36°53′1″N 80°51′20″W
- Area: 16.5 acres (6.7 ha)
- Built: 1881
- Architect: Graham and Robinson
- Architectural style: Late Victorian
- NRHP reference No.: 09000925
- VLR No.: 098-5141

Significant dates
- Added to NRHP: November 12, 2009
- Designated VLR: September 17, 2005

Foster Falls Historic District is a national historic district located near Max Meadows, Wythe County, Virginia. The district encompasses 12 contributing buildings, 2 contributing sites, and 3 contributing structures in the village of Foster Falls. They are primarily industrial and commercial buildings and structures built in the late-19th century. They include the iron furnace stack, the rail bed and frame railroad passenger station (c. 1887), a general store building, and a combination gristmill/sawmill. The district includes the Foster Falls Hotel, a late-Victorian style brick building. The hotel property includes two brick dependencies associated with an orphanage that occupied the hotel building beginning in 1938. It now serves as the headquarters of the New River Trail State Park.

It was listed on the National Register of Historic Places in 2009.
