= Zion Evangelical Lutheran Church Cemetery =

Historic cemetery in Wythe County, Virginia, US

- U.S. National Register of Historic Places
- U.S. Historic district
- Virginia Landmarks Register
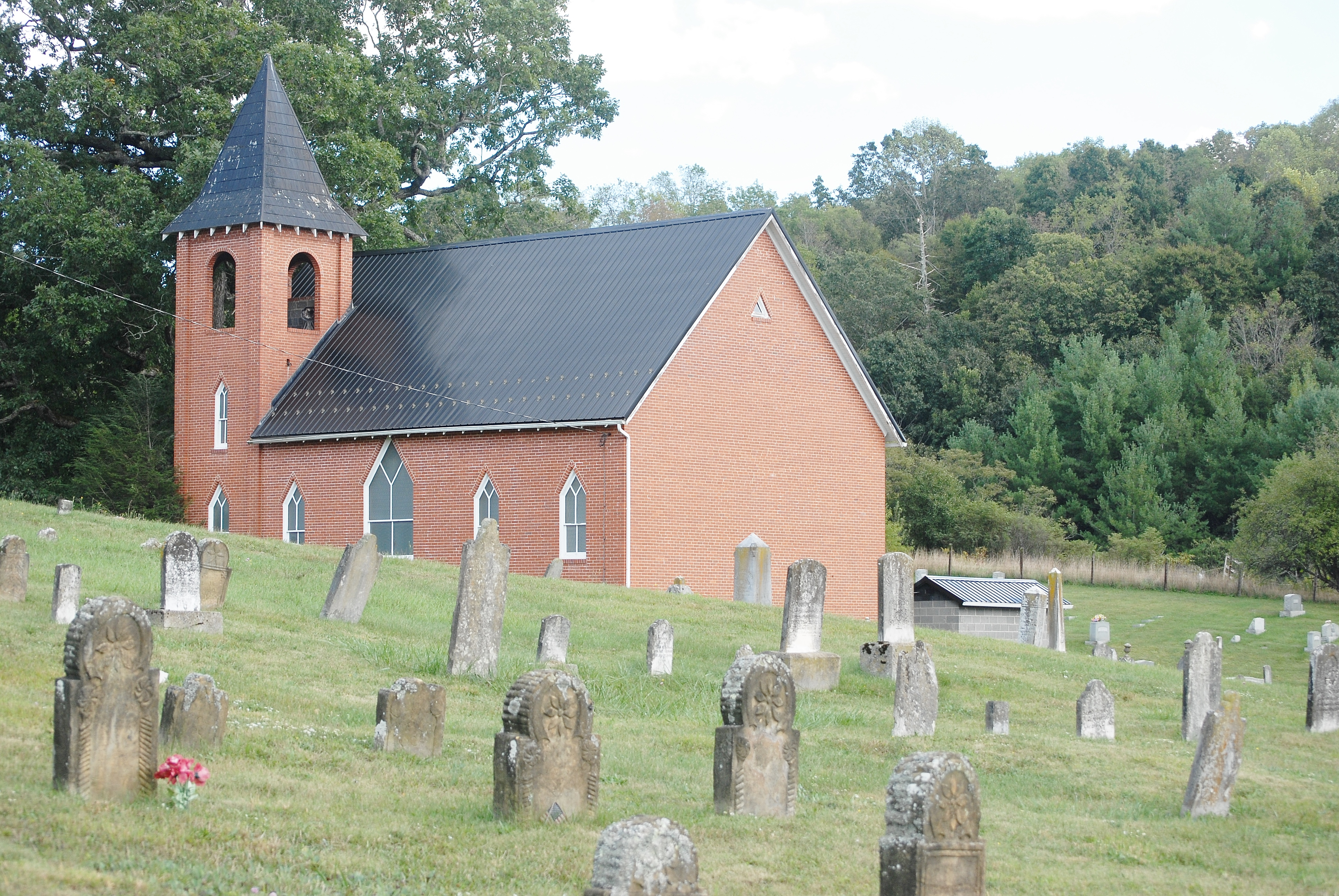

- Location within Virginia Location within the United States
- Location: NW of Speedwell, near Speedwell, Virginia
- Coordinates: 36°50′28″N 81°13′22″W
- Area: 3 acres (1.2 ha)
- Built: 1835–1840
- Architectural style: Germanic
- NRHP reference No.: 79003099
- VLR No.: 098-0028

Significant dates
- Added to NRHP: February 1, 1979
- Designated VLR: April 19, 1977

Zion Evangelical Lutheran Church Cemetery is a historic Evangelical Lutheran cemetery and national historic district located near Speedwell, Wythe County, Virginia. The cemetery includes approximately 250–300 total gravestones. Forty two of the stones have dates ranging from the 1790s to 1840, but all were carved between about 1835 to 1840. It is likely that a skilled carver moved to the area in the mid-1830s and provided stones for many graves, which formerly had been marked with improvised stone or wooden markers, then completed his work by 1840. The thick sandstone markers are Germanic stones with surviving inscriptions.

It was listed on the National Register of Historic Places in 1979.
