= Maj. David Graham House =

Historic house in Virginia, United States

- U.S. National Register of Historic Places
- Virginia Landmarks Register
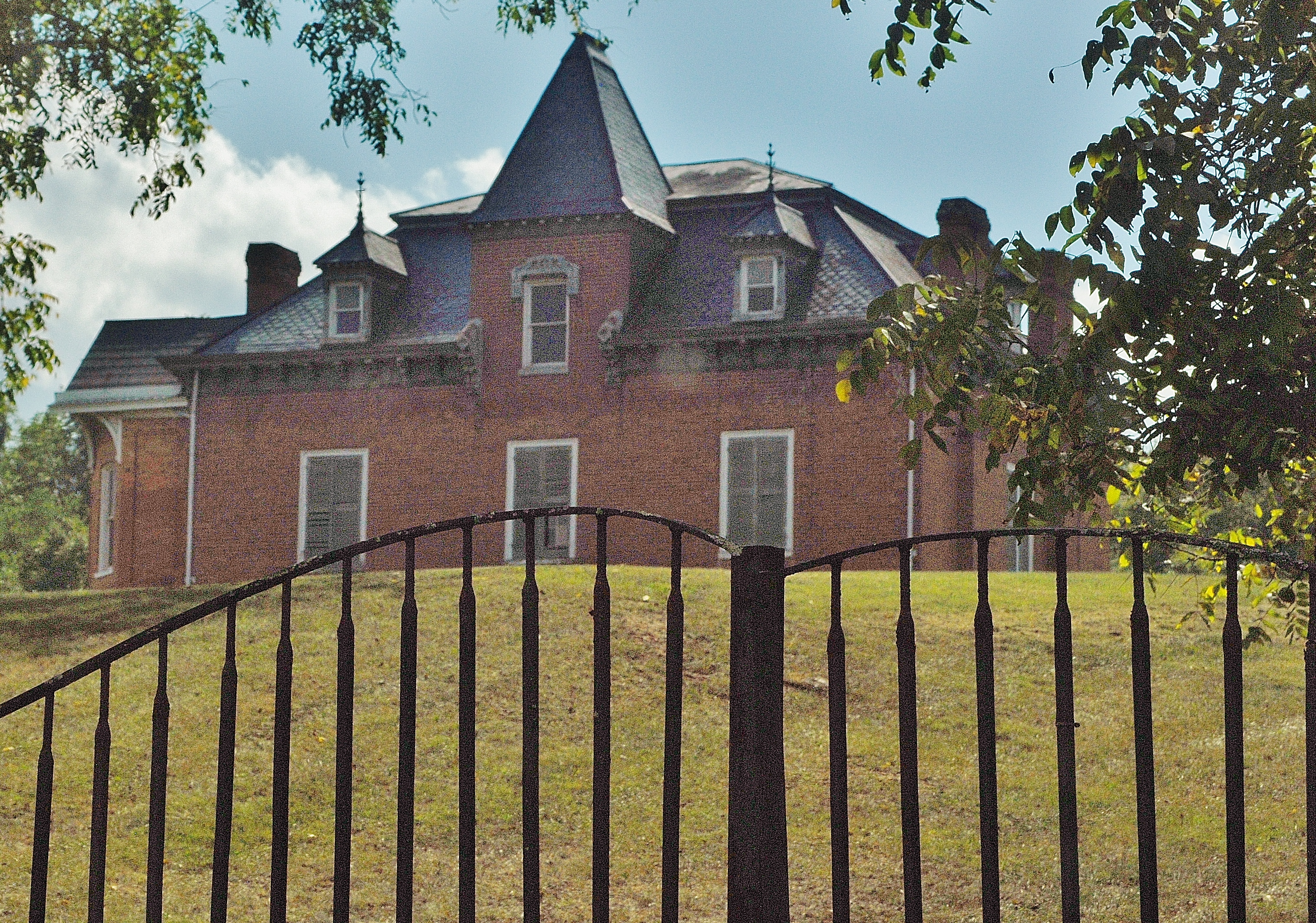

- Location within Virginia Location within the United States
- Location: VA 619 and 626, Fosters Falls, Virginia
- Coordinates: 36°54′56″N 80°52′19″W
- Area: 21 acres (8.5 ha)
- Built: c. 1840-c. 1890
- Architectural style: Mixed (more Than 2 Styles From Different Periods)
- NRHP reference No.: 85000300
- VLR No.: 098-0008

Significant dates
- Added to NRHP: February 14, 1985
- Designated VLR: December 11, 1984

Maj. David Graham House, also known as Cedar Run Farm, is a historic home located at Fosters Falls, Wythe County, Virginia. The house was built in four sections, beginning about 1840 and finishing about 1890. As such its design details reflect styles from late Federal to orientalized Queen Anne. The house is a 2 1/2-story, T-shaped, wood and brick structure of immense proportions. It is topped by a hipped roof with dormers and features a short hipped roofed tower. Also on the property are the contributing office and commissary, spring house, kitchen, and two barns.

It was listed on the National Register of Historic Places in 1985.
