= Shot Tower Historical State Park =

State park in Virginia, USA

Shot Tower State Park, Virginia, USA
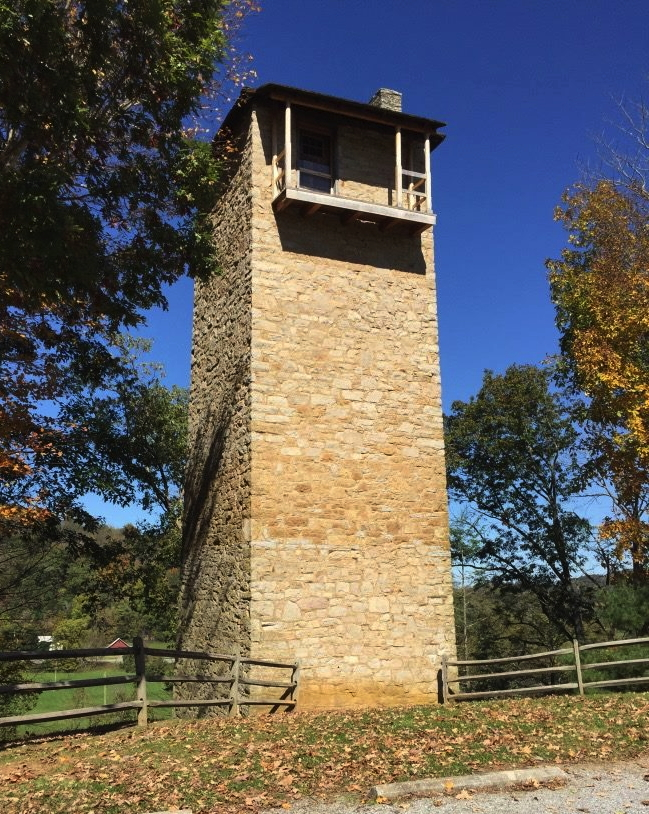
- Shot Tower Historical State Park

- Location within Virginia Location within the United States
- Location: 176 Orphanage Dr., Max Meadows, VA 24360
- Coordinates: 36°53′4″N 80°51′11″W
- Area: 10 acres (4.0 ha)
- Established: 1968
- Governing body: Virginia Department of Conservation and Recreation

Shot Tower Historical State Park is a state park located near the town of Austinville, Virginia. Its centerpiece is the Jackson Ferry Shot Tower, located along the New River, which was for many years used for the creation of ammunition. The tower is listed on the National Register of Historic Places.

== See also ==
- List of Virginia state parks
- List of Virginia state forests
