= Sanders Farm =

Historic house in Virginia, United States

- U.S. National Register of Historic Places
- Virginia Landmarks Register
- Location within Virginia Location within the United States
- Location: 3908 Fort Chiswell Rd., Max Meadows, Virginia
- Coordinates: 36°52′39″N 80°52′07″W
- Area: 170 acres (69 ha)
- Built: 1880
- Architectural style: Queen Anne
- NRHP reference No.: 03000454
- VLR No.: 098-0192

Significant dates
- Added to NRHP: May 22, 2003
- Designated VLR: March 19, 2003

Sanders Farm is a historic home and farm located at Max Meadows, Wythe County, Virginia. The Brick House was built about 1880, and is a two-story, T-shaped, Queen Anne-style brick farmhouse. It features ornamental gables and porches. Also on the property are the contributing cold frame with a stepped front parapet (c. 1900), a vaulted stone spring house, a one-story brick servants quarters (c. 1880), a cinder block store with an upstairs apartment and an accompanying privy (1950s), a frame vehicle repair shop (c. 1920s), a stone reservoir (1880s) two corn crib, a frame gambrel-roofed barn, a one-story tenant house (c. 1920), stone bridge abutments, and the site of the Hematite Iron Company Mine (late 1880s), a complex of rock formations and tram line beds.

It was listed on the National Register of Historic Places in 2003.
