= The Mansion at Fort Chiswell =

Historic house in Virginia, United States

- Fort Chiswell Mansion
- U.S. National Register of Historic Places
- Virginia Landmarks Register
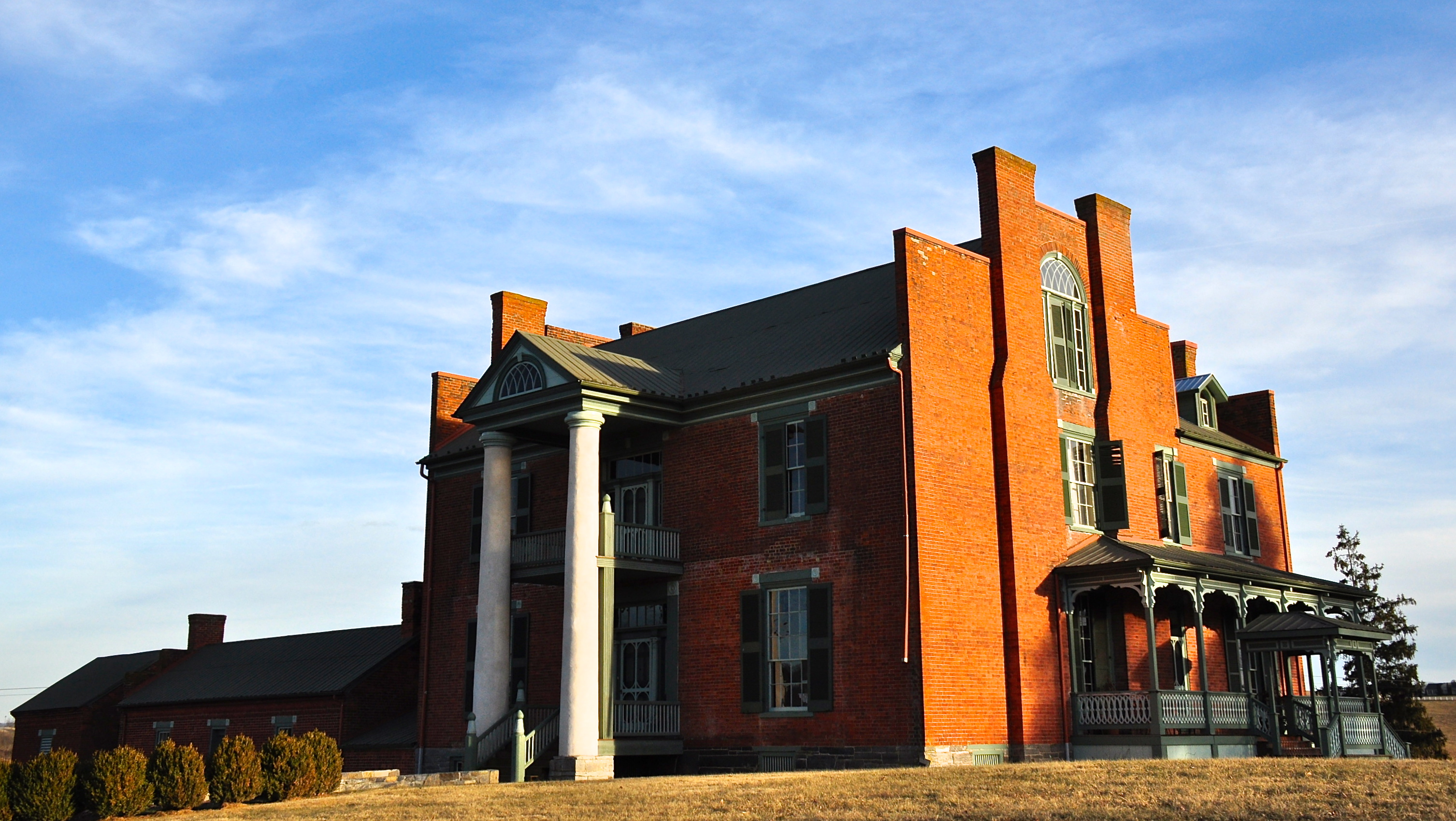
- The Mansion at Fort Chiswell, January 2014.

- Location within Virginia Location within the United States
- Location: 325 Factory Outlet Drive, near Max Meadows, Fort Chiswell, Virginia
- Coordinates: 36°56′42″N 80°56′13″W
- Area: 75 acres (30 ha)
- Built: 1839-1840
- Built by: Thorn, Lorain; Johnson, James
- Architectural style: Early Republic, Greek Revival, Roman Revival
- NRHP reference No.: 71000992
- VLR No.: 098-0005

Significant dates
- Added to NRHP: May 6, 1971
- Designated VLR: March 2, 1971

The Mansion at Fort Chiswell, also known as the McGavock Mansion and Fort Chiswell Mansion, is a historic home located at Fort Chiswell near Max Meadows, Wythe County, Virginia. It was constructed in 1839–1840, by Stephen and Joseph Cloyd McGavock, and is a two-story, Greek Revival style brick dwelling. The front facade features two-story diastyle portico composed of two provincial Greek Doric order columns supporting a pediment. It has a steep gable ends with slightly projecting end chimneys and one-story Italianate bracketed porches. It has a two-story rear ell with a frame gallery and an attached a one-story brick kitchen. It is a private residence, available for tours and events.

It was listed on the National Register of Historic Places in 1972.
