= Max Meadows, Virginia =

- CDP
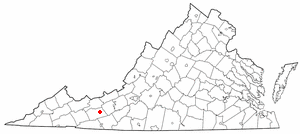
- Location of Max Meadows, Virginia
- Coordinates: 36°58′18″N 80°57′18″W
- Country: United States
- State: Virginia
- County: Wythe

Area
  - Total: 4.7 sq mi (12.1 km^{2})
  - Land: 4.7 sq mi (12.1 km^{2})
  - Water: 0 sq mi (0.0 km^{2})
- Elevation: 2,028 ft (618 m)

Population (2010)
  - Total: 562
  - Density: 120/sq mi (46.4/km^{2})
- Time zone: UTC−5 (Eastern (EST))
  - Summer (DST): UTC−4 (EDT)
- ZIP code: 24360
- Area code: 276
- FIPS code: 51-50312
- GNIS feature ID: 1485232

Max Meadows is a census-designated place (CDP) in Wythe County, Virginia, United States. As of the 2020 census, Max Meadows had a population of 553.

== History ==
The Foster Falls Historic District, Graham's Forge Mill, Sanders Farm, and Jackson Ferry Shot Tower are listed on the National Register of Historic Places.

== Geography ==
Max Meadows is located at 36°58′18″N 80°57′18″W (36.971634, −80.954886).

According to the United States Census Bureau, the CDP has a total area of 4.7 square miles (12.1 km^{2}), all land.

== Demographics ==
Historical population
Census	Pop.	Note	%±
2000	512		—
2020	553		—
U.S. Decennial Census; 2000 2010 2020

Max Meadows was first listed as a census designated place in the 2000 U.S. census.

As of the census of 2000, there were 512 people, 206 households, and 154 families residing in the CDP. The population density was 109.8 people per square mile (42.4/km^{2}). There were 235 housing units at an average density of 50.4/sq mi (19.5/km^{2}). The racial makeup of the CDP was 93.16% White, 3.91% African American, 0.20% Native American, 0.39% Asian, 1.37% from other races, and 0.98% from two or more races. Hispanic or Latino of any race were 1.56% of the population.

There were 206 households, out of which 27.2% had children under the age of 18 living with them, 55.3% were married couples living together, 13.1% had a female householder with no husband present, and 25.2% were non-families. 23.3% of all households were made up of individuals, and 10.7% had someone living alone who was 65 years of age or older. The average household size was 2.49 and the average family size was 2.91.

In the CDP, the population was spread out, with 19.9% under the age of 18, 10.5% from 18 to 24, 26.0% from 25 to 44, 27.7% from 45 to 64, and 15.8% who were 65 years of age or older. The median age was 41 years. For every 100 females, there were 88.9 males. For every 100 females age 18 and over, there were 91.6 males.

The median income for a household in the CDP was $22,300, and the median income for a family was $36,705. Males had a median income of $30,156 versus $20,398 for females. The per capita income for the CDP was $14,757. About 11.7% of families and 12.7% of the population were below the poverty line, including 18.0% of those under age 18 and none of those age 65 or over.

== Notable people ==
- Jim Archer, professional baseball player who was a left-handed pitcher for two seasons in major league baseball
- Toni Atkins, American politician.
- Garnett Moore (1914–1984), lawyer and state delegate
