= Fort Chiswell, Virginia =

- CDP
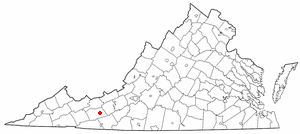
- Location of Fort Chiswell, Virginia
- Coordinates: 36°56′37″N 80°56′25″W
- Country: United States
- State: Virginia
- County: Wythe

Area
  - Total: 12.1 sq mi (31.4 km^{2})
  - Land: 12.1 sq mi (31.4 km^{2})
  - Water: 0 sq mi (0.0 km^{2})
- Elevation: 2,054 ft (626 m)

Population (2010)
  - Total: 939
  - Density: 77.5/sq mi (29.9/km^{2})
- Time zone: UTC−5 (Eastern (EST))
  - Summer (DST): UTC−4 (EDT)
- ZIP code: 24360
- Area code: 276
- FIPS code: 51-29040
- GNIS feature ID: 1495556

Fort Chiswell is a census-designated place (CDP) in Wythe County, Virginia, United States. As of the 2020 census, Fort Chiswell had a population of 876.

Fort Chiswell is located at the junction of Interstates 77 and 81. Going west from Fort Chiswell, drivers find themselves on a double wrong-way concurrency - one of few in the nation. Interstate 77 northbound is overlapped with Interstate 81 southbound, drivers will find themselves oriented the right way again when exiting I-81 back to I-77 north towards Charleston or south to Charlotte.

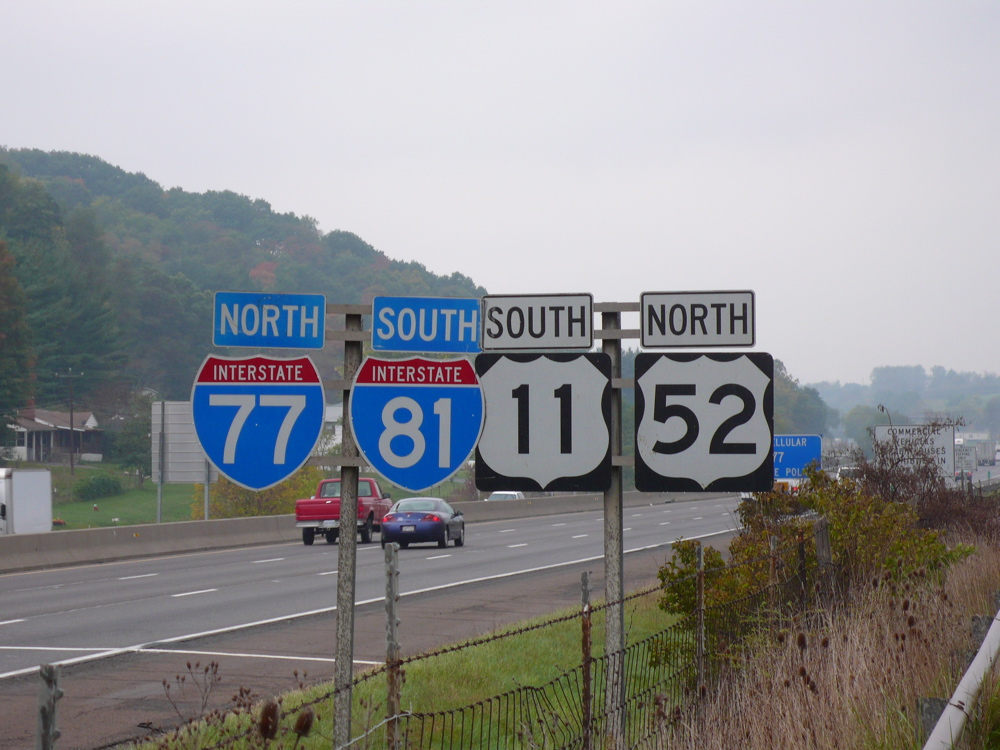
Sign on I-81/I-77 indicating a double wrong-way concurrency near Fort Chiswell, Virginia.

== History ==
The community name is derived from a frontier fort built in 1758 by William Byrd III as an outpost during the French and Indian War. The fort was named after Byrd's business partner Colonel John Chiswell, a prominent businessman with whom he owned and operated lead mines in the area. The fort, which was of strategic importance during the American Revolution as the guardpost over a small deposit of lead used to mold bullets, was situated at the junction of the Great Trading Path and the Richmond Road, near the New River. The fort fell into disrepair in the 18th century as both the county seat and courthouse were moved from Fort Chiswell to the county seat of Wytheville, 12 miles to the west. The remaining foundations of the Fort and its surrounding buildings were completely covered over during the construction of I-77 in Wythe County during the 1970s. There is a pyramid shaped historical marker of sandstone situated approximately 200 yards west-northwest of the fort's original location.

The Fort Chiswell Site, The Mansion at Fort Chiswell, and McGavock Family Cemetery are listed on the National Register of Historic Places.

The former Factory Merchants Outlet Mall, also known as Fort Chiswell Outlets, was located near Interstate 81 in Fort Chiswell. The outlet mall opened in 1988 and was later sold to New Plan Realty Trust in 1993. Its last stores had closed by around 2012, and the abandoned mall was damaged by a fire on April 6, 2018.

== Schools ==
Fort Chiswell has a few different forms of both private and public schools, however there is only one private school in the town, which is named 'Kiddy Centre' which only allows for pre-school and daycare education. The public sector has two schools including the Fort Chiswell Middle School (FCMS) and the Fort Chiswell High school (FCHS) which have been merged into one secular school building. The current principals there are for the middle school are Tammy J. Watson and Vice Principal Chelsea R. Buchanan. Current Principals of the High School are James C. Suma and vice principal Holly L. Luper.

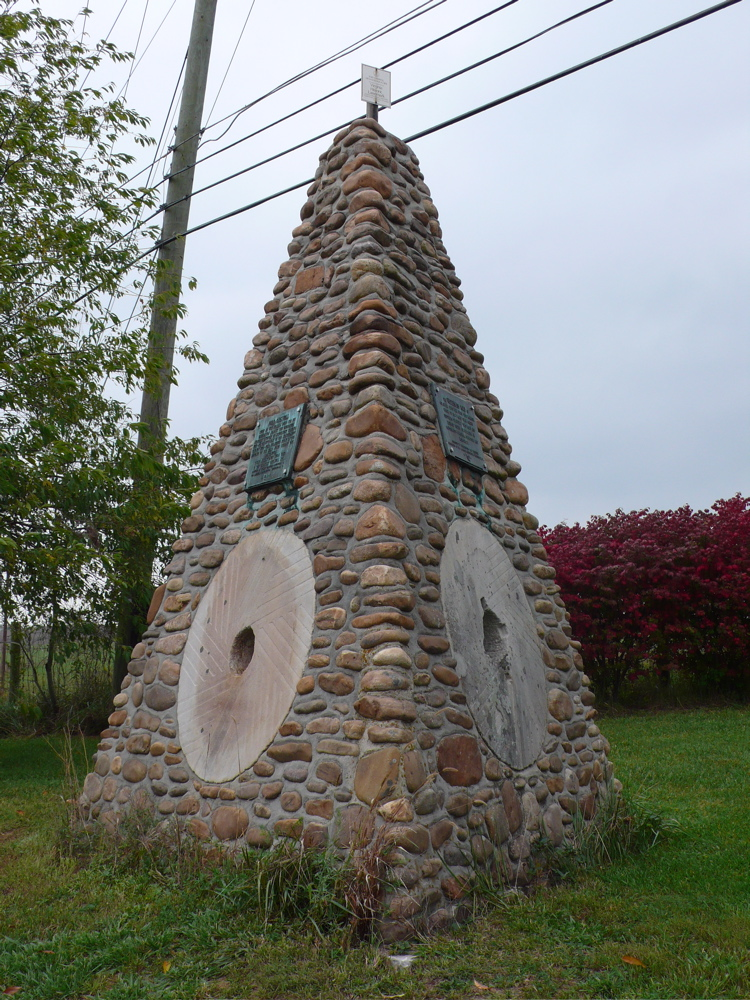
The Fort Chiswell Historic Marker near the site of the original fort in Wythe County, Virginia.

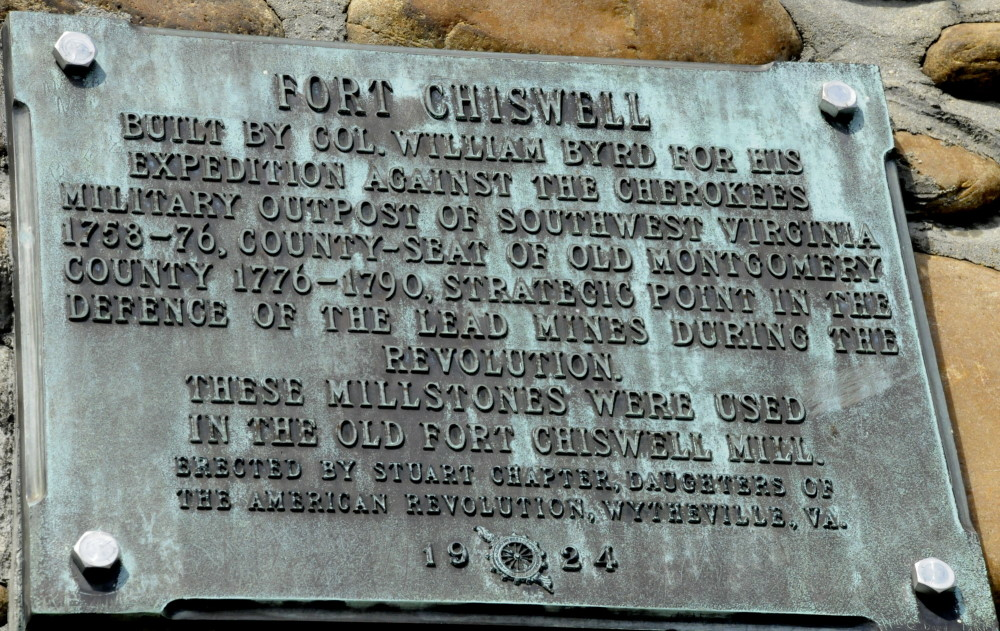
Ft. Chiswell plaque on the above Historic Marker.

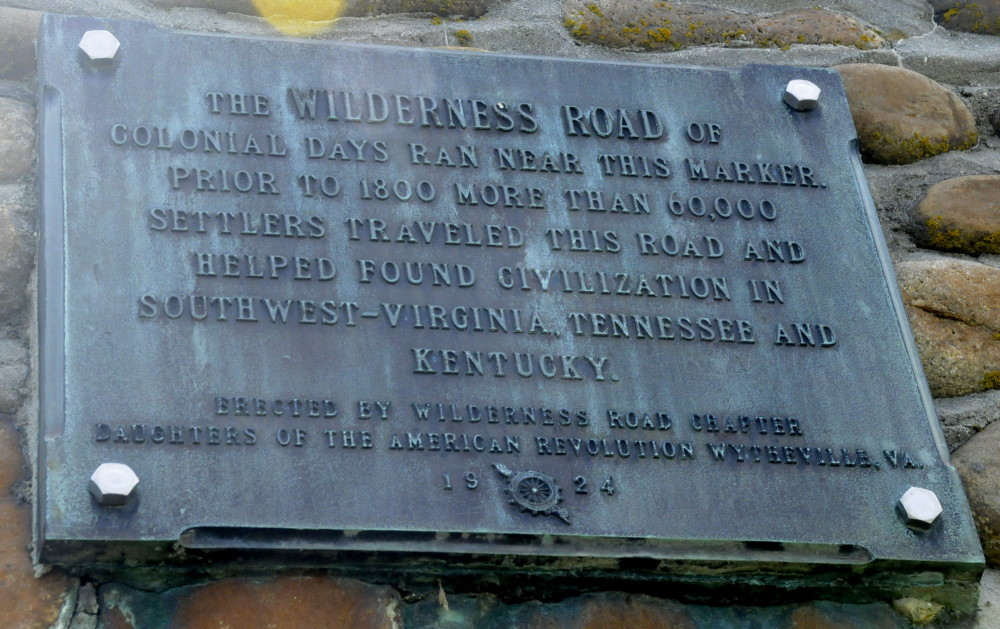
Wilderness Road plaque on the above Historic Marker.

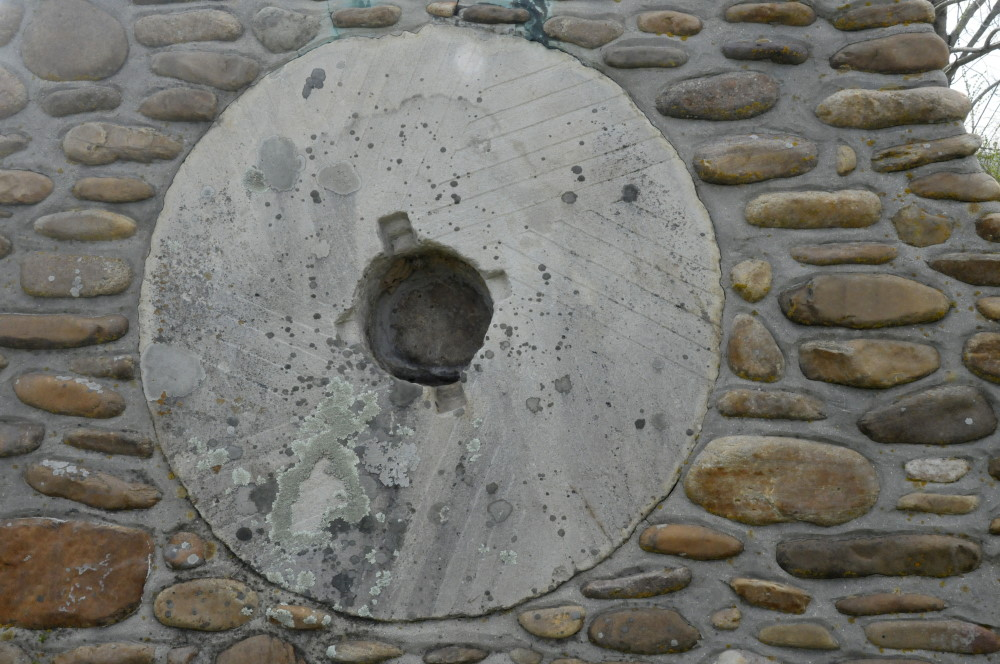
One of three millstones from the mill at old Ft. Chiswell which are mounted on the above Historic Marker.

== Geography ==
Fort Chiswell is located at 36°56′37″N 80°56′25″W (36.943670, −80.940335).According to the United States Census Bureau, the CDP has a total area of 12.1 square miles (31.3 km^{2}), all land.

== Demographics ==
Historical population
Census	Pop.	Note	%±
2000	911		—
2020	876		—
U.S. Decennial Census; 2000 2010 2020

Fort Chiswell was first listed as a census designated place in the 2000 U.S. census.

As of the census of 2000, there were 911 people, 357 households, and 263 families residing in the CDP. The population density was 75.3 people per square mile (29.1/km^{2}). There were 380 housing units at an average density of 31.4/sq mi (12.1/km^{2}). The racial makeup of the CDP was 98.02% White, 0.77% African American, 0.11% Native American, 0.11% from other races, and 0.99% from two or more races. Hispanic or Latino of any race were 0.22% of the population.

There were 357 households, out of which 35.3% had children under the age of 18 living with them, 61.9% were married couples living together, 8.1% had a female householder with no husband present, and 26.1% were non-families. 21.0% of all households were made up of individuals, and 8.7% had someone living alone who was 65 years of age or older. The average household size was 2.54 and the average family size was 2.94.

In the CDP, the population was spread out, with 24.1% under the age of 18, 9.7% from 18 to 24, 32.7% from 25 to 44, 23.6% from 45 to 64, and 9.9% who were 65 years of age or older. The median age was 36 years. For every 100 females, there were 98.5 males. For every 100 females age 18 and over, there were 94.1 males.

The median income for a household in the CDP was $37,273, and the median income for a family was $40,417. Males had a median income of $35,464 versus $20,385 for females. The per capita income for the CDP was $15,614. About 7.7% of families and 8.5% of the population were below the poverty line, including 12.4% of those under age 18 and 14.6% of those age 65 or over.
