= Presley Thornton =

American planter and politician in Virginia (1721–1769)

- Born: Peter Presley Thornton; 1721; King George County, Colony of Virginia, British America
- Died: December 8, 1769 (aged 47–48); Northumberland House, Northumberland County, Colony of Virginia
- Occupations: Planter, Politician

Presley Thornton (1721 – December 8, 1769) was a planter and public official in Colonial Virginia. Thornton was a member of the House of Burgesses for Northumberland County from 1748 to 1749 and 1752 to 1761. He was the great-grandson of William Thornton, who had arrived in Virginia from England as late as 1646, settling in Gloucester County. Through this paternal line, Presley was a cousin of fellow burgesses Francis Thornton of Spotsylvania, George Thornton of Spotsylvania, William Thornton of King George, William Thornton of Richmond County and William Thornton of Brunswick County. Presley was also a distant cousin of the future presidents, James Madison and Zachary Taylor.

== Life ==
Thornton was born in 1721 in King George County, Virginia, to Anthony Thornton and Winifred Presley, the daughter of Peter Presley. When Peter Presley died, young Presley Thornton was made sole heir of the entirety of the Presley estate, which included some 3,000 acres and a notable house known as "Northumberland House". Though his full name is Peter Presley Thornton, in most historical records he appears as Presley Thornton and was recorded as Presley Thornton in the House of Burgesses.

He was elected to represent Northumberland in the House of Burgesses in 1748–1749 and returned in 1752–1761 and was appointed to the King's Council in 1760. He was voted out of office in 1761 and retired and devoted his remaining years to his plantation. Following his death in 1769, Northumberland House was inherited by Peter Presley Thornton Jr, his eldest son by his first wife, and his second wife (Charlotte) removed to England with her four children. Charlotte's three sons served in the British military, and that branch of the family were staunch loyalists unlike all other branches of the Thornton family. After the premature death of the junior Peter Presley Thornton in 1870, Thornton's second son Presley Thornton inherited Northumberland House and returned from England. The younger Thornton was pardoned and restored to full citizenship in 1783 and retained ownership of Northumberland House until 1800, at which time he sold the entire estate and moved to Genesee Country in New York, where he died in November 1806 in Bath, Steuben County, New York.

== Marriages and children ==
Thornton married twice, both at unknown dates, firstly to Elizabeth whose identity is not precisely known. His second wife was Charlotte Belson, the adopted daughter or ward of Colonel John Tayloe of Mt. Airy in Richmond County, Virginia. Belson was reported to have been English and is likely to have come to the Tayloe through relations of Mrs. Tayloe's first marriage to the Bristol merchant Stephen Lyde. As political tensions increased in the colony, Belson moved her four children back to England, engaging two of her sons in the British Army and one in the British Navy.

Thornton's children from his first marriage remained in Virginia during the war.

Children of Presley Thornton and Elizabeth ? :

- Elizabeth Thornton
- Peter Presley Thornton – died without issue, younger brother inherited his estate
- Winifred Thornton

Children of Presley Thornton and Charlotte Belson:

- Presley Thornton – married Elizabeth Thornton (daughter of Francis Thornton) removed to New York
- Charlotte Belson Thornton
- Gen. Sir Charles Wade Thornton – remained in England
- John Tayloe Thornton
