= Graham's Forge Mill =

- U.S. National Register of Historic Places
- Virginia Landmarks Register
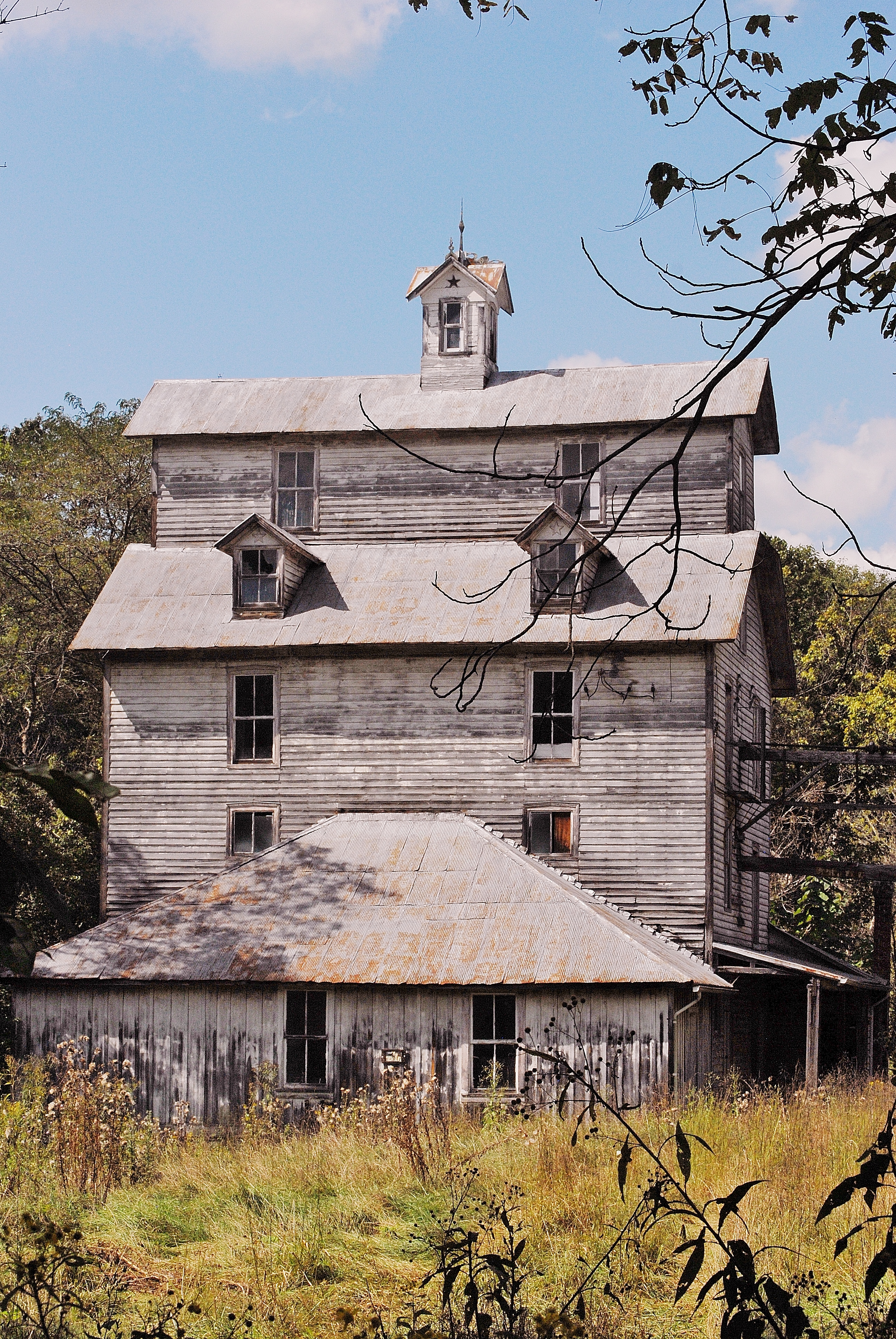

- Location within Virginia Location within the United States
- Location: SR 639, Grahams Forge, Virginia
- Coordinates: 36°56′32″N 80°53′10″W
- Area: 3.9 acres (1.6 ha)
- Built: 1890
- Architectural style: Late Victorian
- NRHP reference No.: 05000481
- VLR No.: 098-0052

Significant dates
- Added to NRHP: May 26, 2005
- Designated VLR: March 16, 2005

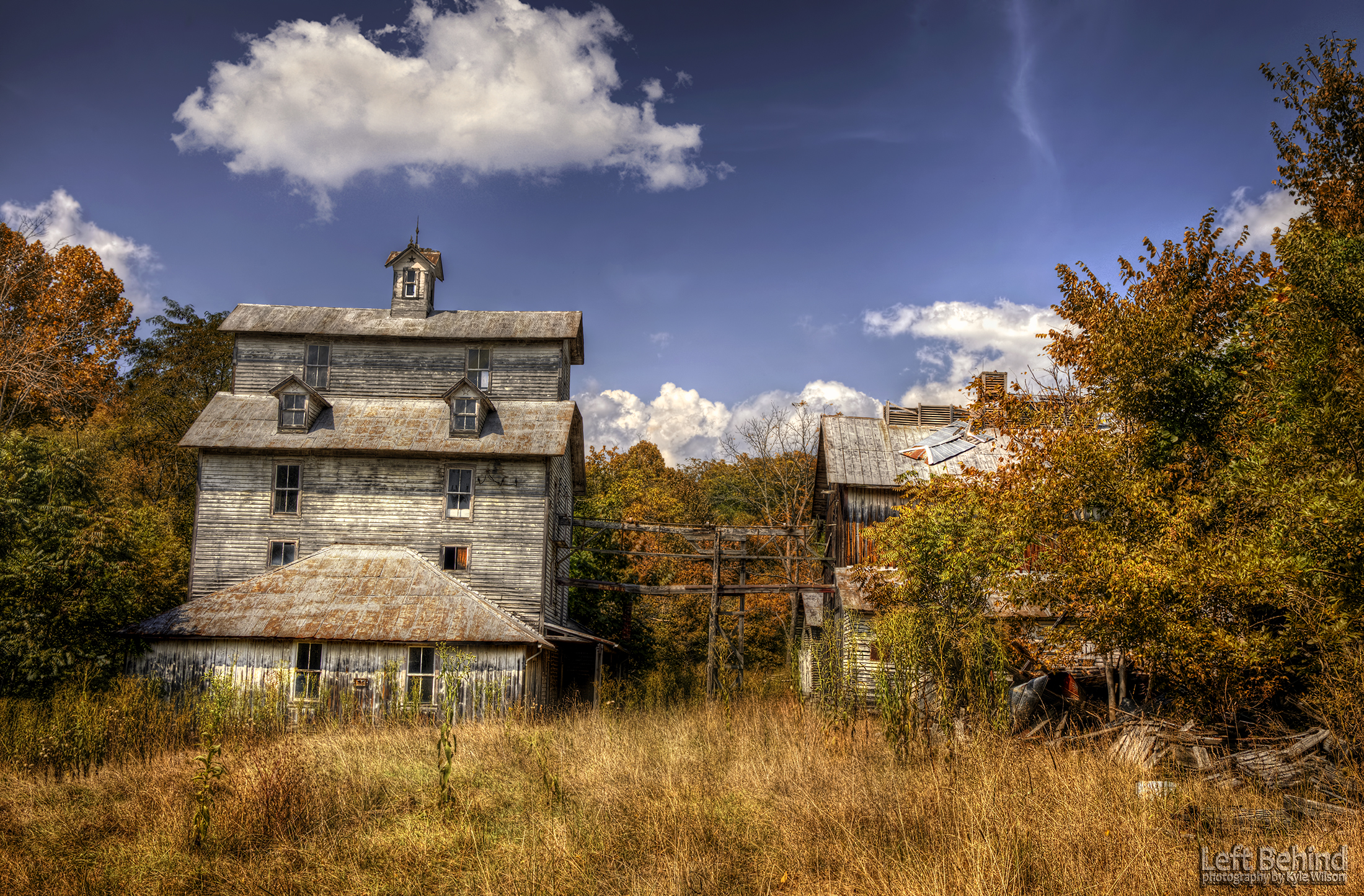
Grahams Forge Mill

Graham's Forge Mill is a historic grist mill located in the community of Grahams Forge, Wythe County, Virginia. The mill was built about 1890, and is a five-story, rectangular, wood-frame building on a limestone foundation. Atop the cross-gable standing seam metal roof is a cupola with a finial, decorative cresting on the ridges, and a late-Victorian-styled lightning rod. Also on the property are the contributing smokehouse with oven / kettle used for hog scalding, corn crib, grain storage facility, oven / kettle remains, and mill dam.

It was listed on the National Register of Historic Places in 2005.
