= Fort Chiswell Site =

Archaeological site in Virginia, United States

- U.S. National Register of Historic Places
- Virginia Landmarks Register
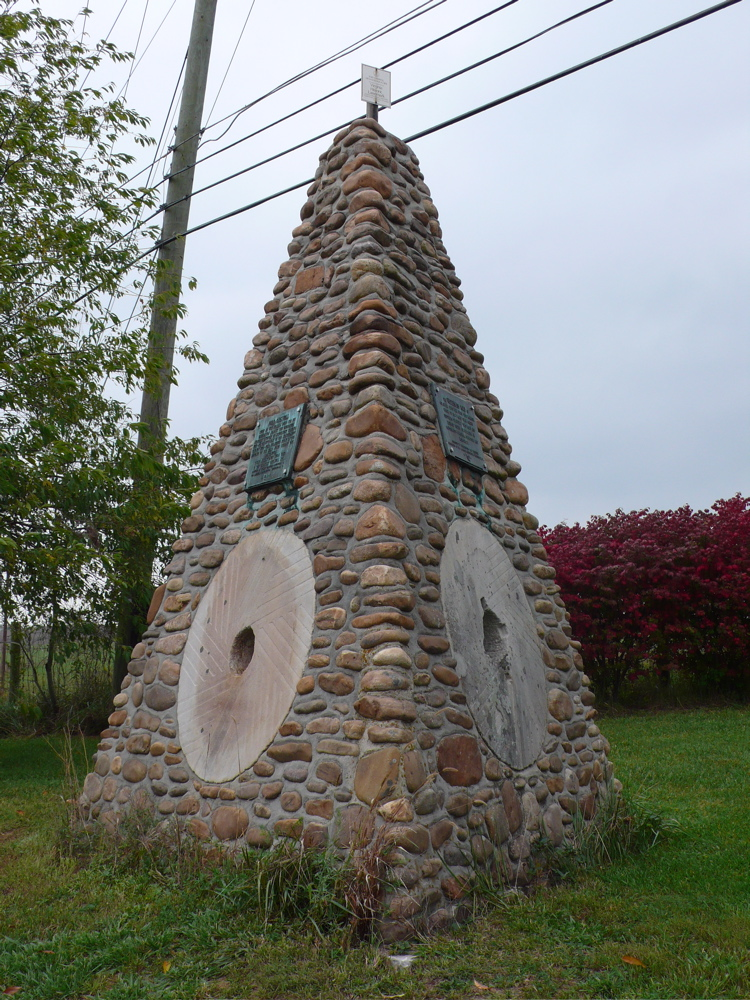
- Fort Chiswell Monument, October 2008
- Nearest city: Fort Chiswell, Virginia
- Area: 94 acres (38 ha)
- Built: 1752
- NRHP reference No.: 78003046
- VLR No.: 098-0026

Significant dates
- Added to NRHP: August 29, 1978
- Designated VLR: December 21, 1976

Fort Chiswell Site is a historic archaeological site located at Fort Chiswell, Wythe County, Virginia. It is the site of a frontier fort built in 1758 as an outpost during the French and Indian War. The fort was situated at the junction of the Great Trading Path and the Richmond Road, near the New River. The fort fell into disrepair in the 18th century as both the county seat and courthouse were moved from Fort Chiswell to the county seat of Wytheville, 12 miles to the west. The remaining foundations of the Fort and its surrounding buildings were completely covered over during the construction of I-77 in Wythe County during the 1970s. There is a pyramid shaped historical marker of sandstone situated approximately 200 yards west-northwest of the fort's original location.

It was listed on the National Register of Historic Places in 1978.
