= Speedwell, Virginia =

- Unincorporated community
- Location within Virginia Location within the United States
- Coordinates: 36°48′49″N 81°10′18″W
- Country: United States
- State: Virginia
- County: Wythe
- Elevation: 2,320 ft (710 m)
- Time zone: UTC−5 (Eastern (EST))
  - Summer (DST): UTC−4 (EDT)
- ZIP code: 24374
- GNIS feature ID: 1502808

Speedwell is an unincorporated community in Wythe County, Virginia, United States. Speedwell Is famous for 'Cave Hill', a cave in the side of the mountain. Speedwell has been known to be called Speedville.

The Zion Evangelical Lutheran Church Cemetery was listed on the National Register of Historic Places in 1979.

== Climate ==
The climate in this area features moderate differences between highs and lows, and there is adequate rainfall year-round. According to the Köppen Climate Classification system, Speedwell has a temperate oceanic climate, abbreviated "Cfb" on climate maps.

== See also ==
- Tazewell M. Starkey#Speedwell Plantation
