= New River Trail State Park =

State park in southwest Virginia, United States

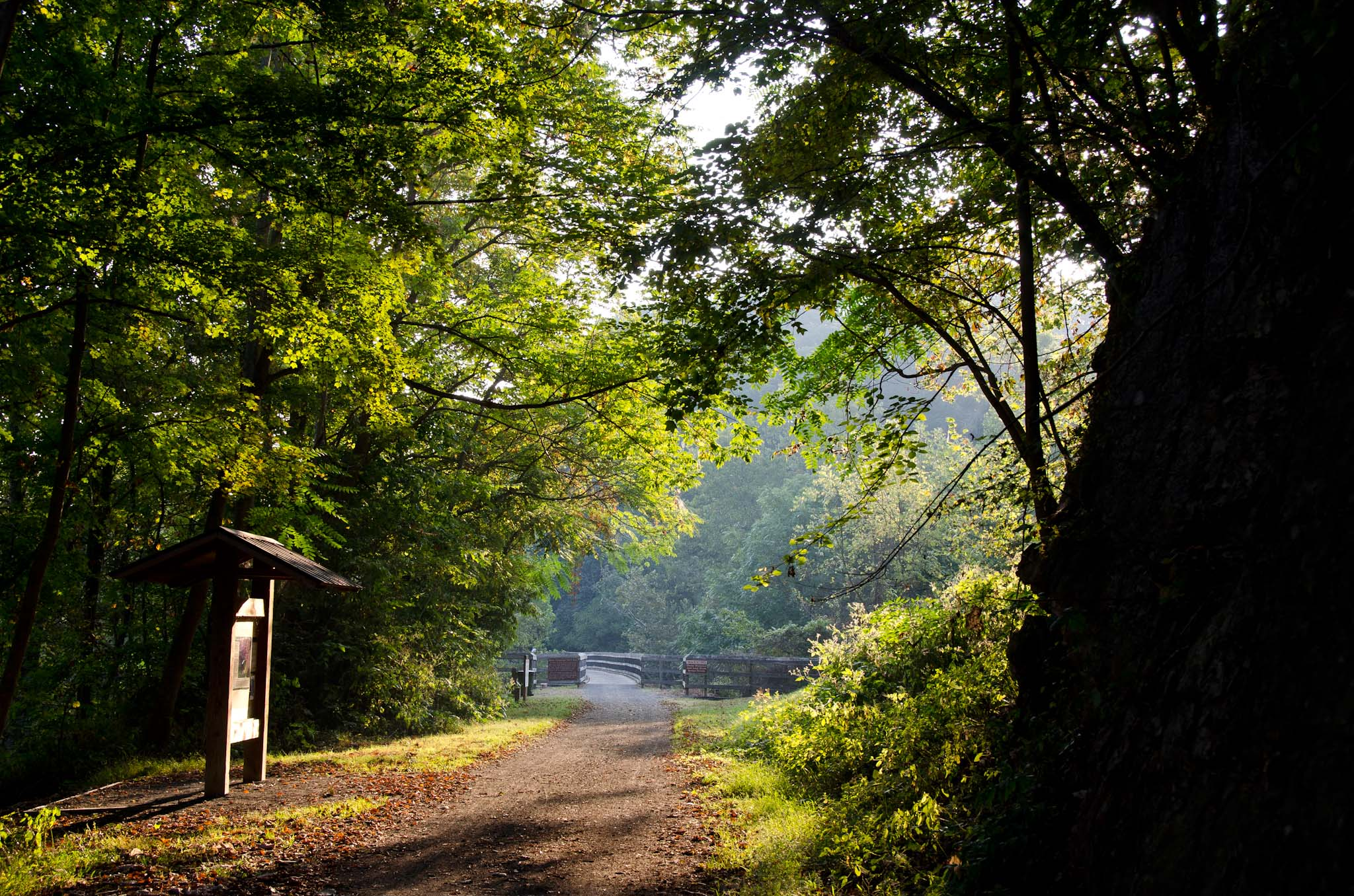
- New River Trail State Park

- Location within Virginia
- Location: Southwest Virginia
- Coordinates: 36°53′5″N 80°51′9″W
- Area: 1,217 acres (493 ha)
- Established: 1987
- Governing body: Virginia Department of Conservation and Recreation

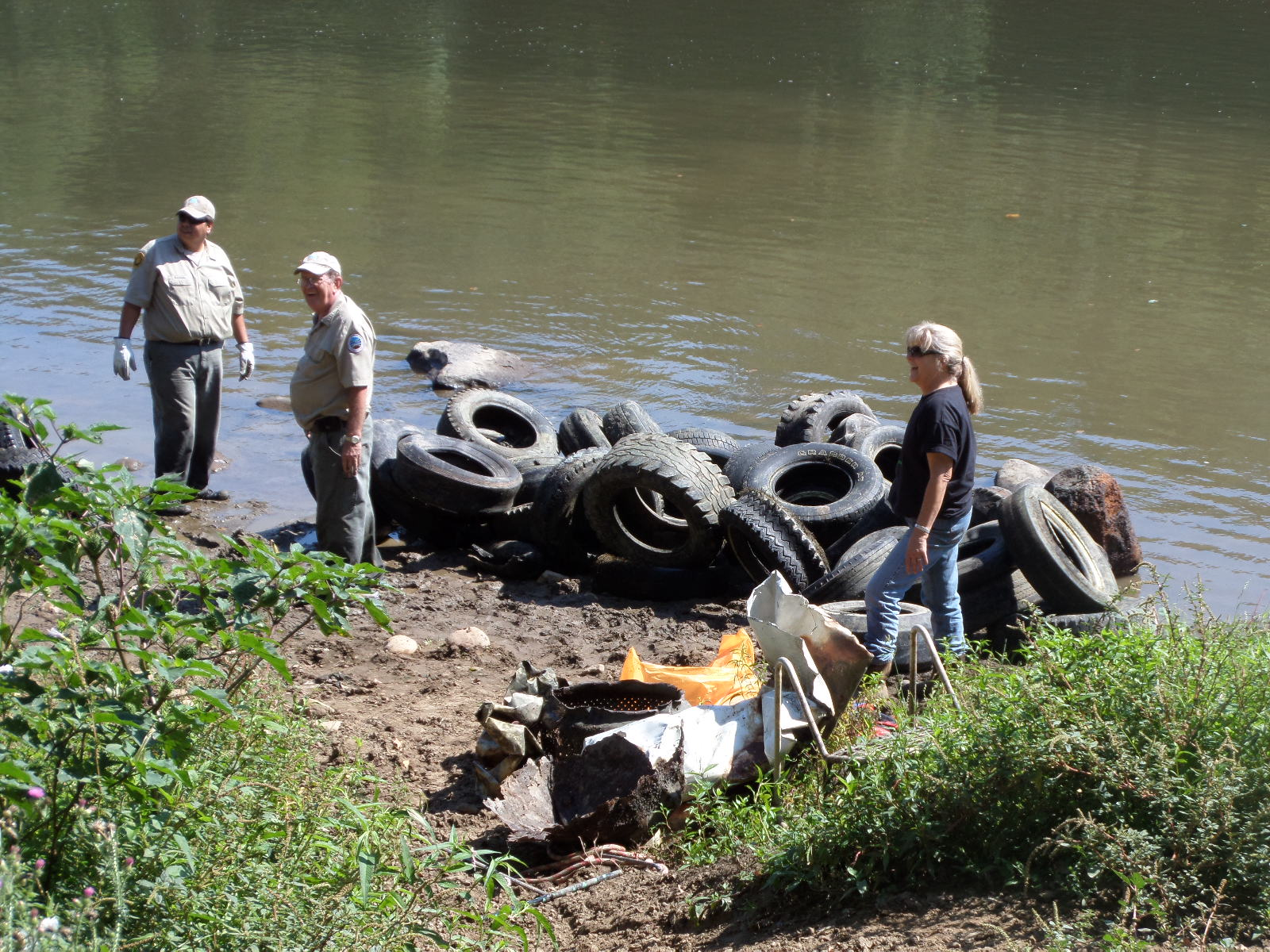
Volunteers worked alongside park staff to pull tires, tarps, and other debris from the New River

New River Trail State Park is a 57.7-mile (92.9 km) rail trail and 1,217-acre (1.902 sq mi) state park located entirely in southwest Virginia, extending from the trail's northeastern terminus in Pulaski to its southern terminus in Galax, with a 5.5-mile (8.9 km) spur from Fries Junction on the main trail to Fries.

Designated a National Recreation Trail, the linear park follows 39 miles (63 km) of the New River, which is one of the five oldest rivers in the world.

Headquartered in Foster Falls, roughly a third of the trail distance from Pulaski, the crushed stone multi-use trail was formally created in 1986, when Norfolk Southern Railway donated its discontinued right-of-way to the state of Virginia. Volunteers began making improvements and the park opened in May 1987 with 4 miles (6.4 km) of trail, opening the entire 57 miles (92 km) for recreational use by the late 1990s.

The trail was designated a Millennium Legacy Trail in 1999, for reflecting "the spirit of the nation's states and territories." The 765-acre (310 ha) linear park adjoins historic sites including the nineteenth-century Jackson Ferry Shot Tower, the Draper Mercantile building, two turn-of-the-century hydroelectric dams, remains of the Ivanhoe Blast Furnace, the Ivanhoe Carbide Plant, the Foster Falls Blast Furnace, and the Foster Falls Orphanage, as well as numerous outdoor recreational areas, including Mount Rogers National Recreation Area, and four Department of Game and Inland Fisheries boat launches.

The trail features two tunnels, 135 feet (41 m) and 193 feet (59 m) long respectively; three major bridges (Hiwassee Bridge at 951 feet (290 m), Ivanhoe Bridge at 670 feet (200 m) and Fries Junction Bridge at 1,089 feet (332 m) in length); and almost 30 smaller bridges and trestles.

== Nearby state parks ==
The following state parks are within 30 miles (48 km) of New River Trail State Park:

- Claytor Lake State Park
- Grayson Highlands State Park
- New River State Park, North Carolina
- Stone Mountain State Park, North Carolina

== See also ==
- Cycling infrastructure
- Fall Line Trail
- Greenbrier River Trail
- High Bridge Trail State Park
- List of Virginia state parks
- Virginia Capital Trail
- Virginia Creeper Trail
- Washington & Old Dominion Trail
