= Austinville, Virginia =

- Census-designated place
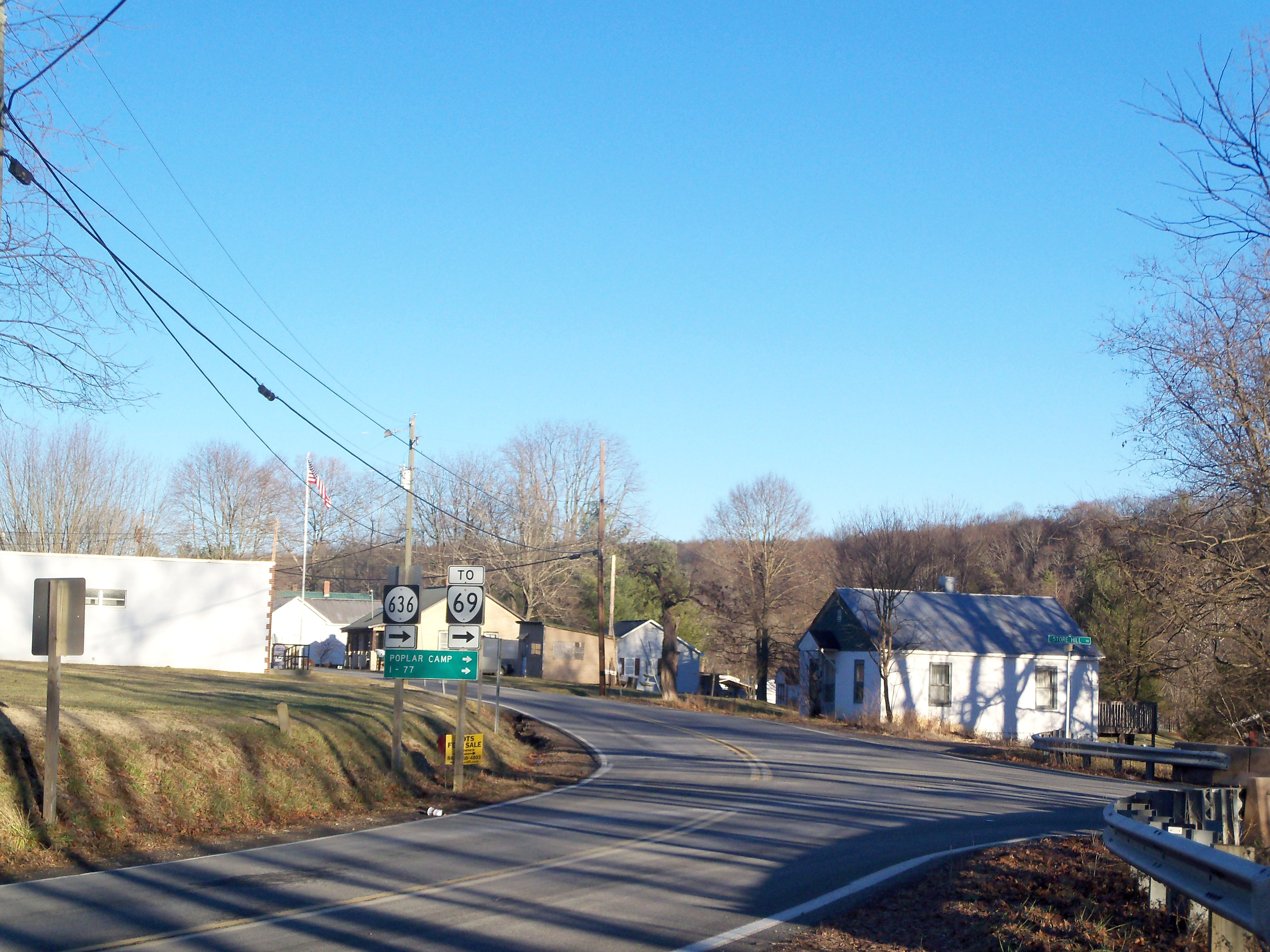
- Interactive map of Austinville, Virginia
- Coordinates: 36.8512342°N 80.9120233°W
- Country: United States
- State: Virginia
- County: Wythe
- Elevation: 650 m (2,130 ft)

Population (2020)
  - Total: 119
- ZIP code: 24312
- Area code: 276

Austinville is an unincorporated community and census-designated place (CDP) on the New River in southern Wythe County, Virginia, United States. It was first listed as a CDP in the 2020 census with a population of 119. New River Trail State Park runs through Austinville, and Shot Tower Historical State Park is located nearby. The town is the birthplace of Stephen F. Austin, for whose family it is named.

The ZIP code (mail delivery region) for Austinville extends south into neighboring Carroll County.

Austinville is built on the location of Lead Mines, the seat of the former Fincastle County.

== Demographics ==
Austinville first appeared as a census designated place in the 2020 U.S. census.
