= Wythe County, Virginia =

County in Virginia, United States

- County
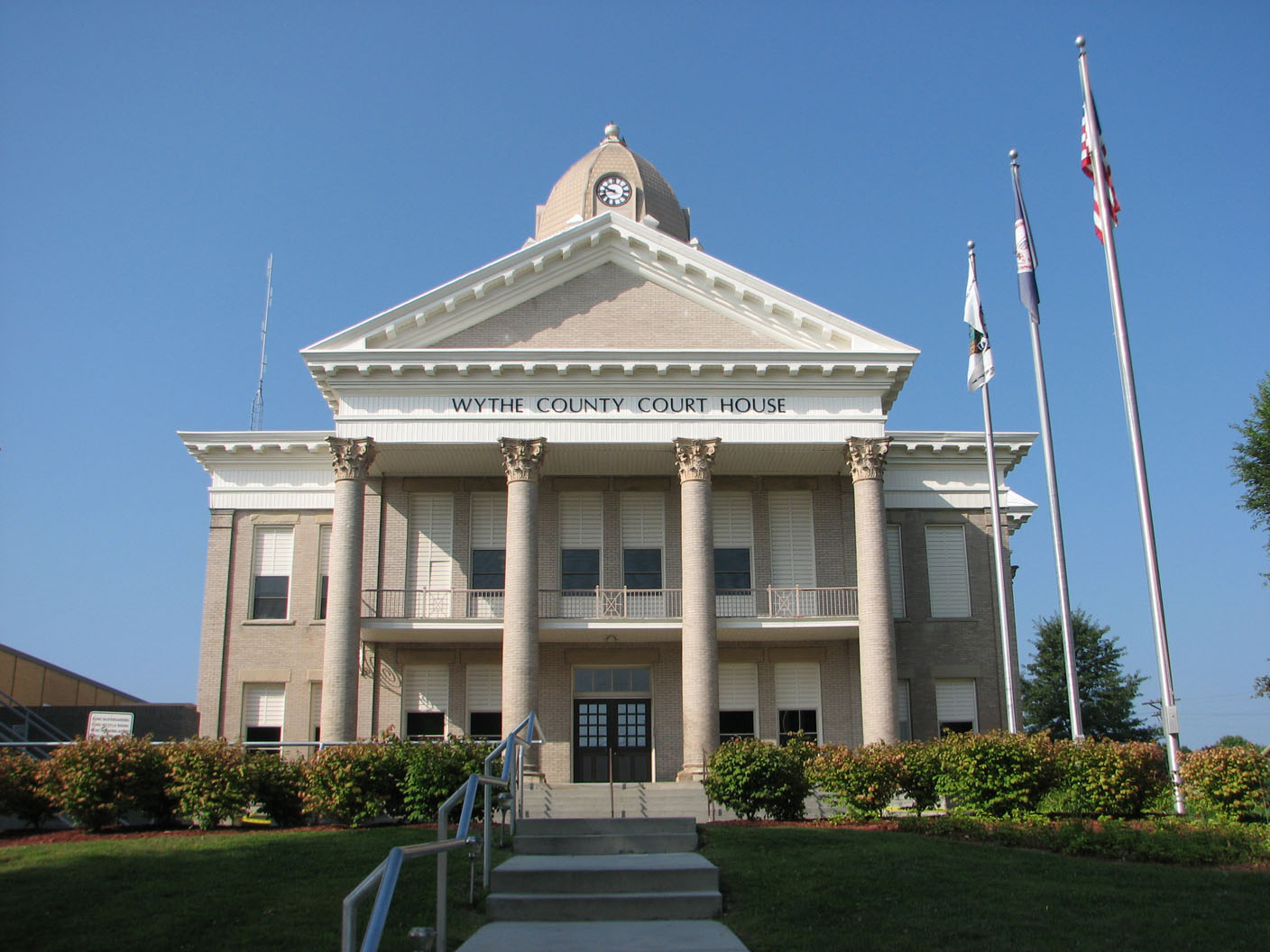
- Wythe County Courthouse in Wytheville

- Seal

- Location within the U.S. state of Virginia
- Coordinates: 36°55′N 81°05′W
- Country: United States
- State: Virginia
- Founded: 1790
- Named for: George Wythe
- Seat: Wytheville
- Largest town: Wytheville

Area
  - Total: 465 sq mi (1,200 km^{2})
  - Land: 462 sq mi (1,200 km^{2})
  - Water: 2.8 sq mi (7.3 km^{2}) 0.6%

Population (2020)
  - Total: 28,290
  - Estimate (2025): 27,983 ▼
  - Density: 61.2/sq mi (23.6/km^{2})
- Time zone: UTC−5 (Eastern)
  - Summer (DST): UTC−4 (EDT)
- Congressional district: 9th
- Website: wytheco.org

Wythe County (/wɪθ/) is a county located in the southwestern part of the U.S. state of Virginia. As of the 2020 United States census, the population was 28,290. Its county seat is Wytheville.

== History ==
Wythe County was formed from Montgomery County in 1790. It was named after George Wythe, the first Virginian signer of the Declaration of Independence. During the Civil War the Battle of Cove Mountain was fought in the county.

Prior to Wythe County's creation, what is now the Wythe County community of Austinville served as the county seat for Fincastle County, an extinct Virginia county whose borders stretched from Roanoke, Virginia, to the Mississippi River – a county roughly the size of half the State of Texas.

Wythe County's Austinville community was founded by Stephen and his brother Moses Austin, father of the famous Stephen F. Austin. In the 1790s the Austins took over the mines that produced lead and zinc; the town was named for the Austin surname, and not for any one particular Austin of the brothers who bore that surname. Lead was mined and shipped throughout the fledgling country; lead shot was also produced. Located near Fosters Falls, Jackson Ferry Shot Tower still stands today as part of Shot Tower State Park. Lead was hoisted to the top of the tower using block and tackle and oxen. The lead was melted in a retort and then poured through a sieve at the top of the tower. The droplets of molten lead would become round during the 150-foot descent. The shot would collect in a kettle of water and slave laborers would enter through a 110-foot access tunnel located near the bank of the New River to retrieve the shot from the kettle. The lead mines closed in 1982 due to new United States Environmental Protection Agency standards and the lack of a market for lead. The mines have since filled with water; the main shaft extended in excess of 1100 feet straight down.

On August 15, 1926, the lynching of Raymond Byrd occurred at the Wythe County jail.

Another notable area within the county is the unincorporated community of Fort Chiswell - named for a French and Indian War era fort. The fort and its surrounding buildings served as the county seat until the incorporated town of Wytheville was established approximately 10 miles to the west. The fort fell into disrepair and its ruins were covered over when the intersection of I-77 and I-81 was constructed in the 1970s. A pyramid marker now stands in the approximate location of the former fort. The community was named for Colonel John Chiswell who helped establish the lead mines (1757) prior to the Austin's purchase.

Wythe County's location, at the confluence of I-81 and I-77 which is, incidentally, a wrong-way concurrency, has led to its growth for industry and tourism. In the 21st century, Gatorade and Pepsi manufacturing facilities have located here, primarily due to the ease of access and central location along the Eastern seaboard. There are a variety of travel-related businesses including several hundred hotel rooms, several truck stops, and restaurants located in the county. Tourism takes a variety of different forms in Wythe County. There are numerous opportunities for those that enjoy outdoor activities including a variety of trails, campgrounds, and parks in the area including the headquarters of New River Trail State Park, Rural Retreat Lake, and Crystal Springs Recreation Area. Its first winery opened in 2006 and a second opened in 2007. A dinner theatre is located in the county seat, Wytheville. Wytheville itself is home to a recently revitalized historic downtown district with restaurants, shops, breweries, and the Millwald Theatre. In 2022, it was announced that the Blue Ridge Bobcats, a professional ice hockey team, would begin play at the Hitachi Energy Arena in Wythe County.

== Geography ==
According to the U.S. Census Bureau, the county has a total area of 465 square miles (1,200 km^{2}), of which, 462 square miles (1,200 km^{2}) of it is land and 2.8 square miles (7.3 km^{2}) (0.6%) is water. The county is intersected by the New River. The land is mostly an elevated plateau, lying between Iron Mountain on the south and Walker's Mountain on the northwest. The soil is generally fertile. Iron ore, lead, bituminous coal, limestone, and gypsum are very abundant, and there are traces of silver found in the lead mines. Wythe County is one of the 423 counties served by the Appalachian Regional Commission, and it is identified as part of "Greater Appalachia" by Colin Woodard in his book American Nations: A History of the Eleven Rival Regional Cultures of North America.

=== Adjacent counties ===
- Bland County - north
- Smyth County - west
- Grayson County - south
- Carroll County - southeast
- Pulaski County - east

=== National protected areas ===
- Jefferson National Forest (part)
- Mount Rogers National Recreation Area (part)

=== Major highways ===
- I-74 (future)
- I-77
- I-81
- US 11
- US 21
- US 52
- SR 69
- SR 90
- SR 94
- SR 100
- SR 121

== Demographics ==
Historical population
Census	Pop.	Note	%±
1800	6,380		—
1810	8,356		31.0%
1820	9,692		16.0%
1830	12,163		25.5%
1840	9,375		−22.9%
1850	12,024		28.3%
1860	12,305		2.3%
1870	11,611		−5.6%
1880	14,318		23.3%
1890	18,019		25.8%
1900	20,437		13.4%
1910	20,372		−0.3%
1920	20,217		−0.8%
1930	20,704		2.4%
1940	22,721		9.7%
1950	23,327		2.7%
1960	21,975		−5.8%
1970	22,139		0.7%
1980	25,522		15.3%
1990	25,466		−0.2%
2000	27,599		8.4%
2010	29,235		5.9%
2020	28,290		−3.2%
2025 (est.)	27,983	▼	−1.1%
U.S. Decennial Census; 1790-1960 1900-1990; 1990-2000 2010 2020

=== Racial and ethnic composition ===
Wythe County, Virginia – Racial and ethnic composition Note: the US Census treats Hispanic/Latino as an ethnic category. This table excludes Latinos from the racial categories and assigns them to a separate category. Hispanics/Latinos may be of any race.
Race / Ethnicity (NH = Non-Hispanic)	Pop 1980	Pop 1990	Pop 2000	Pop 2010	Pop 2020	% 1980	% 1990	% 2000	% 2010	% 2020
White alone (NH)	24,445	24,430	26,332	27,649	26,082	95.78%	95.93%	95.41%	94.57%	92.20%
Black or African American alone (NH)	909	880	777	809	699	3.56%	3.46%	2.82%	2.77%	2.47%
Native American or Alaska Native alone (NH)	11	34	44	39	54	0.04%	0.13%	0.16%	0.13%	0.19%
Asian alone (NH)	44	61	104	124	118	0.17%	0.24%	0.38%	0.42%	0.42%
Native Hawaiian or Pacific Islander alone (NH)	x	x	4	3	2	x	x	0.01%	0.01%	0.01%
Other race alone (NH)	12	1	28	13	66	0.05%	0.00%	0.10%	0.04%	0.23%
Mixed race or Multiracial (NH)	x	x	153	318	914	x	x	0.55%	1.09%	3.23%
Hispanic or Latino (any race)	101	60	157	280	355	0.40%	0.24%	0.57%	0.96%	1.25%
Total	25,522	25,466	27,599	29,235	28,290	100.00%	100.00%	100.00%	100.00%	100.00%

=== 2020 census ===
As of the 2020 census, the county had a population of 28,290. The median age was 46.0 years. 19.8% of residents were under the age of 18 and 22.2% of residents were 65 years of age or older. For every 100 females there were 95.3 males, and for every 100 females age 18 and over there were 92.2 males age 18 and over.

The racial makeup of the county was 92.5% White, 2.5% Black or African American, 0.2% American Indian and Alaska Native, 0.4% Asian, 0.0% Native Hawaiian and Pacific Islander, 0.6% from some other race, and 3.8% from two or more races. Hispanic or Latino residents of any race comprised 1.3% of the population.

25.3% of residents lived in urban areas, while 74.7% lived in rural areas.

There were 12,281 households in the county, of which 24.9% had children under the age of 18 living with them and 28.0% had a female householder with no spouse or partner present. About 31.2% of all households were made up of individuals and 15.4% had someone living alone who was 65 years of age or older.

There were 13,990 housing units, of which 12.2% were vacant. Among occupied housing units, 72.4% were owner-occupied and 27.6% were renter-occupied. The homeowner vacancy rate was 1.8% and the rental vacancy rate was 6.0%.

=== 2000 Census ===
As of the census of 2000, there were 27,599 people, 11,511 households, and 8,103 families residing in the county. The population density was 60 people per square mile (23 people/km^{2}). There were 12,744 housing units at an average density of 28 units per square mile (11 units/km^{2}). The racial makeup of the county was 95.76% White, 2.87% Black or African American, 0.16% Native American, 0.38% Asian, 0.01% Pacific Islander, 0.24% from other races, and 0.58% from two or more races. 0.57% of the population were Hispanic or Latino of any race.

There were 11,511 households, out of which 28.90% had children under the age of 18 living with them, 56.20% were married couples living together, 10.50% had a female householder with no husband present, and 29.60% were non-families. 26.30% of all households were made up of individuals, and 11.70% had someone living alone who was 65 years of age or older. The average household size was 2.36 and the average family size was 2.83.

In the county, the population was spread out, with 21.80% under the age of 18, 7.60% from 18 to 24, 28.90% from 25 to 44, 25.90% from 45 to 64, and 15.80% who were 65 years of age or older. The median age was 39 years. For every 100 females there were 91.40 males. For every 100 females aged 18 and over, there were 88.30 males.

The median income for a household in the county was $32,235, and the median income for a family was $40,188. Males had a median income of $29,053 versus $20,550 for females. The per capita income for the county was $17,639. About 8.50% of families and 11.00% of the population were below the poverty line, including 12.50% of those under age 18 and 13.40% of those age 65 or over.

== Education ==
=== Colleges ===
- Breckbill Bible College, Grahams Forge
- Blueridge College of Evangelism, Wytheville
- Wytheville Community College, Wytheville

=== Public high schools ===
- Fort Chiswell High School, Fort Chiswell
- George Wythe High School, Wytheville
- Rural Retreat High School, Rural Retreat

=== Private schools ===
- The Baptist Academy of Rural Retreat, Rural Retreat
- Granite Christian Academy, Wytheville
- Appalachian Christian Academy, Rural Retreat
- Grace Christian Academy, Max Meadows
- United Christian Academy, Austinville

== Government ==
=== Board of Supervisors ===
The Board of Supervisors:

- District 1 (Blacklick): Bradley D. Martin (R)
- District 2 (West Wytheville District): Rolland R. Cook (R)
- District 3 (East Wytheville District): Sarah P. Crockett (D)
- District 4 (Fort Chiswell District): James "Jamie" D. Smith, Chairman (R)
- District 5 (Lead Mines District): Jesse Burnett (R)
- District 6 (Speedwell District): J.W. "Dickie" Morgan, Vice Chairman (R)
- District 7 (Supervisor At-Large): Stacy A. Terry (R)

=== Constitutional Officers ===
- Clerk of the Circuit Court: Jeremiah "Moe" Musser (R)
- Commissioner of the Revenue: Adam Linkous (R)
- Commonwealth's Attorney: Michael "Mike" D. Jones (R)
- Sheriff: Anthony Cline (R)
- Treasurer: Lori C. Guynn (D)

=== Law enforcement ===
Wythe County Sheriff's Office
- Abbreviation: WCSO

Agency overview
- Formed: 1790
- Employees: 27

Jurisdictional structure
- Constituting instrument: Yes
- General nature: Local civilian police

Operational structure
- Headquarters: Wytheville, Virginia
- Deputys: 27

Website
- Official Website

The Wythe County Sheriff's Office (WCSO) is the primary law enforcement agency in Wythe County, Virginia. Previous sheriffs include Charles Foster and Keith Dunagan, who had served for nearly 40 years before retiring. Since the establishment of the Wythe County Sheriff's Office, 1 deputy has died in the line of duty, in 1994.

=== Politics ===
United States presidential election results for Wythe County, Virginia
Year	Republican		Democratic		Third party(ies)	
Year	No.	%	No.	%	No.	%
1912	633	26.39%	1,110	46.27%	656	27.34%
1916	1,370	50.55%	1,334	49.23%	6	0.22%
1920	2,104	58.74%	1,465	40.90%	13	0.36%
1924	1,996	50.58%	1,899	48.12%	51	1.29%
1928	2,540	62.62%	1,516	37.38%	0	0.00%
1932	1,589	45.61%	1,866	53.56%	29	0.83%
1936	2,781	57.01%	2,089	42.82%	8	0.16%
1940	1,507	46.87%	1,695	52.72%	13	0.40%
1944	1,822	55.43%	1,465	44.57%	0	0.00%
1948	2,077	62.26%	976	29.26%	283	8.48%
1952	3,580	68.24%	1,654	31.53%	12	0.23%
1956	3,484	65.65%	1,766	33.28%	57	1.07%
1960	2,871	57.50%	2,075	41.56%	47	0.94%
1964	2,958	50.45%	2,879	49.10%	26	0.44%
1968	3,638	52.25%	1,765	25.35%	1,560	22.40%
1972	4,553	73.96%	1,431	23.25%	172	2.79%
1976	4,231	51.34%	3,578	43.42%	432	5.24%
1980	4,758	54.28%	3,677	41.95%	331	3.78%
1984	6,773	68.65%	2,996	30.37%	97	0.98%
1988	5,827	63.17%	3,201	34.70%	197	2.14%
1992	5,121	48.81%	3,616	34.46%	1,755	16.73%
1996	4,274	49.99%	3,275	38.31%	1,000	11.70%
2000	6,539	63.95%	3,462	33.86%	224	2.19%
2004	7,911	68.47%	3,581	30.99%	62	0.54%
2008	8,207	65.70%	4,107	32.88%	177	1.42%
2012	8,324	67.36%	3,783	30.61%	251	2.03%
2016	10,046	75.29%	2,770	20.76%	527	3.95%
2020	11,733	77.85%	3,143	20.85%	196	1.30%
2024	12,267	79.27%	3,075	19.87%	133	0.86%

Wythe County is a strongly Republican-leaning locality in Virginia's 9th Congressional District. In the 2024 presidential election, Republican Donald Trump received 79.27% of the county's vote compared to 19.87% for Democrat Kamala Harris. This partisan lean is consistent with broader voting patterns across rural southwestern Virginia. At the federal level, the county is represented in the U.S. House of Representatives by Morgan Griffith (R) and in the U.S. Senate by Senators Mark Warner (D) and Tim Kaine (D). At the state level, the county is represented in the Virginia House of Delegates by the 46th district, with Delegate Mitchell Cornett (R), and in the Senate of Virginia by the 5th and 7th districts, represented by Senators Travis Hackworth (R) and Bill Stanley (R), respectively. Both major political parties maintain an organized presence in the county through the Wythe County Republican Party and the Wythe County Democratic Party.

== Communities ==
=== Towns ===
- Rural Retreat
- Wytheville

=== Census-designated places ===
- Austinville
- Fort Chiswell
- Ivanhoe
- Max Meadows

=== Other unincorporated communities ===
- Austinville
- Barren Springs
- Cripple Creek
- Crockett
- Speedwell

== See also ==
- National Register of Historic Places listings in Wythe County, Virginia
