= U.S. Route 52 in Virginia =

Segment of American highway

U.S. Route 52
- US 52 highlighted in red

Route information
- Maintained by VDOT
- Length: 85 mi (137 km)
- Existed: mid-1930s–present
- Tourist routes: Virginia Byway

Major junctions
- South end: US 52 near Mount Airy, NC
- US 58 in Hillsville; US 221 in Hillsville; I-77 / I-81 / US 11 in Fort Chiswell; US 21 in Wytheville
- North end: I-77 / US 52 near Bluefield, WV

Location
- Country: United States
- State: Virginia
- Counties: Carroll, Wythe, Bland

Highway system
- United States Numbered Highway System; List; Special; Divided; Virginia Routes; Interstate; US; Primary; Secondary; Byways; History; HOT lanes
← SR 51	→ SR 53

U.S. Route 52 (US 52) in Virginia runs north–south through the southwestern part of the state along the Interstate 77 (I-77) corridor. Though an even-numbered U.S. route, it is signed north–south in Virginia (standard convention being to label even-numbered U.S. routes with east–west designations). In some other states along its route, it is signed east–west. The Virginia segment is signed such that US 52 north corresponds to the general westward direction of the highway, and vice versa.

== Route description ==
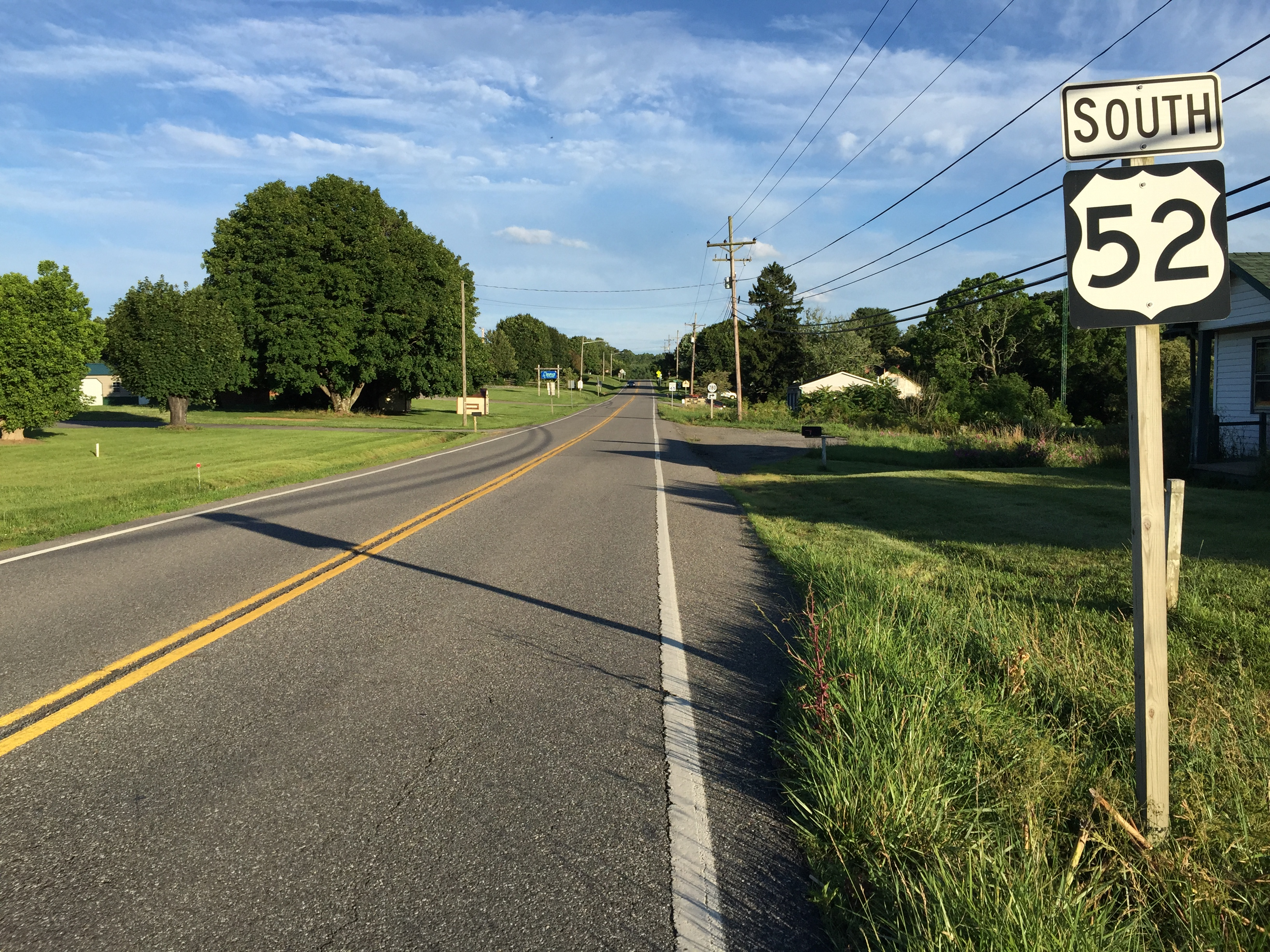
View south along US 52 in Hillsville

US 52 parallels I-77 through the state. It enters Virginia from North Carolina in the town of Cana, Virginia as a two-lane road known as Fancy Gap Highway. In the town of Fancy Gap there is an interchange with the Blue Ridge Parkway, and at the center of town an intersection with SR 755 (Chances Creek Road) provides access to I-77. In Hillsville the route enters town as South Main Street and has an interchange with US 58 at the south edge of town, and in the center of town, it meets US 221 (Stuart Drive) at an intersection, where South Main Street becomes North Main Street, before leaving north out of town along Poplar Camp Road. Gradually climbing through the rolling foothills of the Appalachian Mountains, an intersection with SR 69 provides another access point for I-77, before it crosses over the New River and passes under, but does not interchange with, I-77.

In Fort Chiswell, US 52 meets SR 94 at the center of town before merging with I-77 North/I-81 South/US 11 South. The four routes continue along a freeway together to the city of Wytheville, Virginia, where US 11 leaves along Lee Highway/East Main Street, then I-77 leaves northward along its own freeway, and finally US 52 leaves the freeway at North 4th Street. Leaving Wytheville along Stoney Fork Road, US 52 begins its steep climb across the peak of the Blue Ridge Mountains, passing Big Walker Lookout tower at a hairpin turn just at the ridge of the mountains. Descending via a long series of short switchbacks down the other side of the mountain ridge, there is an interchange with I-77 in the community of Bland. From here northwards, the road is known as Scenic Highway, and it again crosses another ridge of mountains, steeply climbing to meet the Appalachian Trail south of the community of Bastian. Past Bastian, SR 666 provides access to I-77 yet again, and US 52 passes through the small community of Hicksville before a complex interchange with I-77 and SR 606 at Wolf Creek. US 52 closely hugs I-77 as the two routes follow the narrow Wolf Creek valley, as US 52 serves as a frontage road to the southbound lanes of I-77. At Rocky Gap there is a brief concurrency with SR 61 and an interchange with I-77. US 52 merges with I-77 just south of the East River Mountain Tunnel entrance. The two routes pass into West Virginia through the tunnel.

== History ==
The piece of US 52 south of Fort Chiswell was part of the state highway system defined in 1918. It was initially designated State Route 12-Z, at least south of Hillsville, but by 1924 it was State Route 15. In 1926, the U.S. Route 121 designation was applied to the whole length of SR 15, from North Carolina to Fort Chiswell, but it did not turn west on U.S. Route 11 at Fort Chiswell to connect to U.S. Route 21.

An extension of SR 15 from Fort Chiswell north to Max Meadows was added to the state highway system in 1931. In the 1933 renumbering, SR 15 was dropped from the US 121 concurrency, while the short extension to Max Meadows became State Route 121.

US 121 was absorbed by an extension of US 52 by 1935. US 52 was extended through West Virginia and along US 21 to Wytheville and US 11 to Fort Chiswell, where it replaced US 121 into North Carolina.

== Major intersections ==
County	Location	mi	km	Destinations	Notes
Carroll				US 52 south – Mt. Airy, Winston-Salem	Continuation into North Carolina
Carroll	Fancy Gap			Blue Ridge Parkway	Interchange
Carroll		9.42	15.16	SR 148 west (Chances Creek Road) to I-77 / SR 775 – Wytheville, Charlotte	
Carroll	Hillsville			US 58	Interchange
Carroll	Hillsville	16.43	26.44	US 58 Bus. / US 221 (Stuart Drive) to SR 100 / I-77 – Galax, Floyd	
Wythe	Poplar Camp			SR 69 west (Lead Mine Road) to I-77 – Austinville, Hillsville, Charlotte	
Wythe	Farmers Store			SR 94 south (Ivanhoe Road) – Ivanhoe, Fries, Big Survey Wildlife Management Area	
Wythe	Fort Chiswell	34.67	55.80	I-77 south / I-81 north / US 11 north / SR 121 north (Max Meadows Road) – Max Meadows, Charlotte, NC, Roanoke	Southern end of I-77/I-81/US 11 concurrency
Wythe	see I-81				
Wythe	Wytheville	43.56	70.10	I-81 south / US 21 south (North 4th Street) – Bristol, Wytheville, Wytheville Community College	Northern end of I-81 concurrency
Wythe	Favonia			SR 680 (Black Lick Road) – Rural Retreat	Former SR 90 south
Bland		59.62	95.95	SR 42 west (West Blue Grass Trail) – Broadford, Saltville	Southern end of SR 42 concurrency
Bland		63.59	102.34	I-77 – Bluefield, Wytheville	I-77 exit 52
Bland	Bland			SR 98 south (Main Street) / SR 1007 (Jefferson Street) – Bland CH	
Bland	Bland	64.50	103.80	SR 42 east (East Blue Grass Trail) – Poplar Hill	Northern end of SR 42 concurrency
Bland		77.27	124.35	SR 61 west (Clear Fork Creek Road) – Tazewell	Southern end of SR 61 concurrency
Bland		77.33	124.45	I-77 – Bluefield, Wytheville	I-77 exit 64
Bland	Rocky Gap	77.73	125.09	SR 61 east (Wolf Creek Highway) – Narrows	Northern end of SR 61 concurrency
Bland		79.92	128.62	I-77 south / SR 598 north – Bluefield, Wytheville	Southern end of I-77 concurrency
East River Mountain		80.62	129.75	East River Mountain Tunnel	
East River Mountain		80.62	129.75	I-77 north / US 52 north – Beckley	Continuation into West Virginia state line
1.000 mi = 1.609 km; 1.000 km = 0.621 mi: Concurrency terminus

U.S. Route 52
Previous state: West Virginia	Virginia	Next state: North Carolina

< SR 14	Two‑digit State Routes; 1923-1933	SR 16 >
