= Interstate 77 in Virginia =

Section of Interstate Highway in Virginia, United States

Interstate 77
- I-77 highlighted in red

Route information
- Maintained by VDOT
- Length: 66.27 mi (106.65 km)
- Existed: 1972–present
- NHS: Entire route

Major junctions
- South end: I-74 / I-77 at the North Carolina state line near Lambsburg
- US 58 / US 221 near Hillsville; I-81 / US 11 near Wytheville; US 52 various times between Wytheville and Rocky Gap
- North end: I-77 / US 52 at the West Virginia state line near Bluefield, WV

Location
- Country: United States
- State: Virginia
- Counties: Carroll, Wythe, Bland

Highway system
- Interstate Highway System; Main; Auxiliary; Suffixed; Business; Future; Virginia Routes; Interstate; US; Primary; Secondary; Byways; History; HOT lanes
← SR 76	→ SR 78

Interstate 77 (I-77) in the US state of Virginia is a 67-mile (108 km) north–south Interstate Highway serving Hillsville, Wytheville, and Bland. Running parallel to US Route 52 (US 52), I-77 passes through the Big Walker Mountain Tunnel and East River Mountain Tunnel, the latter on the West Virginia state line and one of only two land vehicular tunnels to cross a state line.

== Route description ==
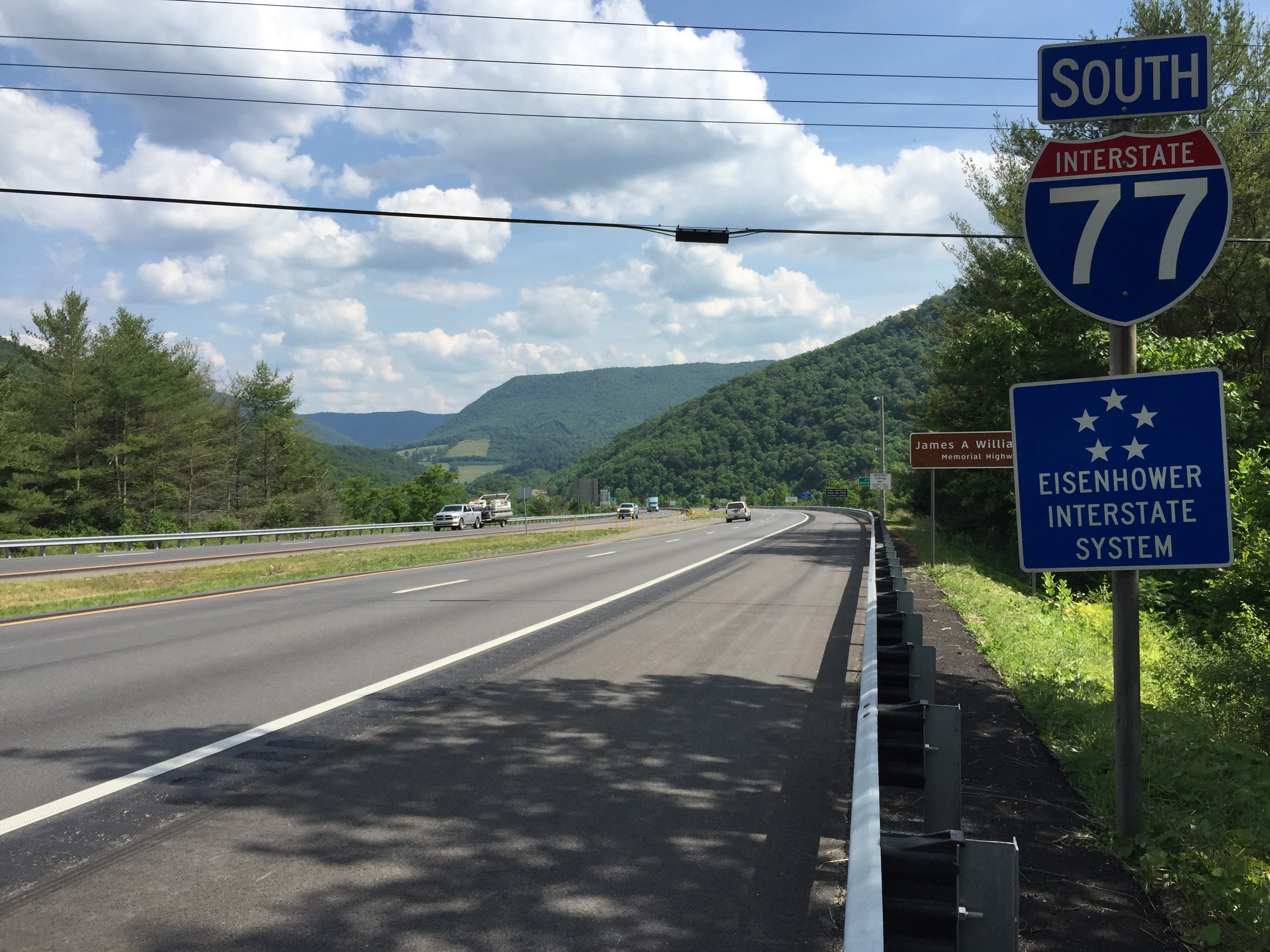
View south along I-77 just south of the East River Mountain Tunnel in Bland County

I-77 enters Virginia near Mount Airy, North Carolina, while the highway continues south into North Carolina concurrently with a segment of the unfinished I-74. The first exit is a folded diamond interchange with State Route 620 (SR 620). The route continues northeast toward Fancy Gap and passes under the Blue Ridge Parkway, with access to it and the town provided by a diamond interchange with SR 775, which has a connection to US 52.

Continuing northwest, the expressway reaches another diamond interchange with US 58/US 221 (Carrollton Pike). The route has another interchange with SR 620 before folding onto I-81.

The route begins a wrong-way concurrency with I-81 and US 11, with the northbound direction cosigned with southbound I-81 and US 11. US 52 joins this concurrency in an interchange. Continuing west, US 11 splits south to Wytheville's downtown and I-81 eventually splits west to head toward Bristol. From here, US 52 resumes its parallel of the expressway and the highway intersects SR 61 near Rocky Gap. Near Bland, the interstate enters the Big Walker Mountain Tunnel, and north of Bland, US 52 merges onto the freeway on the approach to the East River Mountain Tunnel, and the tunnel crosses into West Virginia, where the route continues.

== History ==
I-77 was first opened in 1972 between I-81 in Wytheville and US 52 in Bland, which also included the Big Walker Mountain Tunnel. The Interstate was extended from Bland to the West Virginia border in 1974–1975; this extension included the East River Mountain Tunnel. In July 1977, I-77 was built between the North Carolina border and Fancy Gap, and, in December, it was extended from Fancy Gap to Poplar Camp. In 1978, I-77 was built between Poplar Camp and I-81. The Interstate existed in two separate segments until 1987, when the I-81/I-77 overlap between Wytheville and Fort Chiswell was built.

I-77 in Fancy Gap has been the site of many fatal accidents, often due to fog and wind in the mountains. In November 2010, two people died as a result of a 75-vehicle pileup. On March 31, 2013, 17 crashes along I-77 led to a 95-vehicle pileup and resulted in three deaths. In September 2013, a pileup resulted in one death.

== Exit list ==
County	Location	mi	km	Exit	Destinations	Notes
Carroll		0.00	0.00		I-77 south / I-74 east – Charlotte	North Carolina state line
Carroll		0.94	1.51	1	SR 620	
Carroll		8.57	13.79	8	SR 148 / SR 775 to US 52 – Fancy Gap	To Blue Ridge Parkway
Carroll		14.85	23.90	14	US 58 / US 221 – Hillsville, Galax	
Carroll		19.03	30.63	19	SR 620	
Carroll	Poplar Camp	24.06	38.72	24	SR 69 – Poplar Camp	
Wythe		32.14	51.72	32	I-81 north / US 11 north – Roanoke	South end of I-81 / US 11 wrong-way concurrency; I-77 south follows exit 81
Wythe	Interstate 77 overlaps with I-81. (exit 73 to 80)					
Wythe	Wytheville	39.18	63.05	40	I-81 south / US 52 north to US 21 south – Bristol	North end of I-81 wrong-way concurrency; north end of US 52 overlap; I-77 north follows exit 72
Wythe	Wytheville	40.28	64.82	41	SR 610 (Peppers Ferry Road) – Wytheville, Max Meadows	
Bland		45.77	73.66	47	SR 717	
Wythe	No major junctions					
Big Walker Mountain		48.81	78.55	Big Walker Mountain Tunnel		
Bland	Bland	51.22	82.43	52	US 52 / SR 42 – Bland	
Bland		57.33	92.26	58	US 52 (via SR 666) – Bastian	
Bland	South Gap	61.27	98.60	62	SR 606 – South Gap	
Bland	Rocky Gap	63.24	101.77	64	US 52 / SR 61 – Rocky Gap	
Bland		65.57	105.52	66	US 52 south / SR 598	South end of US 52 overlap
Bland		66.27	106.65		I-77 north / US 52 north – Bluefield, Charleston	West Virginia state line (East River Mountain Tunnel through East River Mountain)
1.000 mi = 1.609 km; 1.000 km = 0.621 mi: Concurrency terminus

Interstate 74
Previous state: West Virginia	Virginia	Next state: North Carolina

Interstate 77
Previous state: North Carolina	Virginia	Next state: West Virginia
