= Big Walker Mountain Tunnel =

Vehicular tunnel in Bland County, Virginia, United States

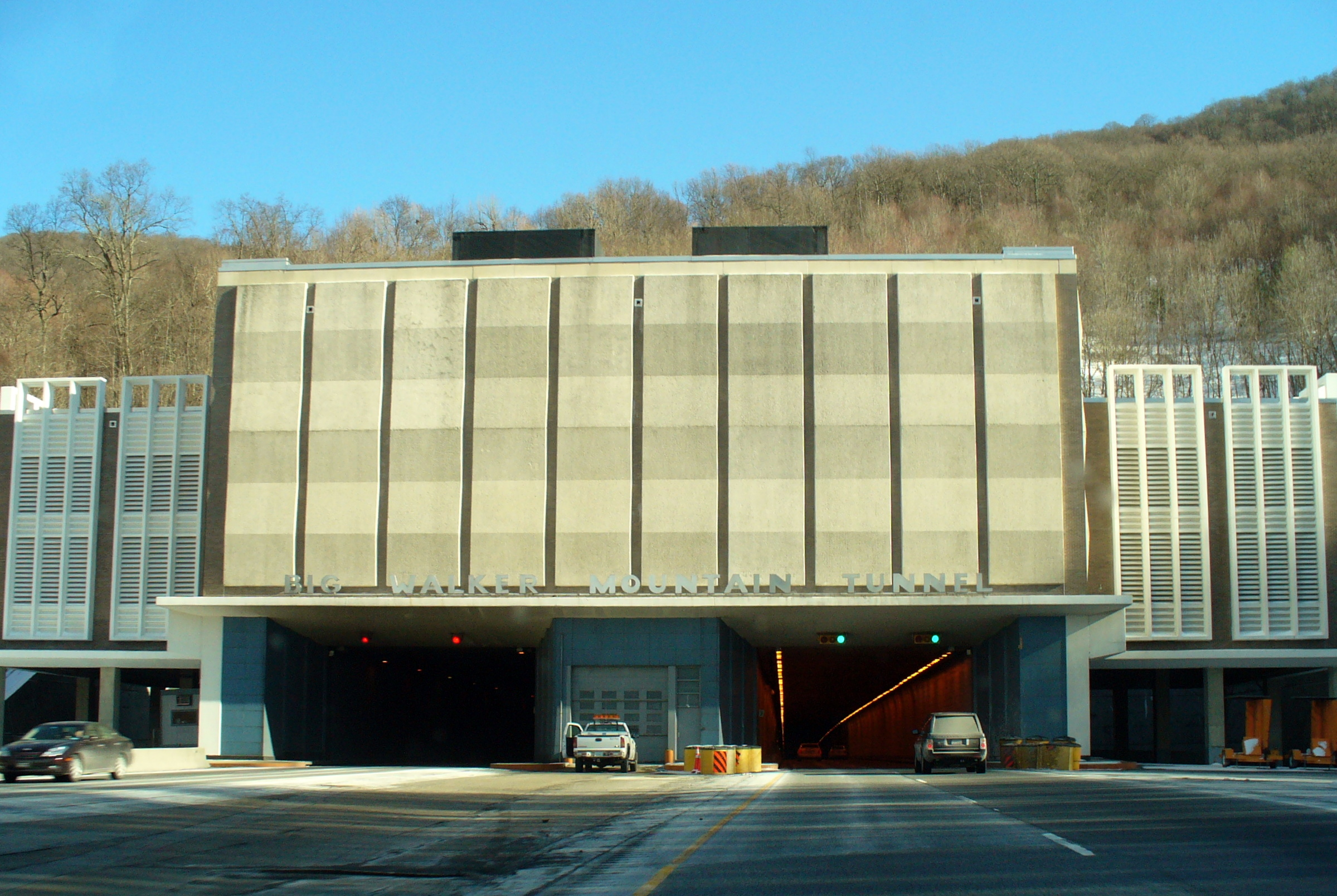
- Detailed shot of northbound entrance
- Interactive map of Big Walker Mountain Tunnel

Overview
- Official name: Big Walker Mountain Tunnel
- Location: Bland County, Virginia, USA
- Coordinates: 37°2′19″N 81°7′51″W
- Route: I-77

Operation
- Opened: 1972
- Toll: None

Technical
- Length: 4,229 ft (1,289 m)
- No. of lanes: 4

The Big Walker Mountain Tunnel is a vehicular tunnel in the Appalachian Mountains of Southwest Virginia that carries Interstate 77 through and under Big Walker Mountain. It is located a few miles south of the town of Bland in Bland County and a segment of the Appalachian Trail, and about 20 miles (32 km) south of its longer cousin, the East River Mountain Tunnel.

== History ==
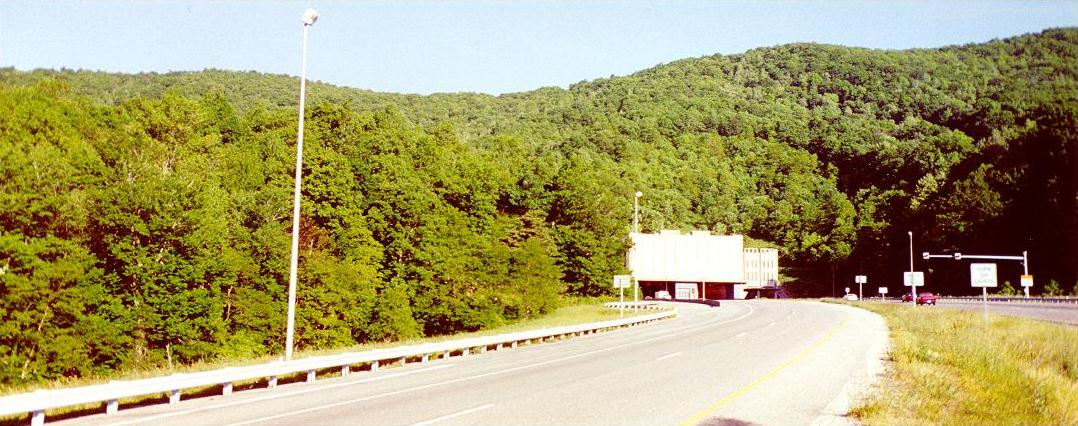
Northbound at Big Walker Mountain Tunnel

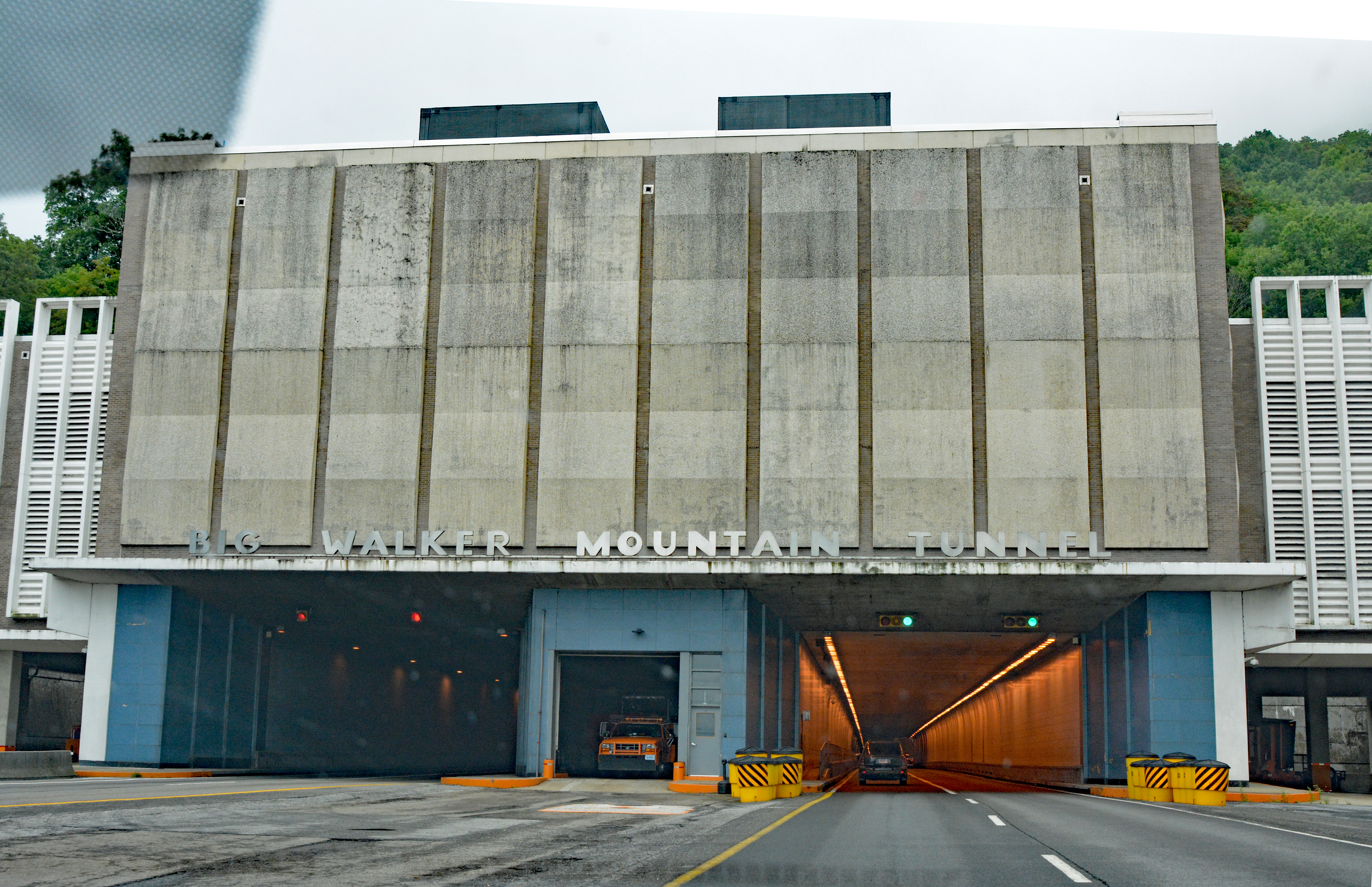
Southbound

The 4,229-foot (1,289 m) tunnel was first opened in 1972 after five years of construction labor. It carried a price tag of $50 million (equivalent to $284 million in 2024), which at the time was the most expensive single project undertaken on Virginia's Interstate system. The opening of the tunnel reduced the travel time from Wytheville to Bland County by 30 minutes.

Preliminary engineering studies for the project were made by Brokenborough & Watkins, consulting engineers of Richmond, Virginia, and the final design of the roadway and tunnel was by Singstad & Kehart, consulting engineers of New York City.

The north tunnel approach and surrounding area can be viewed from the Big Walker Lookout, a 100-foot (30 m) observation tower built on Big Walker Mountain about five miles (8.0 km) west of the tunnel.
