= Smyth-Bland Regional Library =

The Smyth-Bland Regional Library (SBRL) is a library system that serves Smyth and Bland counties in Virginia, USA. The library system is within Region 1 of the Virginia Library Association (VLA).

== Service Area ==
According to the FY 2014 Institute of Museum and Library Services Data Catalog, the Library System has a service area population of 38,852 with one central library and three branch libraries.

== Branches ==
- Bland County Library (Bland)
- Chilhowie Public Library (Chilhowie)
- Saltville Public Library (Saltville)
- Smyth-Bland Regional Library (Marion)
