= West Virginia Route 598 =

State highway in West Virginia, United States

West Virginia Route 598

Route information
- Maintained by WVDOH
- Length: 2.91 mi (4.68 km)

Major junctions
- South end: SR 598 near Bluefield
- US 460 in Bluefield
- North end: US 52 in Bluefield

Location
- Country: United States
- State: West Virginia
- Counties: Mercer

Highway system
- West Virginia State Highway System; Interstate; US; State
← WV 527	→ WV 601

West Virginia Route 598 is a state highway located entirely within Bluefield, West Virginia. The southern terminus of the route is at the Virginia state line (and southern city limits of Bluefield), where WV 598 continues southward as Virginia State Route 598. The northern terminus of the route is at U.S. Route 52 in Bluefield.

WV 598 is a former alignment of US 21 and US 52, the latter of which now runs through the East River Mountain Tunnel with I-77.

== Route description ==
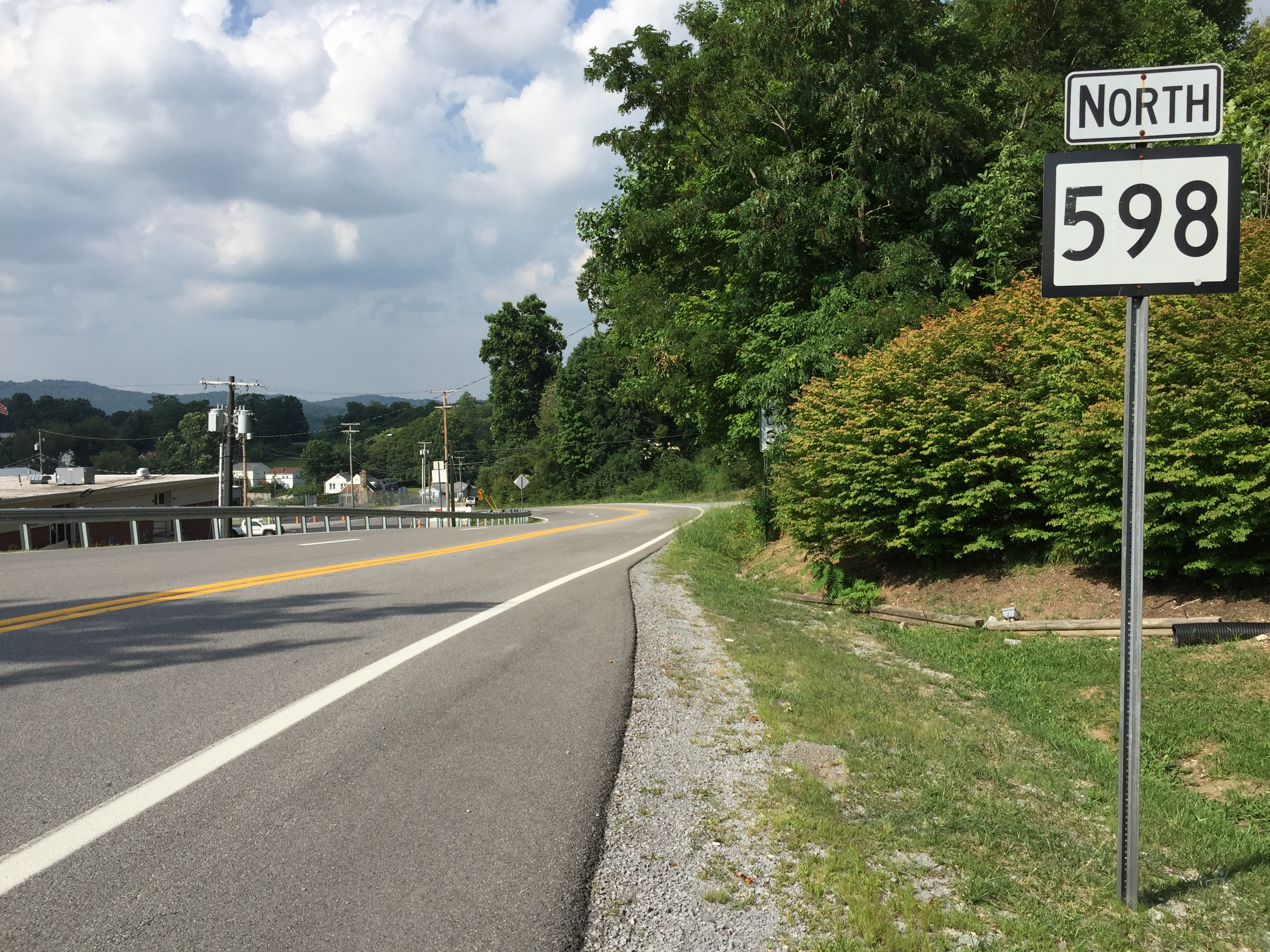
View north along WV 598 at US 460 in Bluefield

From its southern terminus at SR 598, WV 598 runs to the south-southwest for roughly two miles before intersecting U.S. Route 460. The two routes form a concurrency to the west for a quarter of a mile, where WV 598 turns north onto Cherry Drive. A short distance to the north, as Washington Street, WV 598 reaches the intersection of Washington Street and Cumberland Road. WV 598 turns east onto Cumberland Road for a quarter of a mile to an intersection with US 52.

== Major intersections ==
The entire route is in Bluefield, Mercer County.

mi	km	Destinations	Notes
		SR 598 south (East River Mountain Road) – Rocky Gap, Bland, Wytheville	Virginia state line (East River Mountain)
		US 460 west – Tazewell, VA	Southern end of US 460 concurrency
		US 460 east to US 52 south – Princeton	Northern end of US 460 concurrency
		US 52 – Downtown Bluefield, Welch	Northern terminus of WV 598
1.000 mi = 1.609 km; 1.000 km = 0.621 mi: Concurrency terminus
