= Grapefield, Virginia =

Unincorporated community in Virginia, United States

- Unincorporated community
- Location within Virginia Location within the United States
- Coordinates: 37°08′58″N 81°14′31″W
- Country: United States
- State: Virginia
- County: Bland
- Elevation: 2,323 ft (708 m)
- Time zone: UTC-5 (Eastern (EST))
  - Summer (DST): UTC-4 (EDT)
- Area code: 276
- GNIS feature ID: 1493014

Grapefield is an unincorporated community in Bland County, Virginia, United States. The community is located on Virginia State Route 614, 7.6 miles (12.2 km) west-northwest of Bland.
