= Hicksville =

Hicksville may refer to:

== Places ==
- Hicksville, Arkansas
- Hicksville, Kentucky, in Graves County
- Hicksville, New York
  - Hicksville station, Long Island Rail Road station in Hicksville, New York
- Hicksville, Ohio
- Hicksville, Virginia
- "Hicksville", early proposed name for the city of Hastings, New Zealand, which was built on land owned by Francis Hicks

== Other ==
- Hicksville (graphic novel), by Dylan Horrocks
- Hicksville (album), by the band Celtic Cross

== See also ==
- "Hickville", a placeholder name for a small, rural community perceived to be populated by hicks or a theoretical remote, small settlement.
