= East River Mountain Tunnel =

Road tunnel between Virginia and West Virginia

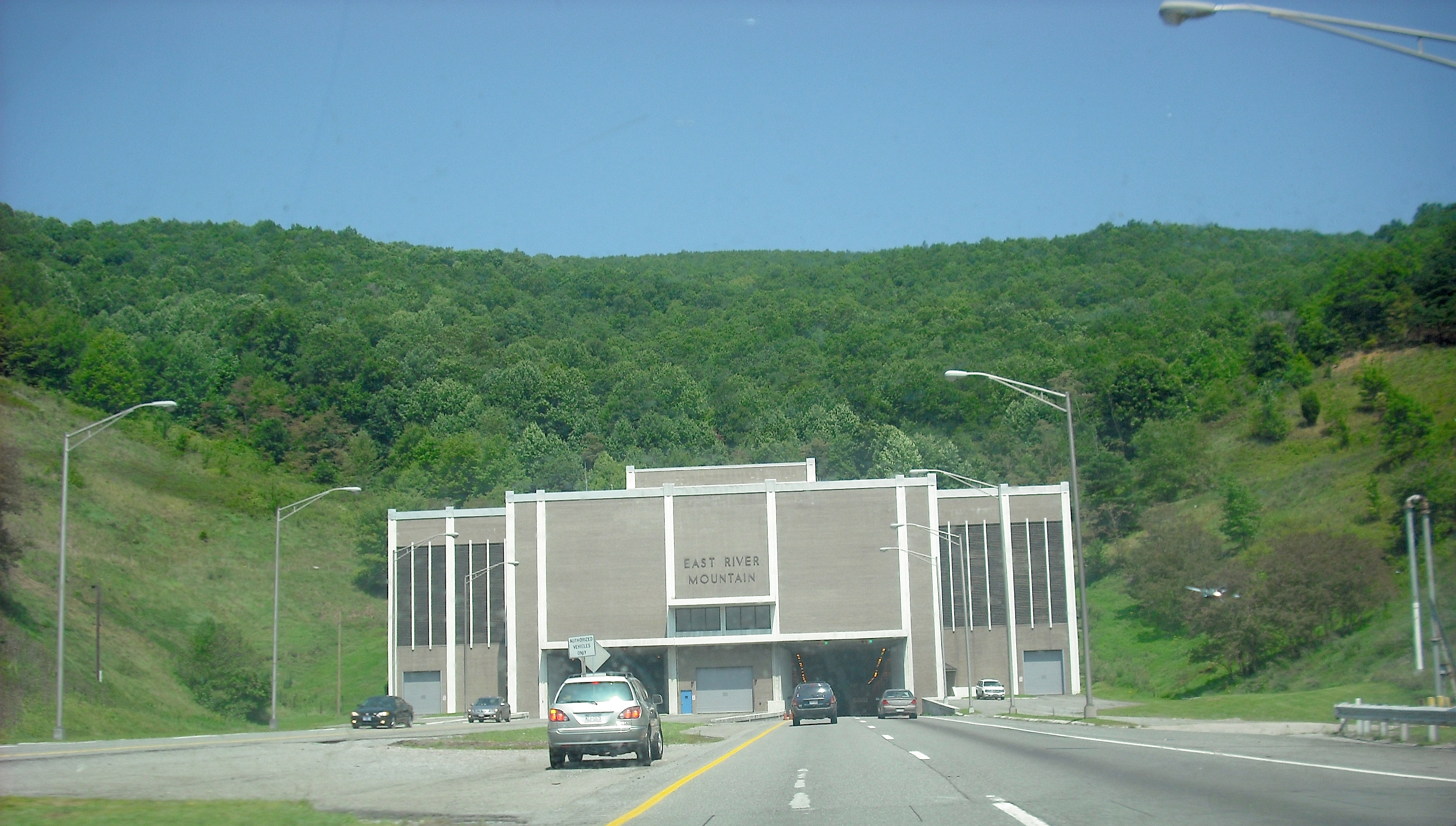
- Entrance to the East River Mountain Tunnel, Virginia side
- Interactive map of East River Mountain Tunnel

Overview
- Location: Bland County, Virginia; Mercer County, West Virginia
- Coordinates: 37°16′30″N 81°07′26″W
- Route: I-77 / US 52

Operation
- Opened: December 20, 1974; 51 years ago

Technical
- Length: 5,412 ft (1,649.58 m)
- No. of lanes: 4

The East River Mountain Tunnel is a 5,412-foot (1,650 m) vehicular tunnel that carries Interstate 77 (I-77) and U.S. Route 52 (US 52) through East River Mountain between Bluefield, West Virginia, and Rocky Gap, Virginia.

== History ==
Construction began on August 12, 1969, and it opened on December 20, 1974. At a cost of $40 million (equivalent to $197 million in 2024), it was the most expensive construction project undertaken by the West Virginia Division of Highways at the time. The northern 51% of the tunnel is in West Virginia and the southern 49% in Virginia; Virginia shared the cost of the project.

Before the opening of the East River Mountain Tunnel, travelers wishing to cross the state line had to navigate the narrow, twisting, guardrail-less route of US 52 up and over the mountain (now designated as SR 598 and WV 598). When fog or snow was present, the journey became arduous, and the road was occasionally closed completely (particularly in the winter months) due to treacherous conditions.

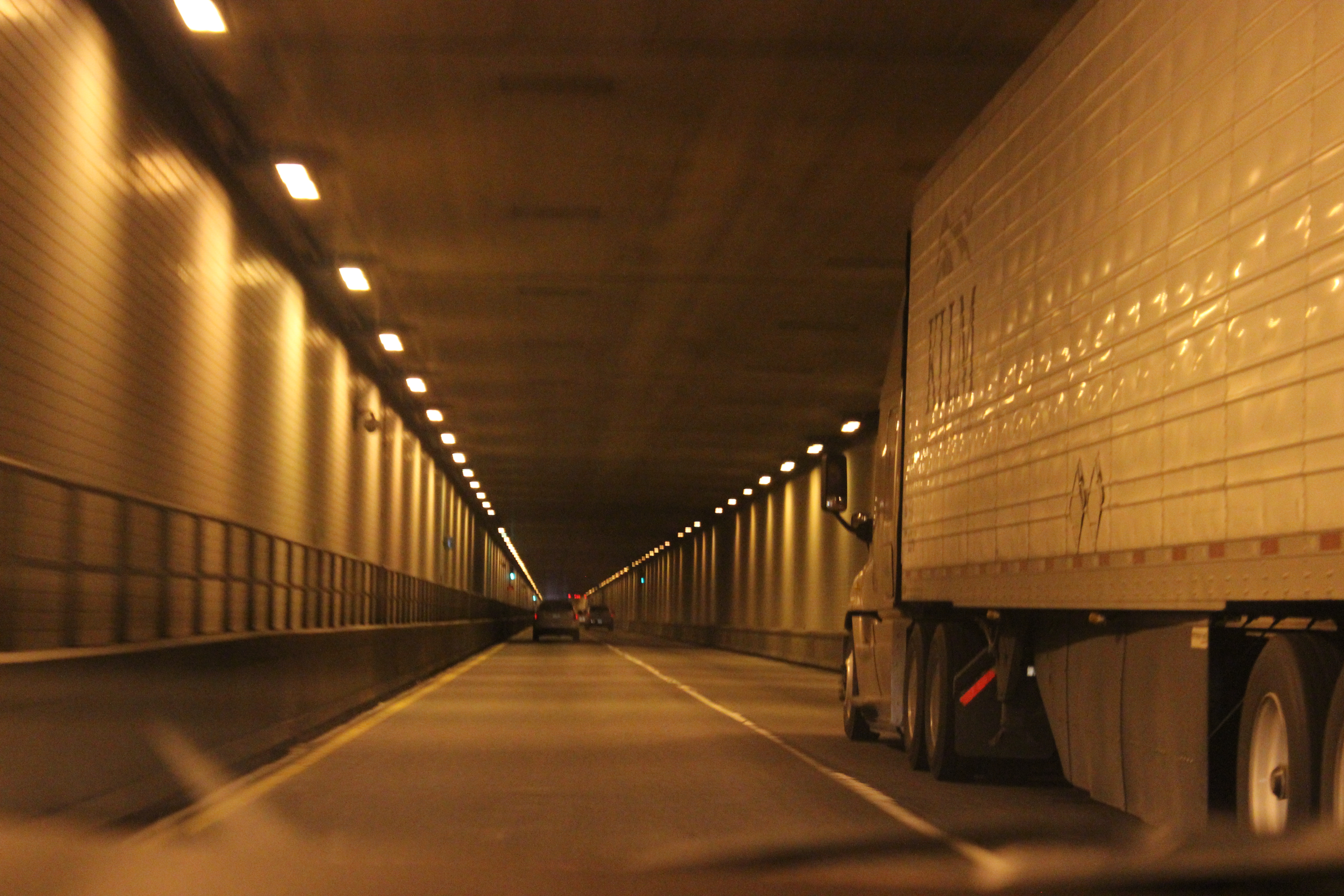
Inside the East River Mountain Tunnel heading south

== Location ==
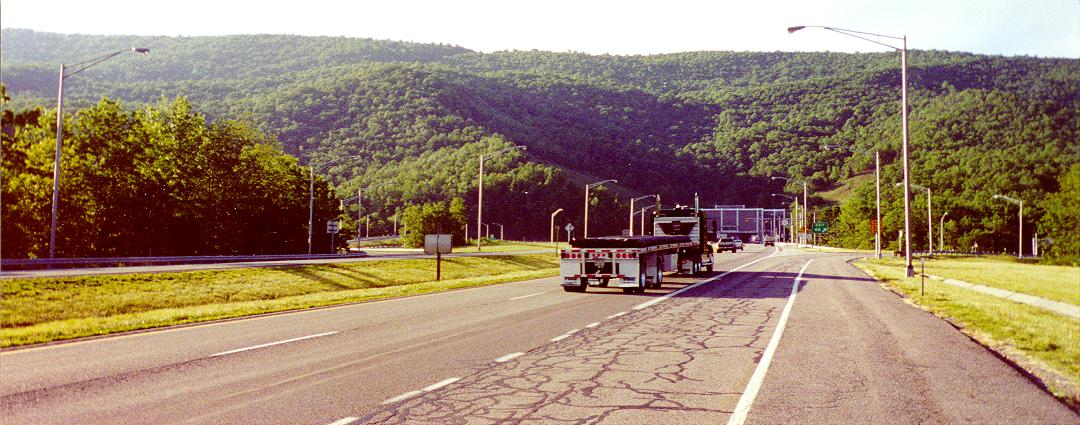
Northbound at East River Mountain Tunnel

The tunnel is located about 20 miles (32 km) north of its shorter cousin, the Big Walker Mountain Tunnel. The East River Mountain Tunnel is one of two land vehicular tunnels in the United States that cross a state line, the other being the Cumberland Gap Tunnel.

The top of East River Mountain can be seen in the distance from Big Walker Lookout, a 100-foot (30 m) observation tower built on Big Walker Mountain.

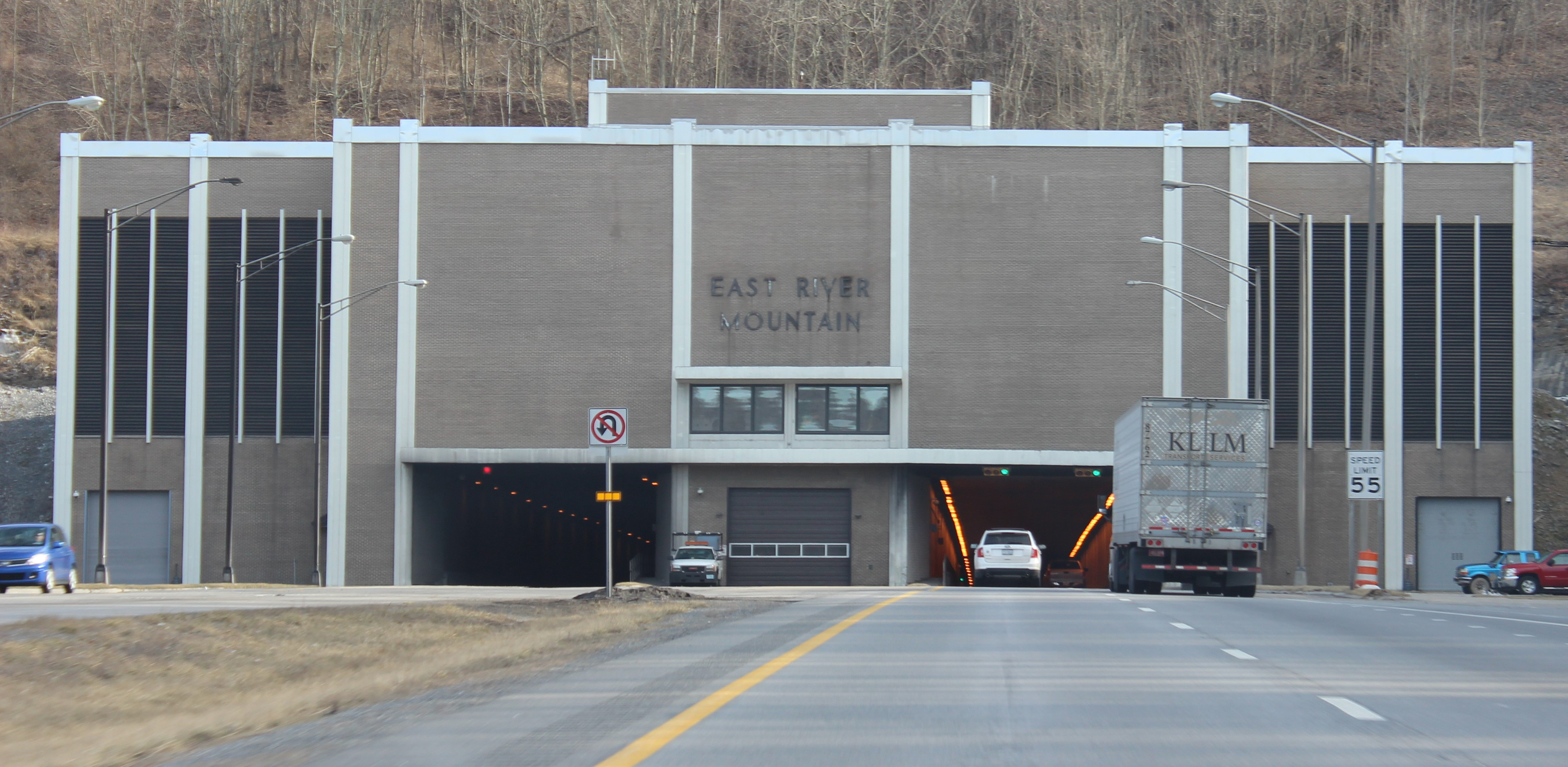
Entering the East River Mountain Tunnel from West Virginia
