= Hicksville, Virginia =

Unincorporated community in Virginia, United States

- Unincorporated community
- Location within Virginia Location within the United States
- Coordinates: 37°11′35″N 81°08′05″W
- Country: United States
- State: Virginia
- County: Bland
- Elevation: 2,119 ft (646 m)
- Time zone: UTC-5 (Eastern (EST))
  - Summer (DST): UTC-4 (EDT)
- Area code: 276
- GNIS feature ID: 1493080

Hicksville is an unincorporated community in Bland County, Virginia, United States. The community is located on U.S. Route 52, 6.4 miles (10.3 km) north of Bland.
