= Bland County Public Schools =

School division in Virginia, USA

Address
- 361 Bears Trail Bastian, Virginia, 24314; United States

District information
- Type: Public
- Grades: Pre-K through 12
- Superintendent: Laura Radford
- School board: 4 members
- Chair of the board: Phillip Buttery
- Governing agency: Virginia Department of Education
- Schools: 2

Other information
- Website: bland.k12.va.us/index.jsp

Bland County Public School is a school division in Virginia that serves the students of Bland County, Virginia. Located in southwestern Virginia, the district serves about 800 students and administers two schools: one elementary school and one high school.

== Administration ==
The Superintendent of Bland County Public Schools is Laura Radford. Prior to being appointed in 2022, Radford was the Supervisor of Special Services for the district.

The Bland County Board of Education has four members:

- Duane Bailey, Mechanicsburg District, Vice-Chairman
- Dave Andrews, Seddon District, Member,
- Phillip Buttery, Sharon District, Chairman
- Jerri Harman, Rocky Gap District,
- Michelle Willard, Clerk of the Board

== Academics ==
Bland County Public Schools has an afterschool STEM program for students. The program encourages students to collaborate with their school and community to help solve real-world problems. Both schools in Bland County Public Schools receive Title I funding and are fully accredited by the Virginia Department of Education.

== Schools ==
Bland County has two schools: Bland County High School (grades 7–12) and Bland County Elementary School (grades PreK-6).
