= Virginia State Route 598 =

State highway in Bland County, Virginia, US

State Route 598
- East River Mountain Road

Route information
- Maintained by VDOT
- Length: 4.16 mi (6.69 km)
- Existed: c. 1980–present

Major junctions
- South end: I-77 / US 52 near Rocky Gap
- North end: WV 598 near Bluefield, WV

Location
- Country: United States
- State: Virginia
- Counties: Bland

Highway system
- Virginia Routes; Interstate; US; Primary; Secondary; Byways; History; HOT lanes
← I-581	→ I-664

State Route 598 (SR 598) is a primary state highway in the U.S. state of Virginia. Known as East River Mountain Road, the state highway runs 4.16 miles (6.69 km) from Interstate 77 (I-77) and U.S. Route 52 (US 52) near Rocky Gap north to the West Virginia state line near Bluefield, West Virginia, where the highway continues as West Virginia Route 598 (WV 598). SR 598 is the old alignment of US 52 on East River Mountain in far northern Bland County.

== Route description ==
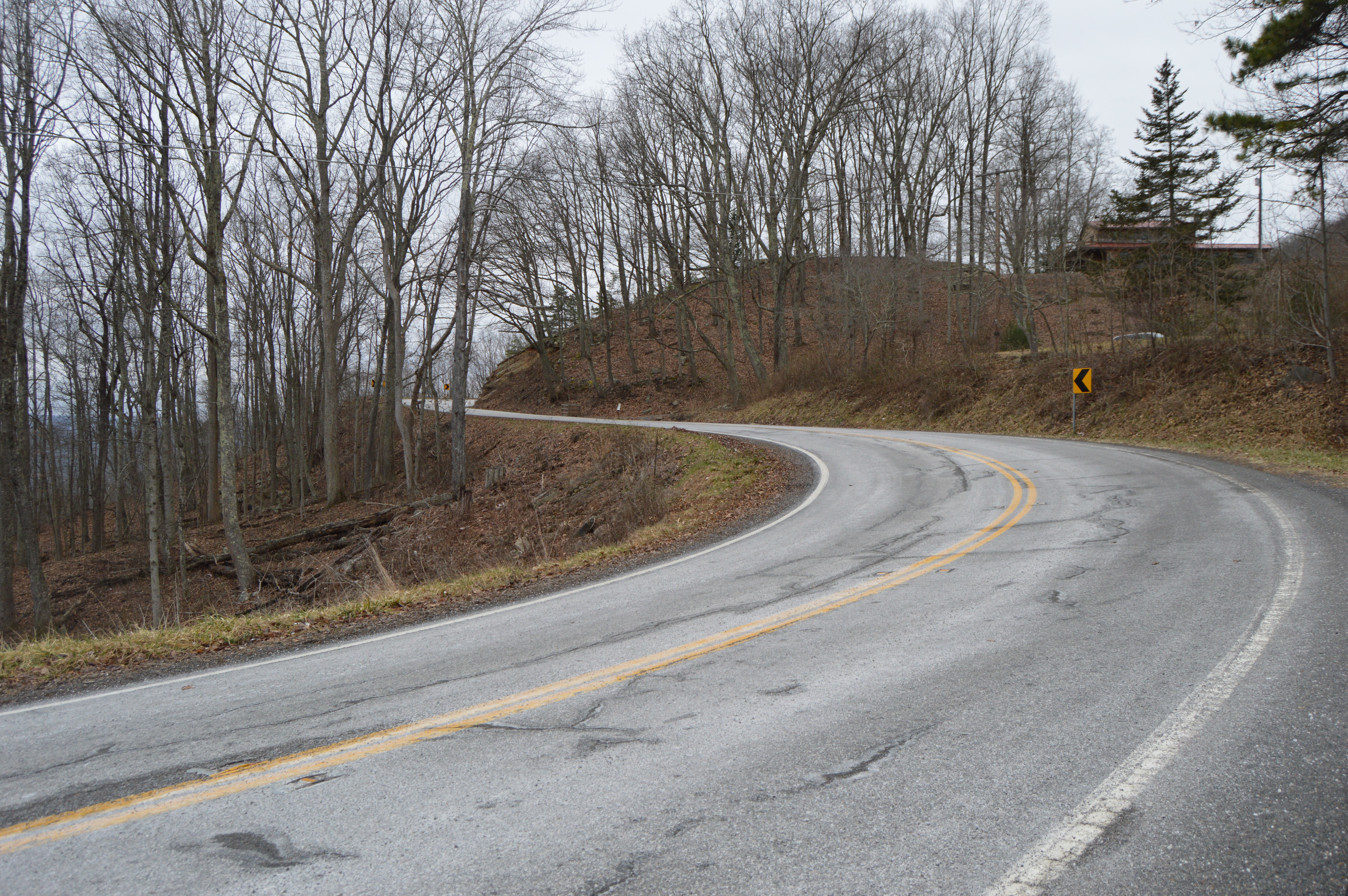
Curves approaching the summit of East River Mountain

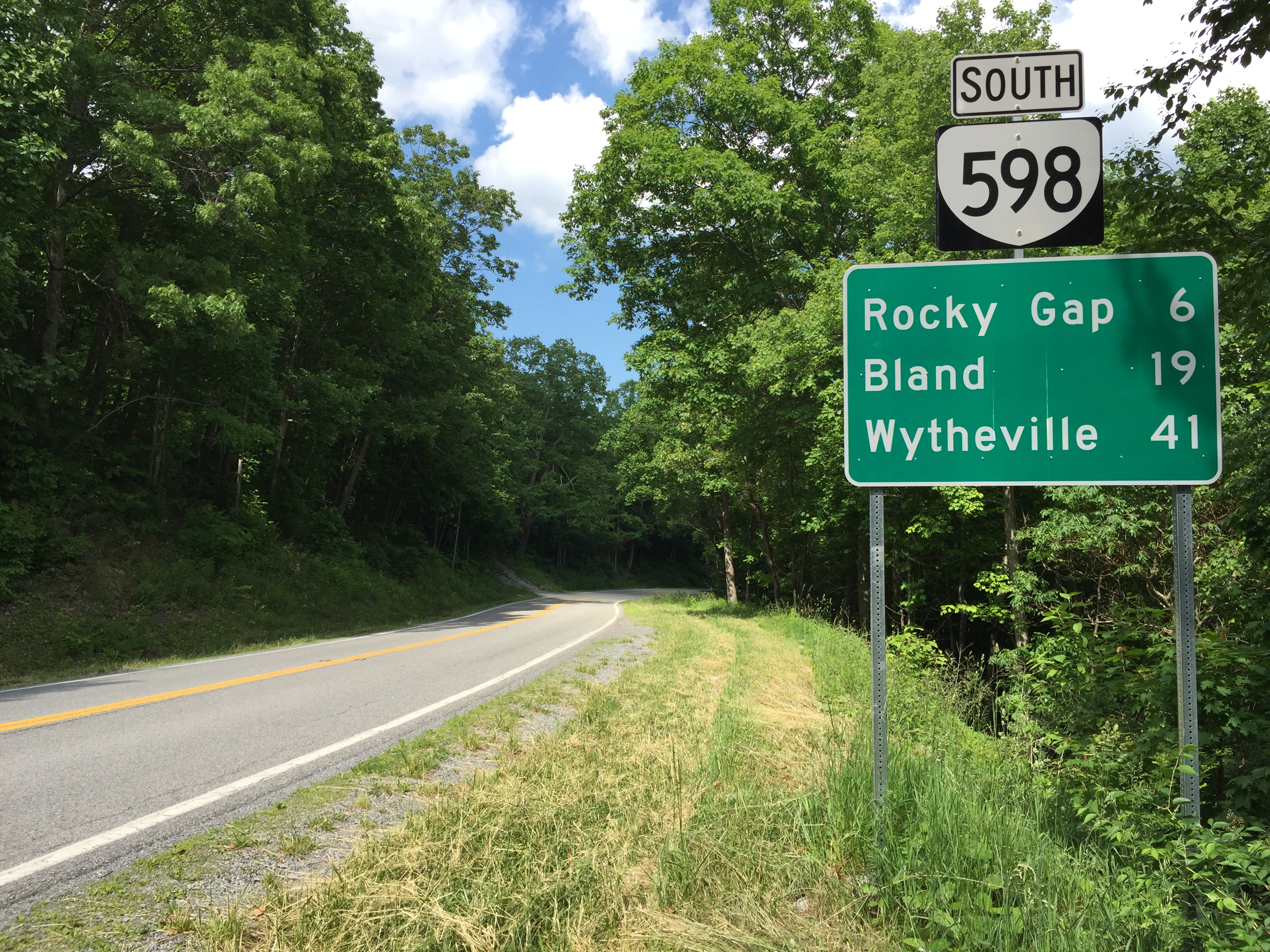
View south along SR 598 just south of the West Virginia state line

SR 598 begins at a partial cloverleaf interchange with I-77 and US 52. The interchange is along the lower slopes of East River Mountain, down which the roadway continues as US 52 (Scenic Highway) toward the hamlet of Rocky Gap in the narrow valley to the south of the mountain. I-77 and US 52 run concurrently north from the interchange into the East River Mountain Tunnel into West Virginia. SR 598 heads west as a two-lane undivided road that curvaceously ascends the mountain without the benefit of climbing lanes. The state highway reaches its northern terminus on the ridgeline of the mountain, which serves as the Virginia – West Virginia state line. The roadway continues west as WV 598 (Bland Road) and descends the north side of the mountain into the city of Bluefield.

== Major intersections ==
The entire route is in Bland County.

Location	mi	km	Destinations	Notes
	0.00	0.00	I-77 / US 52 (North Scenic Highway) – Beckley, Wytheville	Exit 66 (I-77); southern terminus
	4.16	6.69	WV 598 north (Bland Road) – Bluefield	West Virginia state line (East River Mountain); northern terminus
1.000 mi = 1.609 km; 1.000 km = 0.621 mi
