= Interstate 77 =

Interstate Highway from South Carolina to Ohio

Interstate 77
- I-77 highlighted in red

Route information
- Length: 610.10 mi (981.86 km)
- NHS: Entire route

Major junctions
- South end: I-26 in Cayce, SC
- I-20 in Columbia, SC; I-85 in Charlotte, NC; I-40 in Statesville, NC; I-74 near Mt. Airy, NC; I-81 between Fort Chiswell and Wytheville, VA; I-64 between Beckley and Charleston, WV; I-79 near Charleston, WV; I-70 in Cambridge, OH; I-76 in Akron, OH; I-80 in Richfield, OH
- North end: I-90 in Cleveland, OH

Location
- Country: United States
- States: South Carolina, North Carolina, Virginia, West Virginia, Ohio

Highway system
- Interstate Highway System; Main; Auxiliary; Suffixed; Business; Future

Interstate 77 (I-77) is a north–south Interstate Highway in the Eastern United States. It traverses diverse terrain, from the mountainous state of West Virginia to the rolling farmlands of North Carolina and Ohio. It largely supplants the old U.S. Route 21 (US 21) between Cleveland, Ohio, and Columbia, South Carolina, as an important north–south corridor through the middle Appalachian Mountains. The southern terminus of I-77 is in Cayce, South Carolina, in Lexington County at the junction with I-26. The northern terminus is in Cleveland at the junction with I-90. Other major cities that I-77 connects to include Columbia, South Carolina; Charlotte, North Carolina; Charleston, West Virginia; and Akron, Ohio. The East River Mountain Tunnel, connecting Virginia and West Virginia, is one of only two instances in the U.S. where a mountain road tunnel crosses a state line. The other is the Cumberland Gap Tunnel, connecting Tennessee and Kentucky. I-77 is a snowbird route to the Southern U.S. for those traveling from the Great Lakes region.

== Route description ==
Lengths
	mi	km
SC	91.05	146.53
NC	105.50	169.79
VA	69.40	111.69
WV	187.21	301.29
OH	160.13	257.70
Total	610.10	981.86

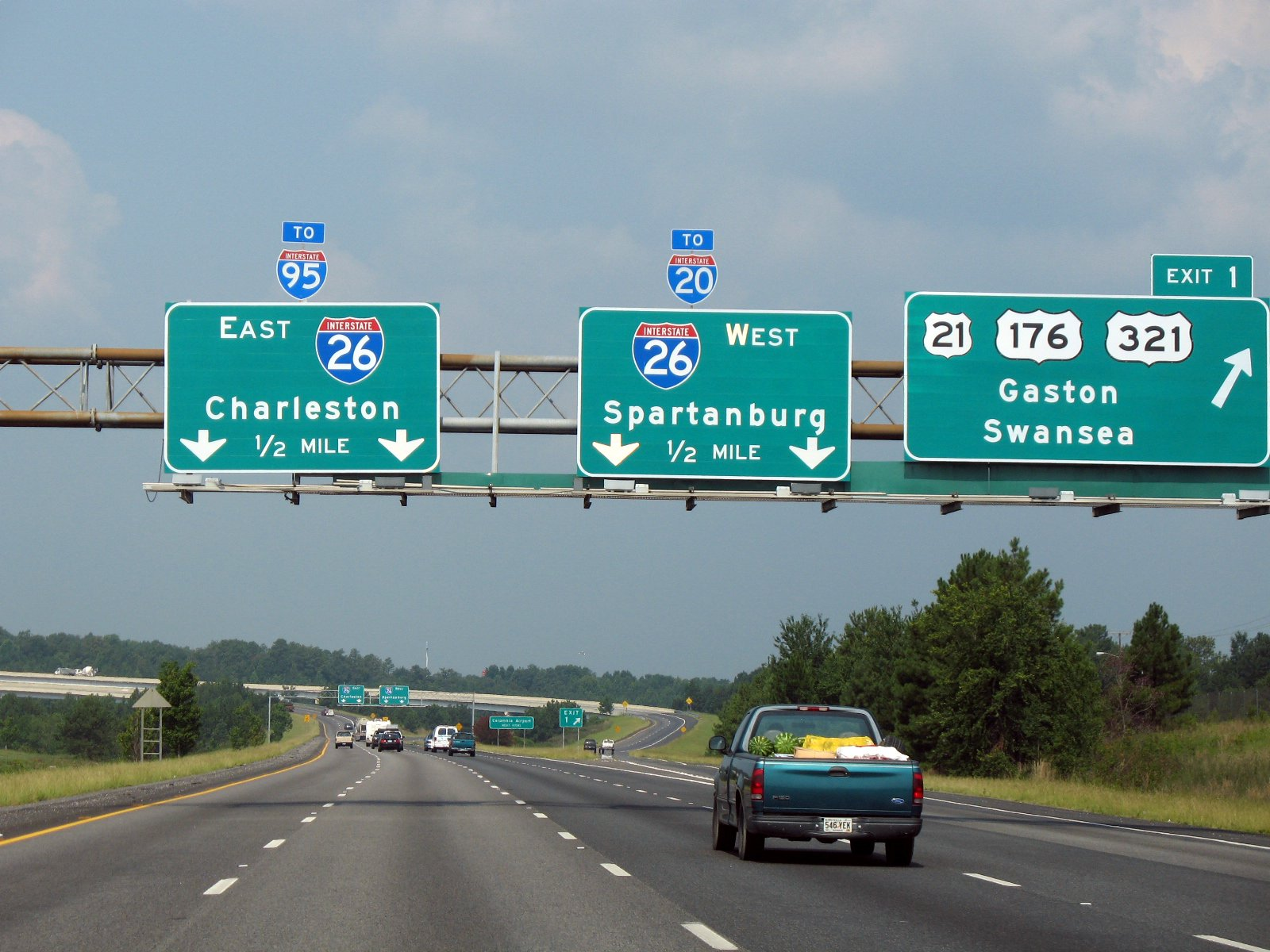
Southern terminus of I-77 at I-26 in Cayce, South Carolina

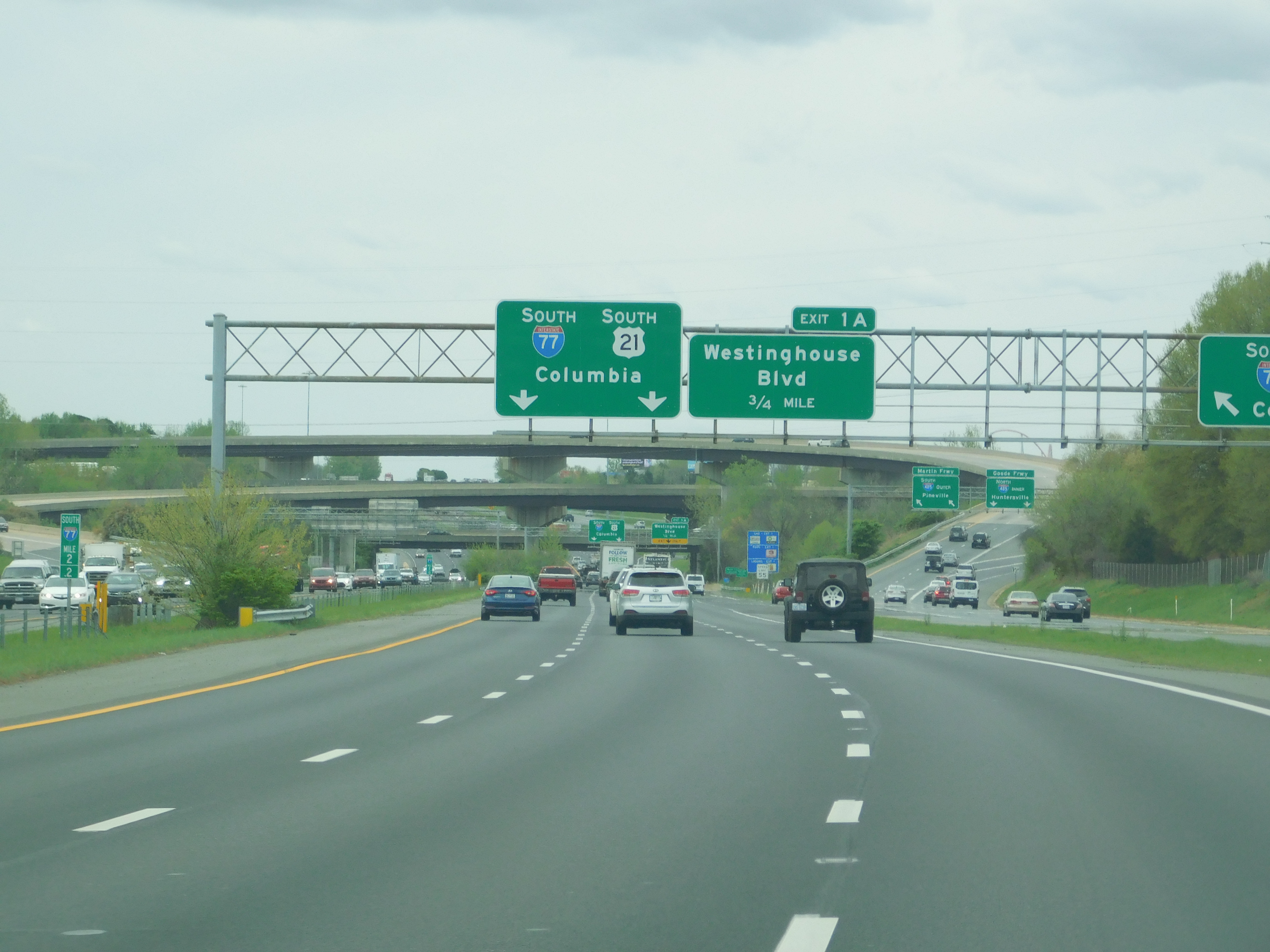
I-77/US 21 southbound at I-485 in Charlotte, North Carolina

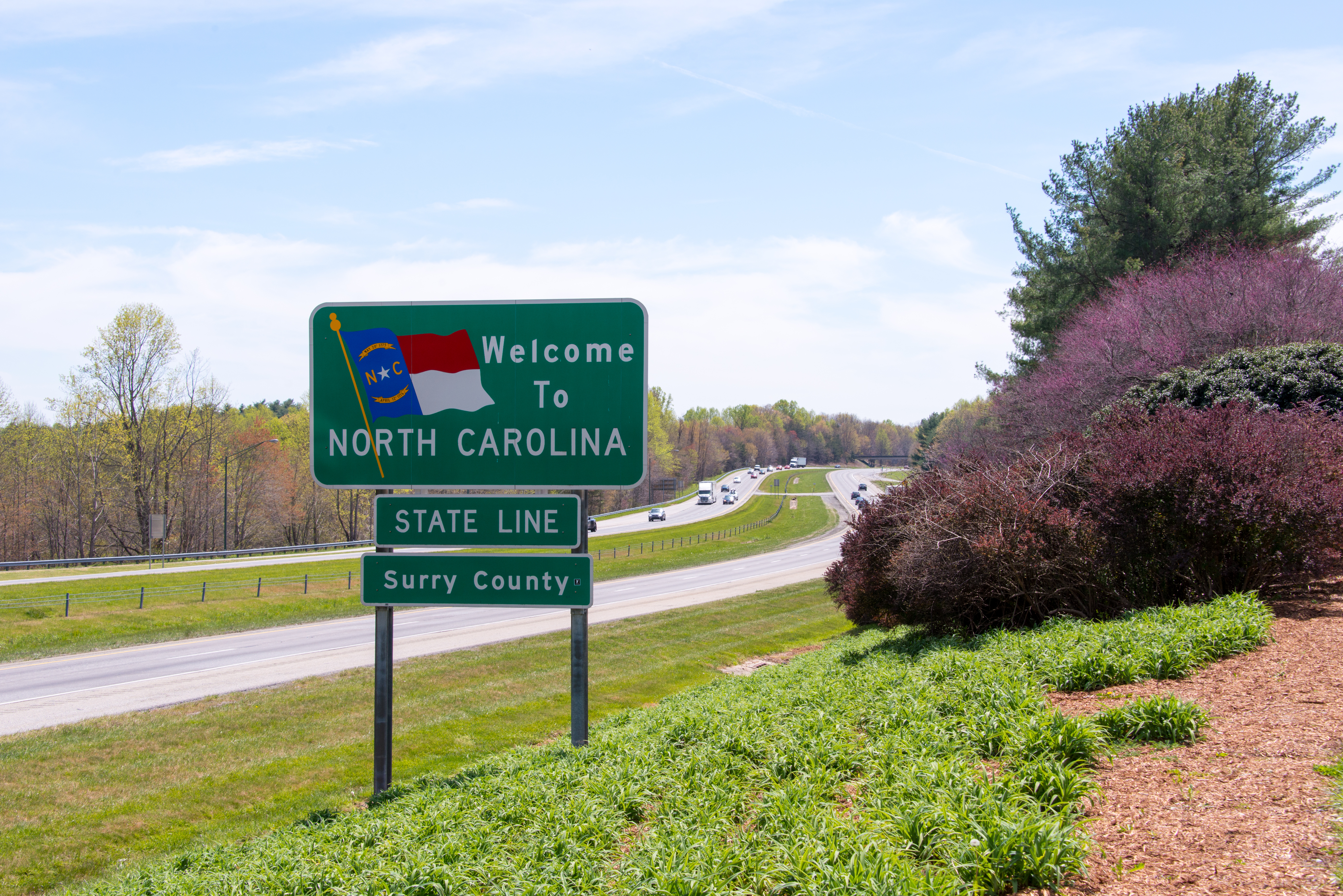
I-74/I-77 entering North Carolina from Virginia

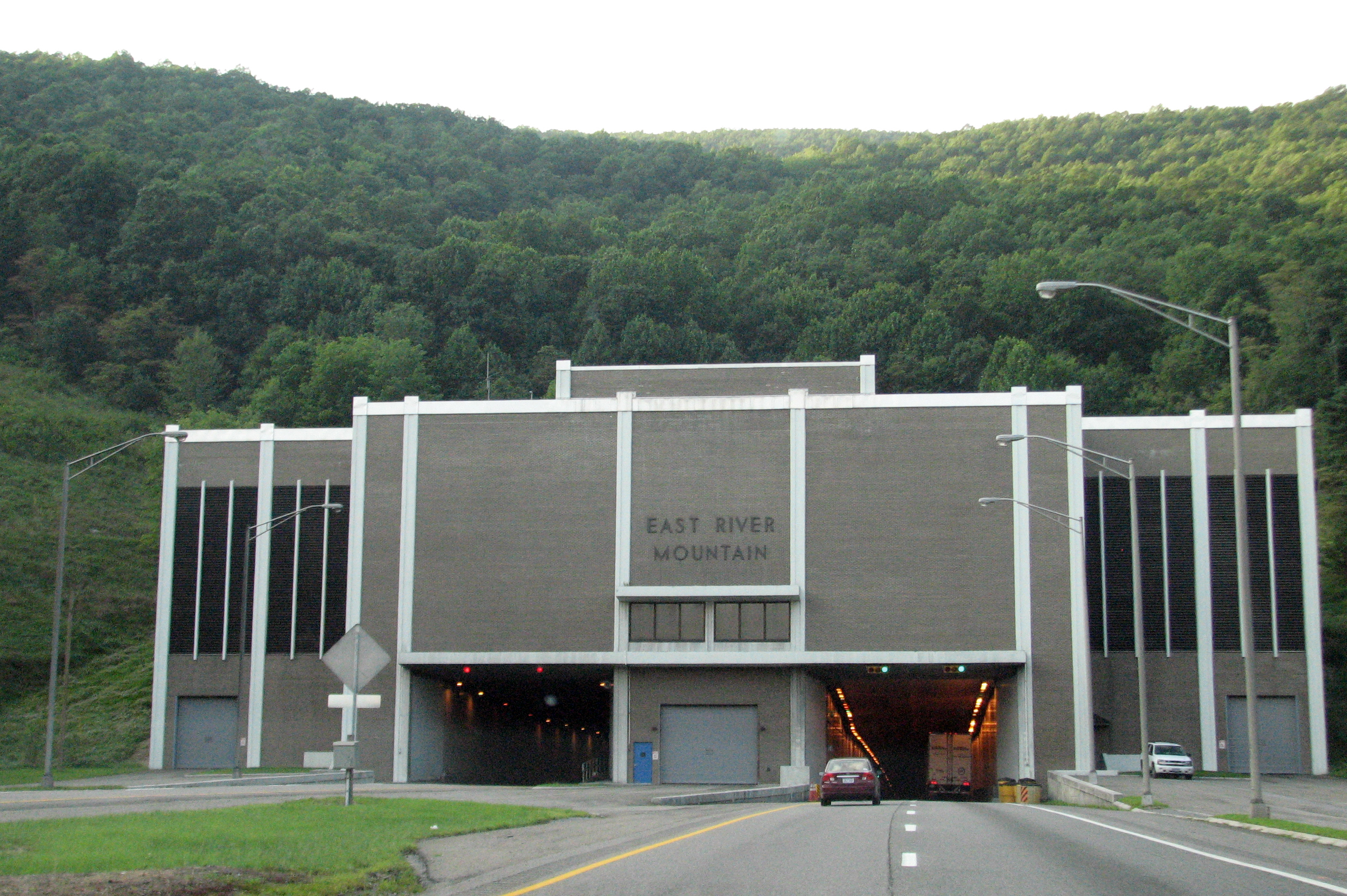
Northbound at the East River Mountain Tunnel, at the border of Virginia and West Virginia

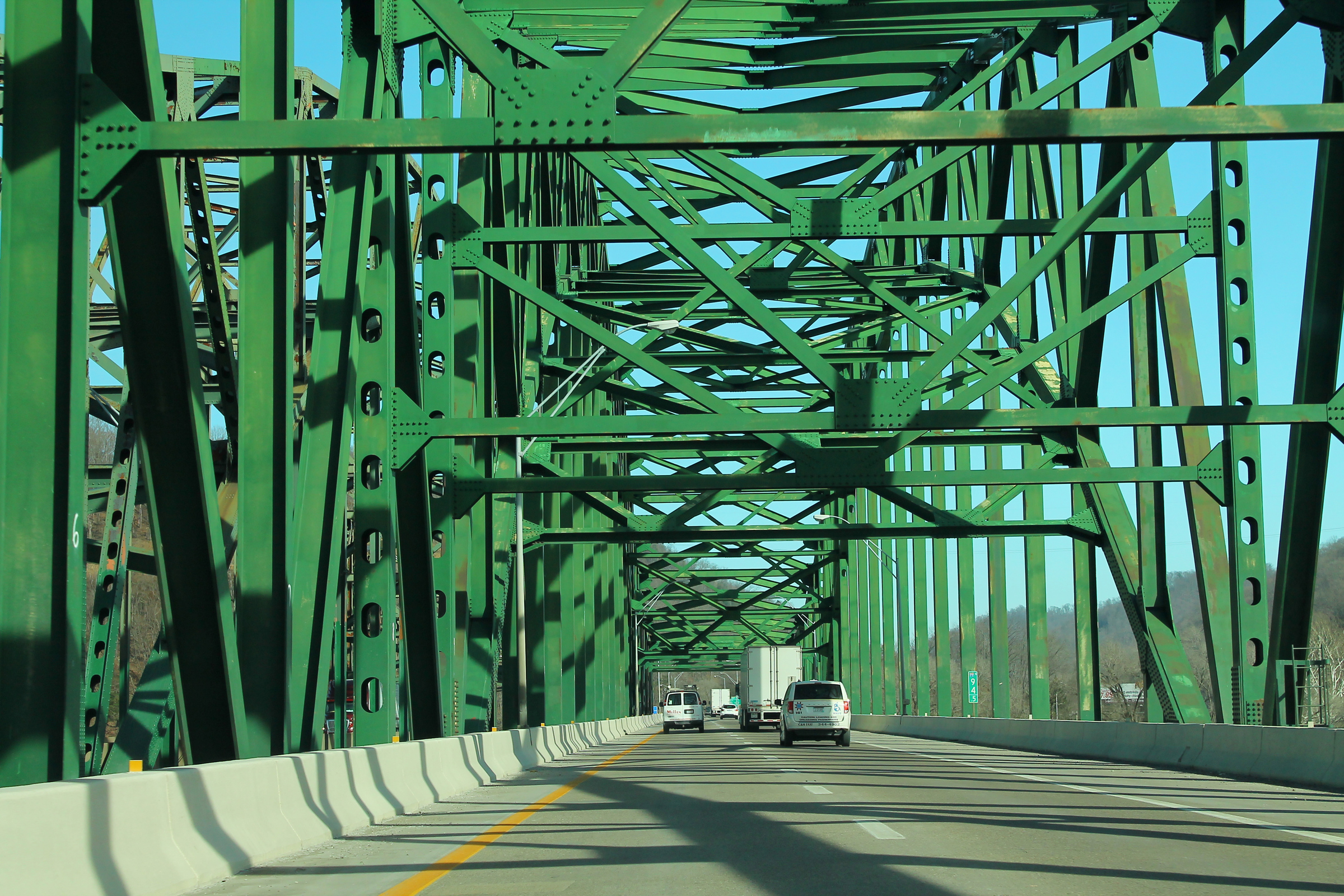
I-77 crossing the Kanawha River on the Chuck Yeager Bridge in Charleston, West Virginia

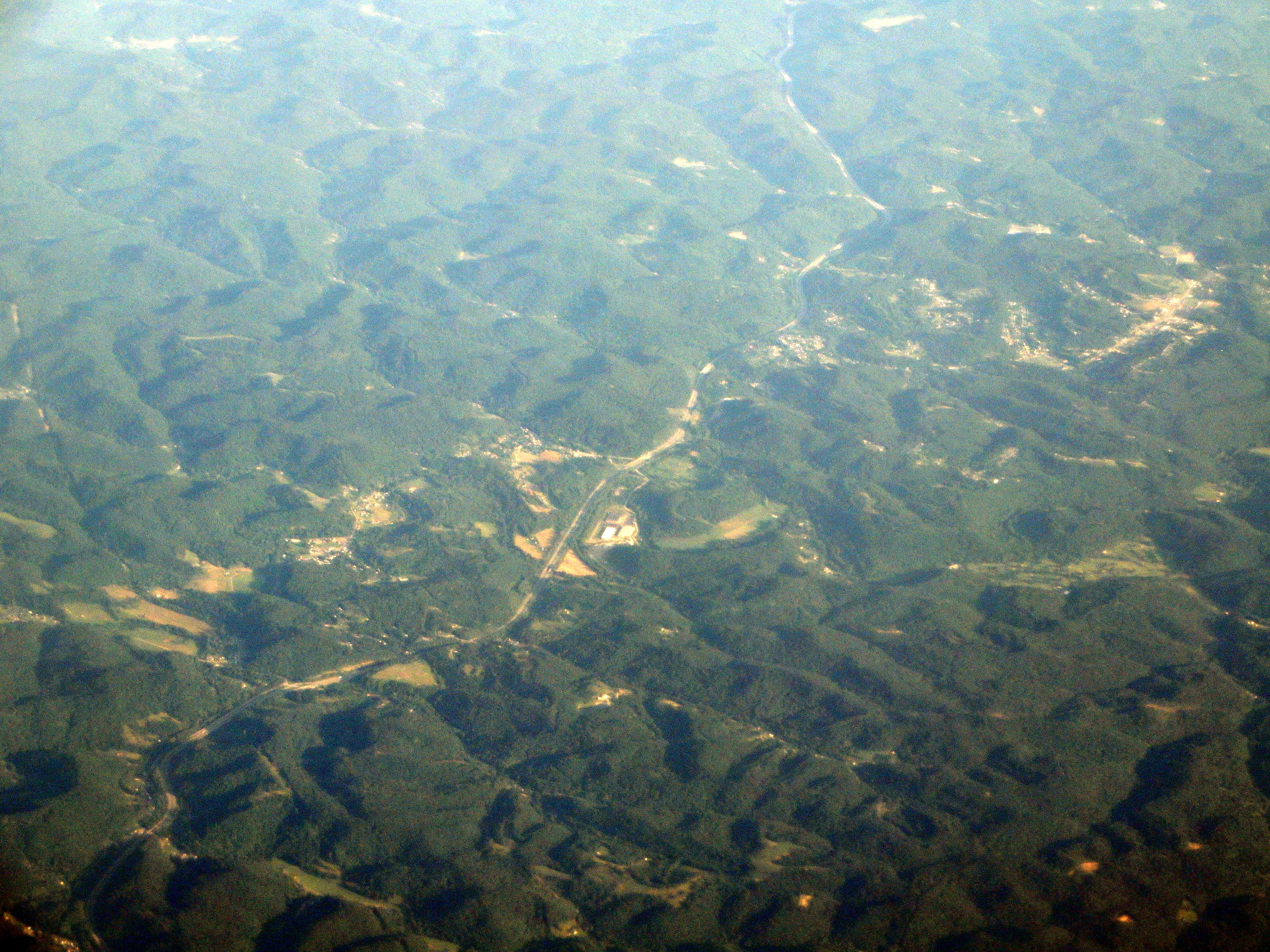
Aerial view of I-77 passing through Kanawha County, West Virginia near Sissonville

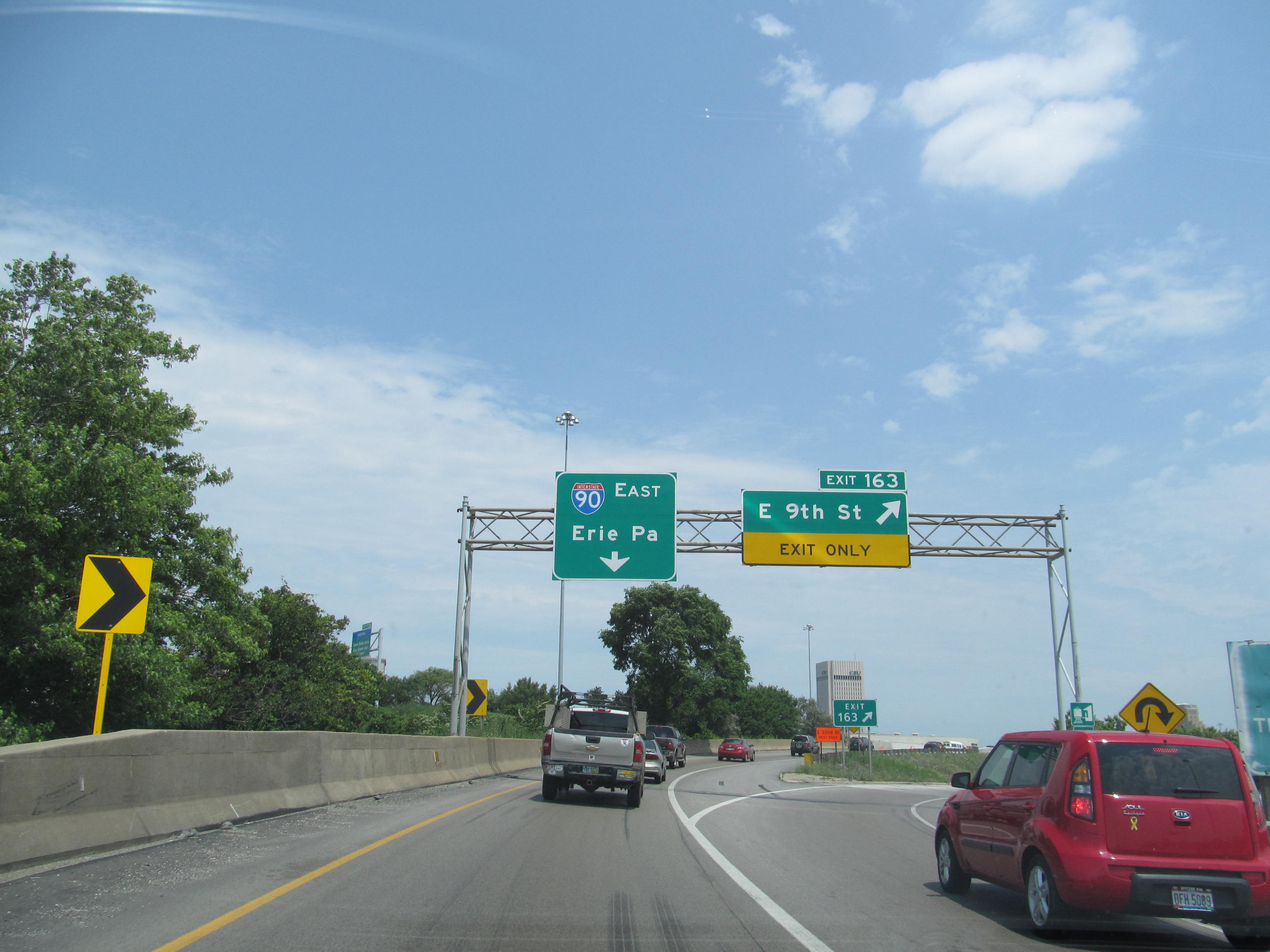
Northern terminus at I-90 in Cleveland, Ohio

=== South Carolina ===
I-77 begins as an eight-lane highway at I-26 in the far southwestern part of the Columbia metropolitan area. In the Columbia area, I-77 offers access to Fort Jackson before meeting I-20 in the northeastern part of the city. This segment of I-77, combined with I-20 and I-26, form a beltway around Columbia, though it is not officially designated as such.

After leaving the northern Columbia suburb of Blythewood, I-77 narrows to four lanes until it widens to eight lanes at Rock Hill from exit 77 to the North Carolina state line at I-485.

The final section of the entire length of I-77 was completed in Columbia in 1995.

=== North Carolina ===
I-77 through North Carolina begins at the South Carolina state line at Pineville. It narrows to six lanes on the North Carolina side south of Charlotte and then widens to 8 and 10 lanes through downtown before entering the North Carolina Piedmont region. In Charlotte, it intersects I-85 as well as intersecting each of the loops of I-485 and I-277 (twice). North of Charlotte, it skirts Lake Norman where it narrows again to four lanes before passing through Huntersville, Cornelius, Davidson, and Mooresville. At Statesville, 40 miles (64 km) north of I-85, it intersects I-40 and US 70. Next, it crosses over US 421 in Yadkin County and continues on through Elkin. The final intersection in the state is with a discontinuous section of I-74 near Mount Airy.

I-77 in Charlotte is also known as the Bill Lee Freeway; this designation stretches from exit 6 (South Tryon Street/Woodlawn Road) in Charlotte to exit 33 (US 21 north), near Mooresville. A six-mile (9.7 km) portion south of the city is called the General Younts Expressway. When I-77 crosses over I-85 (which runs in an east–west direction through the interchange), the northbound lanes are to the west of the southbound lanes.

North Carolina completed its section of I-77 in 1975.

=== Virginia ===
I-77 through Virginia passes through two tunnels: the Big Walker and East River mountain tunnels. For eight miles (13 km), I-77 and I-81 overlap near Wytheville. This is a wrong-way concurrency, where two roads run concurrent with each other but are designated in opposite directions. For its entire length in Virginia, I-77 is either parallel to or concurrent with US 52. It will have a concurrency with I-74 throughout the state.

On March 31, 2013, there was a nearly 100-car pileup on I-77 near Fancy Gap; as a result of that crash, electronic variable speed limit signs are now in place along that stretch of I-77. The speed limit can be adjusted according to driving conditions at any given time.

=== West Virginia ===
I-77 enters West Virginia through the East River Mountain Tunnel. At milepost 9, I-77 becomes cosigned with the West Virginia Turnpike for the next 88 miles (142 km), a toll road between Princeton and Charleston. It is concurrent with I-64 to Charleston at Beckley. The speed limit is 70 mph (110 km/h) for most of the length, with a 60-mile-per-hour (97 km/h) limit for the section between Marmet and the toll plaza near Pax.

It enters Charleston via the Yeager Bridge before splitting off at a four-level junction with I-64. Two miles (3.2 km) north of the city center, it junctions with I-79, before proceeding north to Ripley and Parkersburg.

North of Charleston, I-77 is known as the Korean War Veterans Memorial Highway.

=== Ohio ===
Entering from West Virginia at Marietta, I-77 passes through rolling Appalachian terrain.

The interchange with I-70 at Cambridge is (or at least at one time was) thought to be the largest interchange in the world, covering over 300 acres (120 ha).

I-77 continues north through Canton and then Akron, where it connects with I-76. The interchange with I-80, the Ohio Turnpike, between Akron and Cleveland was completed in December 2001; previously, traffic had to exit at State Route 21 (SR 21) to access the turnpike. I-77 ends at I-90 in Cleveland.

I-77 is also known as the Vietnam Veterans Memorial Highway in Ohio and the Willow Freeway in Greater Cleveland.

== Junction list ==
South Carolina
I-26 in Cayce
US 21 / US 176 / US 321 in Cayce
US 76 / US 378 in Columbia
I-20 on the Woodfield–Dentsville CDP line
US 1 in Dentsville
US 21 south of Blythewood
US 21 on the Lesslie–Rock Hill line
US 21 in Rock Hill
US 21 north of Fort Mill. The highways travel concurrently to Charlotte, North Carolina.
North Carolina
I-485 in Charlotte
I-277 / US 74 in Charlotte
US 29 in Charlotte
I-277 in Charlotte
I-85 in Charlotte
I-485 in Huntersville
US 21 in Cornelius. The highways travel concurrently to Mooresville.
US 21 southeast of Troutman
US 70 in Statesville
I-40 in Statesville
US 21 north of Statesville
US 421 west-northwest of Hamptonville
US 21 south-southeast of Jonesville. The highways travel concurrently to Elkin.
I-74 west-southwest of Pine Ridge. The highways travel concurrently to the Virginia state line north-northwest of Pine Ridge.
Virginia
US 58 / US 221 in Woodlawn
I-81 / US 11 in Fort Chiswell. The highways travel concurrently to Wytheville.
US 52 in Fort Chiswell. The highways travel concurrently to Wytheville.
US 52 west of Bland
US 52 in Rocky Gap
US 52 north-northwest of Rocky Gap. The highways travel concurrently to Bluefield, West Virginia.
West Virginia
US 460 east-southeast of Princeton
US 19 south-southeast of Camp Creek
I-64 southeast of Crab Orchard. The highways travel concurrently to Charleston.
US 60 southeast of Snow Hill. The highways travel concurrently to Charleston.
I-79 northeast of Charleston
US 33 in Ripley. The highways travel concurrently to Silverton.
US 50 east of Parkersburg
Ohio
SR 7 in Marietta
I-70 south-southeast of Cambridge
US 40 east of Cambridge
US 22 northeast of Cambridge
US 36 in Newcomerstown
US 250 in New Philadelphia. The highways travel concurrently to south-southeast of Strasburg.
US 30 / US 62 in Canton. I-77/US 62 travels concurrently through Canton.
I-277 / US 224 south of Akron
I-76 / SR 8 in Akron. I-76 and I-77 travel concurrently through Akron.
SR 21 West of Akron
I-271 in Richfield
I-80 on the Richfield–Brecksville line
I-480 on the Independence–Brooklyn Heights line
I-490 in Cleveland
US 422 in Cleveland
I-90 in Cleveland

== Auxiliary routes ==
- I-277 – Charlotte, North Carolina
- I-277 – Akron, Ohio
