= Virginia State Route 15 =

The following highways in Virginia have been known as State Route 15:

- State Route 15 (Virginia 1918–1923), the portion of State Route 59 (Virginia 1940-1949) from West Virginia to Woodstock, Virginia
- State Route 15 (Virginia 1923–1933), now U.S. Route 52 in Virginia and Virginia State Route 121 from North Carolina to Max Meadows, Virginia
- U.S. Route 15 (Virginia), 1926–present
