= VA15 =

VA-15 has the following meanings:

- Attack Squadron 15 (U.S. Navy)
- Virginia's 15th congressional district
- Virginia State Route 15 (disambiguation)
