= Virginia State Route 121 =

State highway in Wythe County, Virginia, US

State Route 121
- Max Meadows Road

Route information
- Maintained by VDOT
- Length: 1.83 mi (2.95 km)
- Existed: 1933–present
- Tourist routes: Virginia Byway

Major junctions
- South end: I-81 / I-77 / US 11 / US 52 at Fort Chiswell
- North end: SR 1004 / SR 1006 in Max Meadows

Location
- Country: United States
- State: Virginia
- Counties: Wythe

Highway system
- Virginia Routes; Interstate; US; Primary; Secondary; Byways; History; HOT lanes
| ← US 121 | → SR 122 |

State Route 121 is a state highway in the U.S. state of Virginia. Known as Max Meadows Road, the state highway runs 1.83 miles (2.95 km) from Interstate 77, I-81, U.S. Route 11, and US 52 at Fort Chiswell north to SR 1004 and SR 1006 in Max Meadows in eastern Wythe County.

SR 121 is part of a Virginia Byway that continues south along US 52 and west along SR 610 to Wytheville.

== Route description ==
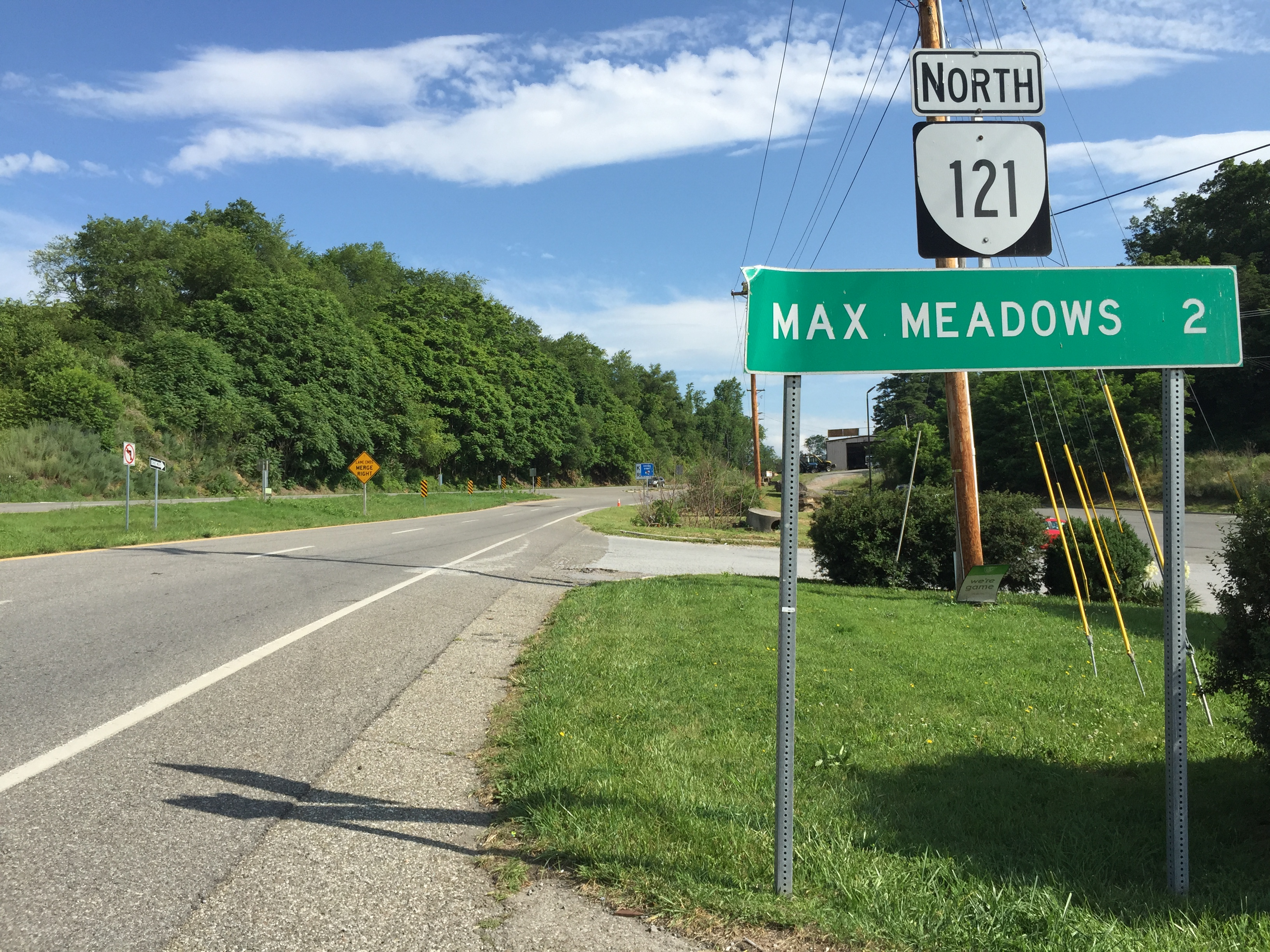
View north along SR 121 at I-77/I-81/US 11 and US 52 in Fort Chiswell

SR 121 begins at a diamond interchange with I-77, I-81, and US 11 a short distance west of the interchange where I-77 turns south toward Charlotte and I-81 and US 11 continue east toward Roanoke. US 52 runs concurrently with the three other highways west to Wytheville and heads south from the interchange as Fort Chiswell Road toward Hillsville. SR 121 starts as a four-lane divided highway within the interchange but immediately reduces to a two-lane undivided road to head north to Max Meadows. The state highway crosses Reed Creek before entering the village, where it reaches its northern terminus at its intersection with SR 1004 (Ayers Street) and SR 1006 (Max Meadows Road) immediately to the north of its grade crossing of Norfolk Southern Railway's Pulaski District rail line and one block south of SR 610 (Peppers Ferry Road).

== History ==
SR 121 was numbered in the 1933 renumbering as an extension of U.S. Route 121 (now US 52 south of Fort Chiswell). From 1931, when it was added to the state highway system, until 1933, SR 121 was part of the longer State Route 15, which also continued south on present US 52.

== Major intersections ==
The entire route is in Wythe County.

| Location | mi | km | Destinations | Notes |
|---|---|---|---|---|
| Fort Chiswell | 0.00 | 0.00 | I-77 / I-81 / US 11 / US 52 (Fort Chiswell Road) – Roanoke, Bristol | Exit 80 (I-81); southern terminus |
| Max Meadows | 1.83 | 2.95 | SR 1004 (Ayers Street) / SR 1006 (Max Meadows Road) to SR 610 west (Peppers Ferry Road) | Northern terminus |
1.000 mi = 1.609 km; 1.000 km = 0.621 mi
