= Bastian, Virginia =

Unincorporated community in Virginia, United States

- Census-designated place
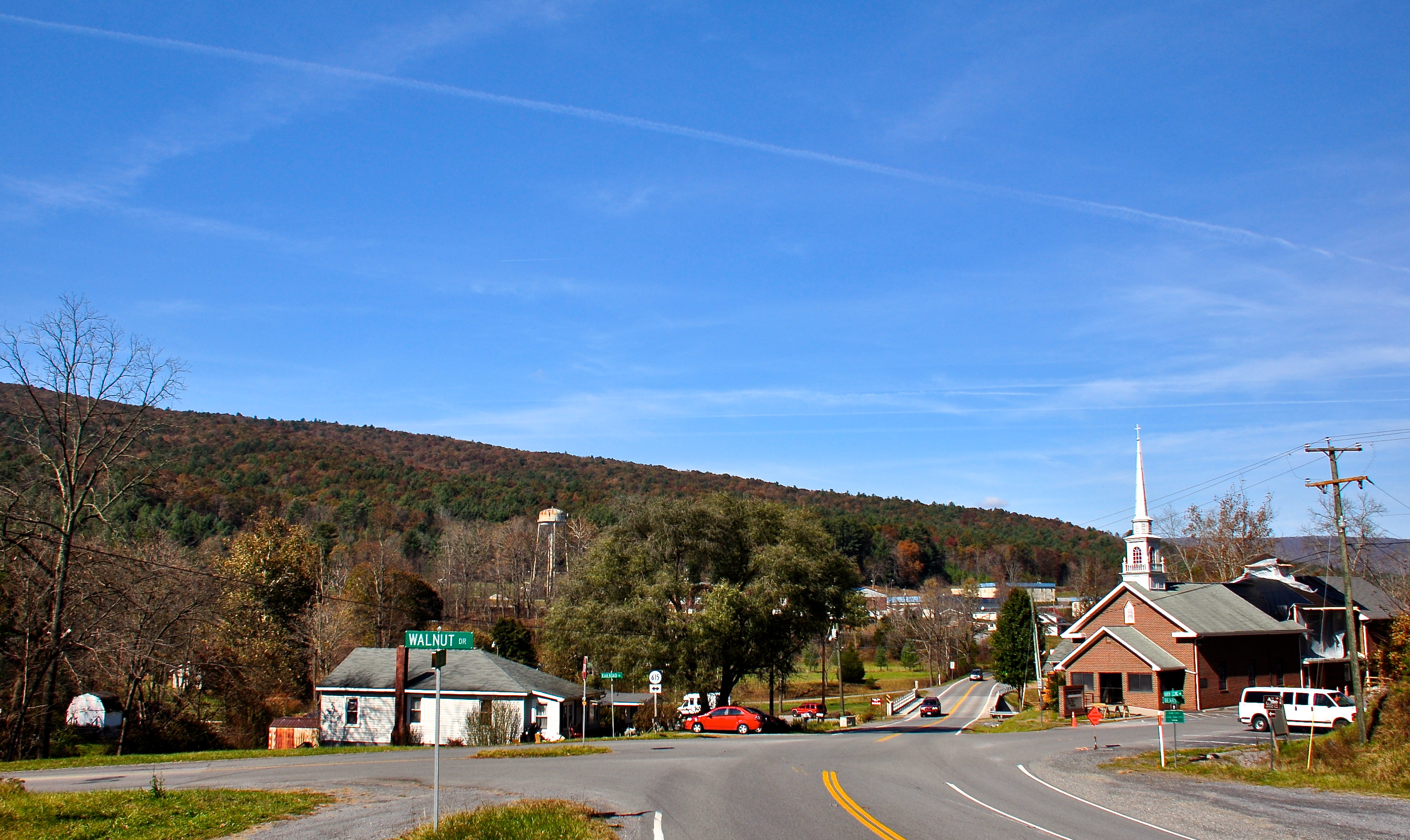
- Bastian, Virginia

- Location within Virginia Location within the United States
- Coordinates: 37°09′07″N 81°09′00″W
- Country: United States
- State: Virginia
- County: Bland

Area
  - Total: 1.17 sq mi (3.04 km^{2})
- Elevation: 2,182 ft (665 m)

Population (2020)
  - Total: 343
- Time zone: UTC-5 (Eastern (EST))
  - Summer (DST): UTC-4 (EDT)
- ZIP code: 24314
- Area code: 276
- GNIS feature ID: 1492520

Bastian is an unincorporated community and census-designated place (CDP) in Bland County, Virginia, United States. Bastian is 4 miles (6 km) north-northwest of Bland. It was first listed as a CDP in the 2020 census with a population of 343. Bastian has a post office with ZIP code 24314.

== History ==
The small Appalachian town of Bastian, Virginia, was first settled between the years of 1905 and 1908. Bastian was originally named Parkersburg after Parker Hornbarger, who, along with Jack Hager, owned most of the land the town was built upon. Much of this land was later owned by both James Starks and Eli Leedy. The name "Bastian" came from the manager of Bland County's only railroad, F.E. Bastian. The children of Bastian attended a one-room schoolhouse until 1923, when a larger school was built. Schools located near Hunting Camp Creek accommodated local students until then. With the arrival of the Virginia Hardwood Lumber Company in 1927, Bastian's population greatly increased. This increase made additional classrooms a necessity. Several small schools were built during this time. It was not until 1955, however, that the modern brick Bastian Elementary school building was built at the cost of $112,215.79. This building now serves as the Bland County Schoolboard Office.

Bastian has been home to many businesses and industries over the years. The W.F. White Lumber Company, the G.W. Miller Mining Planing Mill, the Canva Mining Company (manganese), the C&A Lumber Company, and the Tultex Sewing Factory have all operated in the town. The Virginia Hardwood Lumber Company operated a large double-band sawmill in Bastian from 1927 to 1944, employing 350 workers at their peak production. Today, General Injectables and Vaccines, a wholesale pharmaceuticals company, is one of the major employers. In the 1930s, Bastian was home to one of the most distinguished CCC camps of the New Deal, and thousands of young men passed through its doors.

As the lumber industry grew, new methods of transporting the materials were needed. In 1912, the New River, Holston, and Western Railroad company built a new railroad to Rocky Gap, Virginia. In 1914, W.E. Mingea Jr., of Abingdon, Virginia, who owned all the big surveys in Bland County, decided to build the railroad from Bastian to Suiter. This new rail line ran from Narrows, Virginia, up through the communities of Niday, Round Bottom, and Rocky Gap. It continued from there to Hicksville, Bastian, and Suiter. This train served many purposes, including transporting passengers, until it was discontinued in 1946.

In the early 1930s, Bastian became the first town in Bland County to use electricity. They received it from the generator of the Virginia Hardwood Lumber Co. Their massive generator produced enough electricity to run both the company and the town.

By the mid-1940s the CCC camp, Virginia Hardwood Lumber Company, and the railroad had all closed down.

In the early 1970s, Interstate 77 was constructed with its path lying just east of Bastian.

== Demographics ==
Bastian first appeared as a census designated place in the 2020 U.S. census.
