= Hicksville, Arkansas =

Unincorporated community in Arkansas, US

Coordinates: 34°35′21″N 90°58′30″W

Hicksville is an unincorporated community in Phillips County, Arkansas, United States.
