= Big Walker Mountain =

Mountain in the Appalachian Mountains

Coordinates: 37°02′43″N 81°13′45″W

Big Walker Mountain is a mountain ridge in the Appalachian Mountains of the western part of the U.S. state of Virginia. Walker's Creek flows along the northern foot of the mountain. The mountain is named after explorer Thomas Walker who passed through the area in 1749. Interstate 77 passes through the mountain through the Big Walker Mountain Tunnel.
