= Snow Hill, Kanawha County, West Virginia =

Snow Hill, West Virginia
- Unincorporated community
- Location within West Virginia Location within the United States
- Coordinates: 38°19′29″N 81°34′17″W
- Country: United States
- State: West Virginia
- County: Kanawha
- Elevation: 604 ft (184 m)
- Time zone: UTC-5 (Eastern (EST))
  - Summer (DST): UTC-4 (EDT)
- Area codes: 304 & 681
- GNIS feature ID: 1555656

Snow Hill is an unincorporated community in Kanawha County, West Virginia, United States. Snow Hill is 4 miles (6.4 km) southeast of downtown Charleston.

The community was descriptively named on account of nearby salt deposits.
