= Big Walker Lookout =

Observation tower in Virginia

Coordinates: 37°2′44.7″N 81°13′42.1″W

Big Walker Lookout is a 100 feet (30 m) observation tower located in the Blue Ridge Highlands Region atop Big Walker Mountain in Bland County, Virginia.

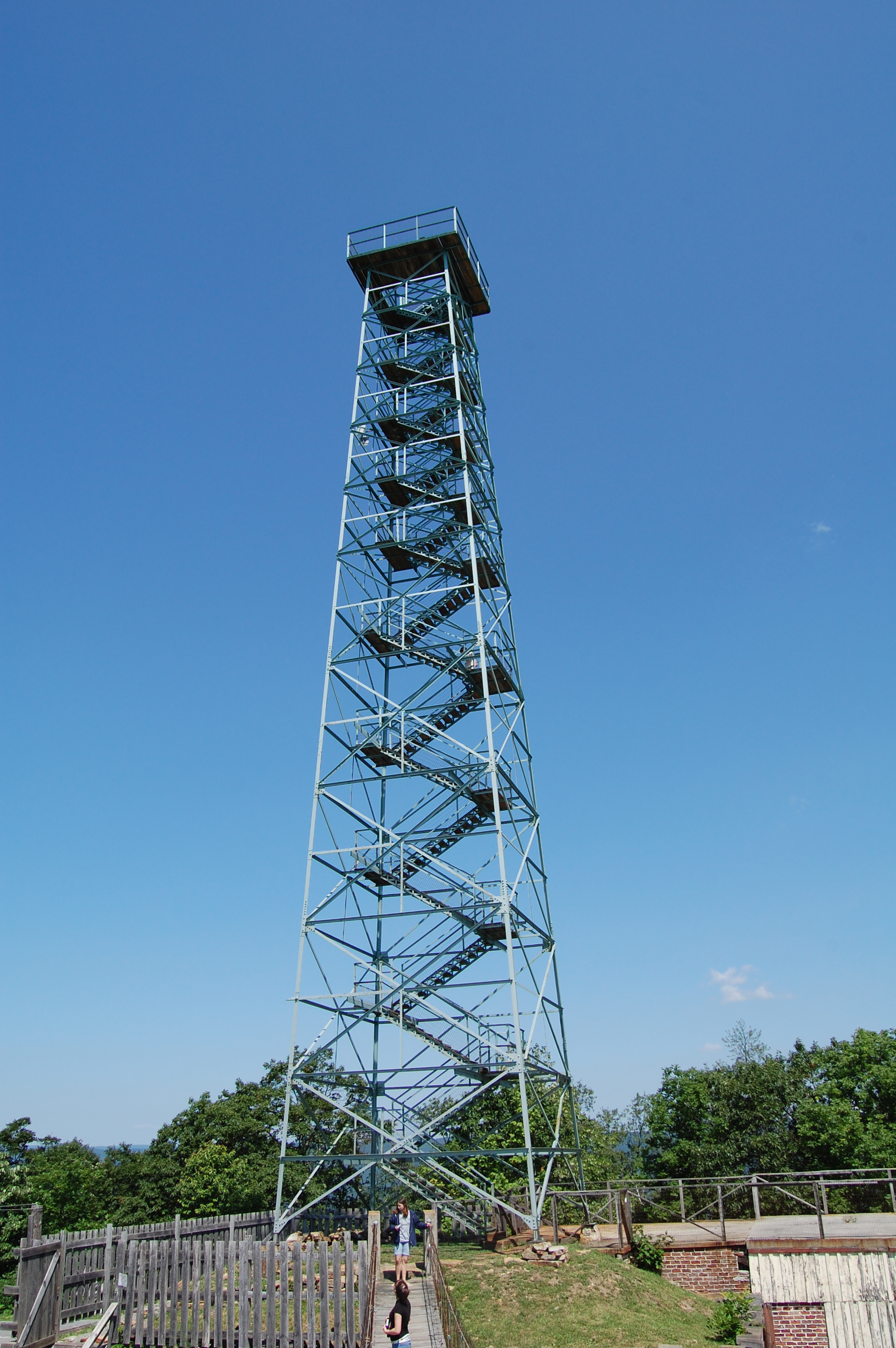
Big Walker Lookout

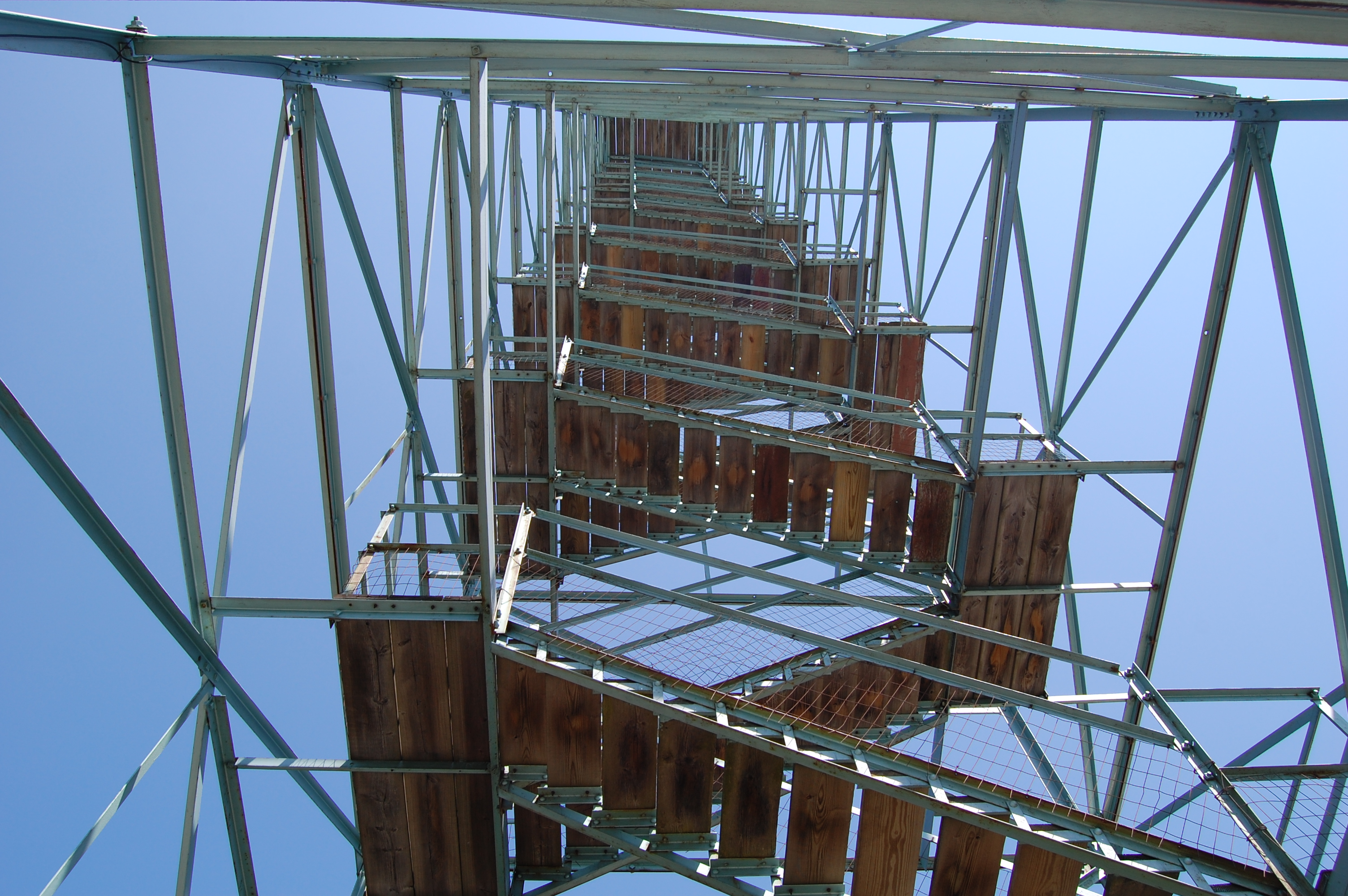
Inside the lookout tower looking up at the stairs from the bottom.

== Location ==
The tower is accessed from the Big Walker General Store, just off US Route 52 about 12 miles (19 km) from Wytheville, Virginia. The first store building burned in 2003 and a new store was built just to the right of the first. Originally, visitors crossed to the tower by way of a swinging bridge that connected to the back of the old general store. The swinging bridge was not destroyed in the fire and still stands. Visitors can cross to the edge where the original staircase connected to the bridge.

Big Walker Lookout hosts traditional arts demonstrations on weekends. The lookout tower is open to the public with payment of an admission fee.

== Views ==
Located at an elevation of 3,405 feet (1,038 m), the view from the top of the tower encompasses mountain peaks in five different states.

== History ==
The tower was originally built in 1947 and has been run continuously by the Kime family. According to the Virginia Department of Tourism, the tower is located at a mountain pass used by Molly Tynes, a woman who warned the town of Wytheville of impending raids by Union Colonel John Toland during the Civil War. The tower is the beginning of a Virginia Civil War Trails driving tour detailing the Battle of Wytheville, which occurred on July 18, 1863, when "a Federal raiding party marched to the Wytheville area intending to destroy the Virginia and Tennessee Railroad tracks and bridges". Troops also hoped to destroy key telegraph lines and damage nearby salt mines and lead mines.

Thanks in part to the warnings brought by Tynes, the battle was largely unsuccessful for the Union forces. "After some skirmishing and confusion on the advance, Union Col. John Toland ordered his men into Wytheville. Hastily organized Confederate resistance succeeded in killing Toland in the street and limiting the damage to the railroad track and stock. The raid did not succeed in its mission as the track was quickly repaired".

== Wildlife ==
Big Walker Lookout Tower is a stop on Virginia Birding and Wildlife Trail's Big Walker Loop.

Birds sighted at the Big Walker Lookout include: wild turkey; black vultures; bald eagles and golden eagles; American kestrels; peregrine falcons; and sharp-shinned, Cooper's hawks, broad-winged, and red-tailed hawks.
