= Rocky Gap, Virginia =

Unincorporated community in Virginia, United States

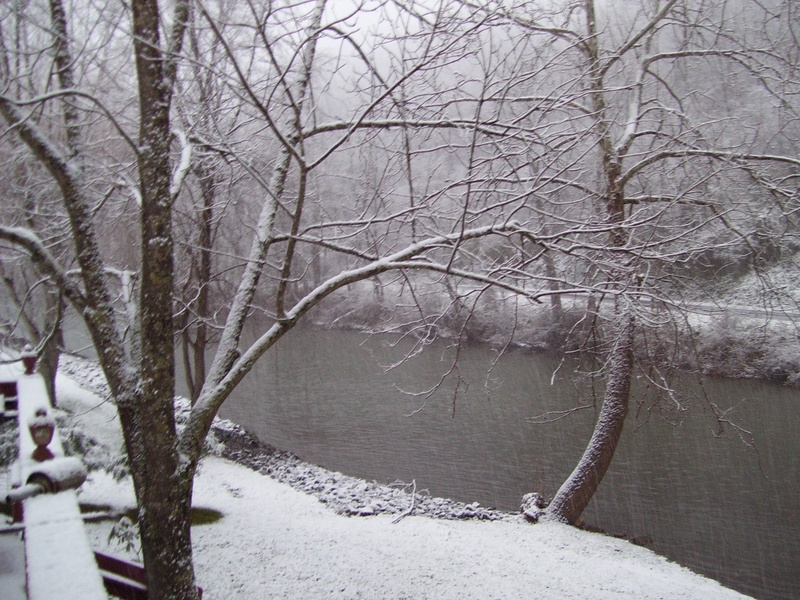
November snow in Rocky Gap

Rocky Gap is an unincorporated community and census designated place (CDP) that is located in Bland County in the U.S. state of Virginia. As of the 2020 census, Rocky Gap had a population of 87. Rocky Gap has one zip code (24366).

The community is connected to neighboring Bluefield, WV by the East River Mountain Tunnel, which carries Interstate 77 beneath East River Mountain. It is in the heart of the Ridge-and-Valley Appalachians.

== Geography ==
Rocky Gap is located along the border with West Virginia, about 8 miles from Bluefield, WV. Rocky Gap has a total area of 4 miles and 95% of it is land the other 5% is water. Although only 5% water, Rocky Gap is somewhat unusual in that the waters of Clear Fork, Laurel Fork and Wolf Creek all converge at nearly the same point less than a hundred yards from each other. This spot where the three waters meet is well known for large trout and has been a favorite spot for many anglers from all over Virginia and West Virginia.

== Demographics ==
Rocky Gap first appeared as a census designated place in the 2020 United States census.

== Nearby cities and towns ==
Here are the nearest cities and towns in order by nearest location.

- Bluefield, West Virginia
- Bluefield, Virginia
- Princeton, West Virginia
- Wytheville, Virginia
