= Bland County, Virginia =

County in Virginia, United States

- County
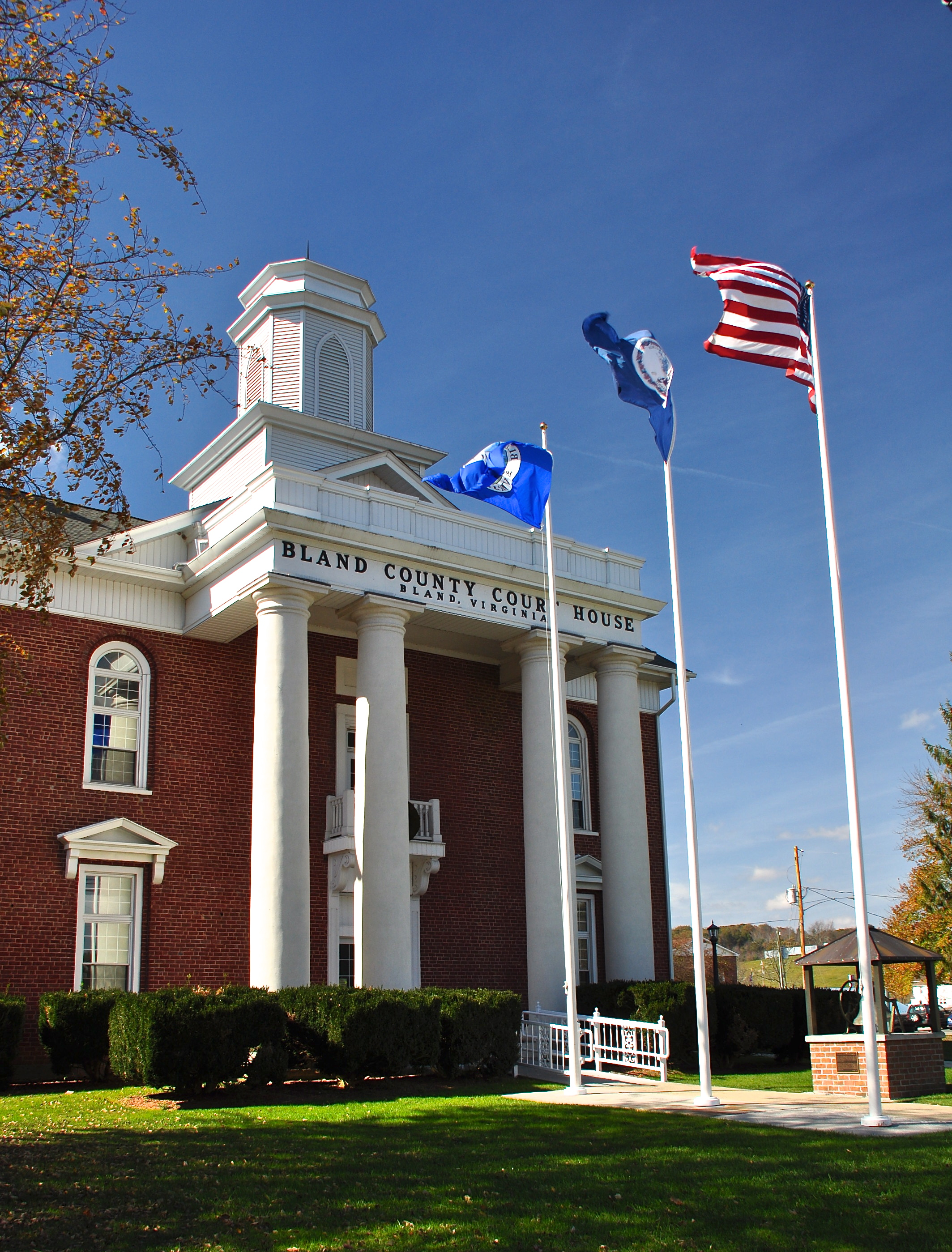
- Bland County Courthouse

- Flag Seal

- Location within the U.S. state of Virginia
- Coordinates: 37°08′N 81°08′W
- Country: United States
- State: Virginia
- Founded: 1861
- Named for: Richard Bland
- Seat: Bland
- Largest community: Bland

Area
  - Total: 359 sq mi (930 km^{2})
  - Land: 358 sq mi (930 km^{2})
  - Water: 1 sq mi (2.6 km^{2}) 0.3%

Population (2020)
  - Total: 6,270
  - Estimate (2025): 6,151 ▼
  - Density: 17.5/sq mi (6.76/km^{2})
- Time zone: UTC−5 (Eastern)
  - Summer (DST): UTC−4 (EDT)
- Congressional district: 9th
- Website: www.blandcountyva.gov

Bland County is a county located in the southwestern portion of the Commonwealth of Virginia. The county seat is the unincorporated area of Bland. At the 2020 census, the population was 6,270.

Bland County was created in 1861 from parts of Wythe, Tazewell, and Giles counties in Virginia. The new county was named in honor of Richard Bland, a Virginia statesman who served in the House of Burgesses and the Continental Congress.

As of the 2020 census, the county population was 6,270, making it the 4th least populated county in Virginia.

== History ==
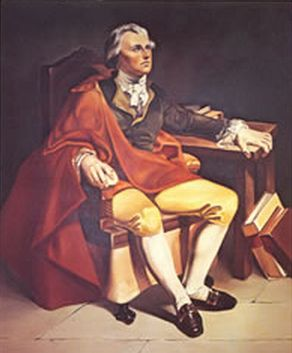
Richard Bland, for whom the county was named

The push to create Bland County resulted from popular dissatisfaction with the distances required to travel to the various county seats in the area. The distances and the difficult mountain trails created a significant hardship for those needing to conduct legal affairs. In addition, the growing population resented paying taxes for benefits outside of the local area. This pressure eventually persuaded the Virginia General Assembly to take action to form a new county in the southwestern portion of the state.

Bland County was officially formed on March 30, 1861, from parts of Wythe, Tazewell, and Giles counties. Additional land from Giles County was added later. The county was named after Richard Bland, a Virginia statesman and political figure who helped lead the struggle for freedom and independence from England.

== Geography ==
According to the U.S. Census Bureau, the county has a total area of 358.7 square miles (929.0 km^{2}), of which 357.7 square miles (926.4 km^{2}) is land and 1.0 square mile (2.6 km^{2}) (0.3%) is water.

Bland County lies within the Appalachian Regional Commission's definition of the Appalachian region. The county is mountainous with small river valleys running through the county. The county lies entirely within the Ridge and Valley physiographic province.

The North Fork of the Holston River has its head waters in Bland County.

=== Adjacent counties ===
- Mercer County, West Virginia – north
- Giles County – northeast
- Pulaski County – southeast
- Wythe County – south
- Smyth County – southwest
- Tazewell County – west

=== National protected area ===
- Jefferson National Forest (part)

=== Major highways ===
- I-74 (future)
- I-77
- US 52
- SR 42
- SR 61
- SR 598

== Demographics ==
Historical population
Census	Pop.	Note	%±
1870	4,000		—
1880	5,004		25.1%
1890	5,129		2.5%
1900	5,497		7.2%
1910	5,154		−6.2%
1920	5,593		8.5%
1930	6,031		7.8%
1940	6,731		11.6%
1950	6,436		−4.4%
1960	5,982		−7.1%
1970	5,423		−9.3%
1980	6,349		17.1%
1990	6,514		2.6%
2000	6,871		5.5%
2010	6,824		−0.7%
2020	6,270		−8.1%
2025 (est.)	6,151	▼	−1.9%
U.S. Decennial Census; 1790–1960 1900–1990; 1990–2000 2010 2020

=== Racial and ethnic composition ===
Bland County, Virginia – Racial and ethnic composition Note: the US Census treats Hispanic/Latino as an ethnic category. This table excludes Latinos from the racial categories and assigns them to a separate category. Hispanics/Latinos may be of any race.
Race / Ethnicity (NH = Non-Hispanic)	Pop 1980	Pop 1990	Pop 2000	Pop 2010	Pop 2020	% 1980	% 1990	% 2000	% 2010	% 2020
White alone (NH)	6,116	6,250	6,495	6,494	5,857	96.33%	95.95%	94.53%	95.16%	93.41%
Black or African American alone (NH)	197	229	285	228	167	3.10%	3.52%	4.15%	3.34%	2.66%
Native American or Alaska Native alone (NH)	10	3	5	1	0	0.16%	0.05%	0.07%	0.01%	0.00%
Asian alone (NH)	1	8	8	18	4	0.02%	0.12%	0.12%	0.26%	0.06%
Native Hawaiian or Pacific Islander alone (NH)	x	x	1	1	0	x	x	0.01%	0.01%	0.00%
Other race alone (NH)	4	0	0	0	5	0.06%	0.00%	0.00%	0.00%	0.08%
Mixed race or Multiracial (NH)	x	x	45	43	177	x	x	0.65%	0.63%	2.82%
Hispanic or Latino (any race)	21	24	32	39	60	0.33%	0.37%	0.47%	0.57%	0.96%
Total	6,349	6,514	6,871	6,824	6,270	100.00%	100.00%	100.00%	100.00%	100.00%

=== 2020 census ===
As of the 2020 census, the county had a population of 6,270. The median age was 48.4 years. 15.0% of residents were under the age of 18 and 23.8% of residents were 65 years of age or older. For every 100 females there were 123.3 males, and for every 100 females age 18 and over there were 127.6 males age 18 and over.

The racial makeup of the county was 93.7% White, 2.7% Black or African American, 0.0% American Indian and Alaska Native, 0.1% Asian, 0.0% Native Hawaiian and Pacific Islander, 0.1% from some other race, and 3.4% from two or more races. Hispanic or Latino residents of any race comprised 1.0% of the population.

0.0% of residents lived in urban areas, while 100.0% lived in rural areas.

There were 2,505 households in the county, of which 23.7% had children under the age of 18 living with them and 23.0% had a female householder with no spouse or partner present. About 29.7% of all households were made up of individuals and 14.8% had someone living alone who was 65 years of age or older.

There were 3,200 housing units, of which 21.7% were vacant. Among occupied housing units, 82.6% were owner-occupied and 17.4% were renter-occupied. The homeowner vacancy rate was 1.8% and the rental vacancy rate was 7.3%.

=== 2000 Census ===
As of the census of 2000, there were 6,871 people, 2,568 households, and 1,908 families residing in the county. The population density was 19 people per square mile (7.3 people/km^{2}). There were 3,161 housing units at an average density of 9 units per square mile (3.5 units/km^{2}). The racial makeup of the county was 94.82% White, 4.19% Black or African American, 0.09% Native American, 0.12% Asian, 0.01% Pacific Islander, 0.09% from other races, and 0.68% from two or more races. 0.47% of the population were Hispanic or Latino of any race. 37.4% were of American, 11.8% German, 11.5% English and 10.9% Irish ancestry according to Census 2000.

There were 2,568 households, out of which 28.30% had children under the age of 18 living with them, 62.40% were married couples living together, 8.70% had a female householder with no husband present, and 25.70% were non-families. 23.30% of all households were made up of individuals, and 10.30% had someone living alone who was 65 years of age or older. The average household size was 2.43 and the average family size was 2.85.

The population distribution of Bland County is: 19.40% under the age of 18, 7.60% from 18 to 24, 30.60% from 25 to 44, 27.90% from 45 to 64, and 14.50% who were 65 years of age or older. The median age was 40 years. For every 100 females there were 119.90 males. For every 100 females aged 18 and over, there were 121.90 males.

The median income for a household in the county was $30,397, and the median income for a family was $35,765. Males had a median income of $30,801 versus $23,380 for females. The per capita income for the county was $17,744. 12.40% of the population and 9.10% of families were below the poverty line. Out of the total people living in poverty, 14.20% are under the age of 18 and 22.60% are 65 or older.

== Government ==
=== Board of Supervisors ===
2022-2024

- District 1: K. Adam Kidd, Chair (R)
- District 2: Stephen Kelley, Vice Chair (R)
- District 3: Randy Johnson, Chair (I)
- District 4: Keith Costello (R)

=== Constitutional officers ===
- Clerk of the Circuit Court: Lisa Hall (R)
- Commissioner of the Revenue: Cindy U. Wright (I)
- Commonwealth's Attorney: Patrick D. White (R)
- Sheriff: Jason Ramsey (R)
- Treasurer: John F. Goins (I)

Bland County is represented by Republican Travis Hackworth in the Virginia Senate, Republican James W. "Will" Morefield in the Virginia House of Delegates, and Republican H. Morgan Griffith in the U.S. House of Representatives.

United States presidential election results for Bland County, Virginia
Year	Republican		Democratic		Third party(ies)	
Year	No.	%	No.	%	No.	%
1912	206	33.50%	289	46.99%	120	19.51%
1916	420	53.85%	356	45.64%	4	0.51%
1920	478	54.26%	403	45.74%	0	0.00%
1924	609	49.96%	604	49.55%	6	0.49%
1928	826	58.96%	575	41.04%	0	0.00%
1932	556	41.00%	783	57.74%	17	1.25%
1936	642	45.05%	778	54.60%	5	0.35%
1940	693	47.83%	753	51.97%	3	0.21%
1944	744	49.40%	762	50.60%	0	0.00%
1948	822	50.49%	738	45.33%	68	4.18%
1952	1,000	57.21%	743	42.51%	5	0.29%
1956	1,113	57.16%	813	41.76%	21	1.08%
1960	848	50.75%	822	49.19%	1	0.06%
1964	717	45.67%	851	54.20%	2	0.13%
1968	938	50.38%	560	30.08%	364	19.55%
1972	1,352	70.64%	527	27.53%	35	1.83%
1976	1,047	51.91%	961	47.65%	9	0.45%
1980	1,278	54.50%	1,002	42.73%	65	2.77%
1984	1,812	67.29%	867	32.19%	14	0.52%
1988	1,556	61.12%	937	36.80%	53	2.08%
1992	1,368	48.31%	1,001	35.35%	463	16.35%
1996	1,167	46.00%	939	37.01%	431	16.99%
2000	1,759	65.44%	851	31.66%	78	2.90%
2004	1,962	68.48%	846	29.53%	57	1.99%
2008	2,031	68.64%	864	29.20%	64	2.16%
2012	2,144	72.73%	735	24.93%	69	2.34%
2016	2,573	81.97%	453	14.43%	113	3.60%
2020	2,903	83.44%	532	15.29%	44	1.26%
2024	2,998	84.33%	524	14.74%	33	0.93%

The county is a historically Republican county. The only Democrats who have carried it since 1910 have been Woodrow Wilson in 1912 when the Republican Party was split between William Howard Taft and Theodore Roosevelt, Franklin D. Roosevelt in each of his four elections, and Lyndon B. Johnson in 1964, all national Democratic Party landslides.

== Education ==
The Bland County Public Schools includes Bland County Elementary School (grades PreK-6) and Bland County High School (grades 7–12).

== Communities ==
=== Census-designated places ===
- Bastian
- Bland
- Mechanicsburg
- Rocky Gap

=== Additional community ===
- Ceres

== See also ==
- National Register of Historic Places listings in Bland County, Virginia
