= Bland, Virginia =

Bland
- Census-designated place (CDP)
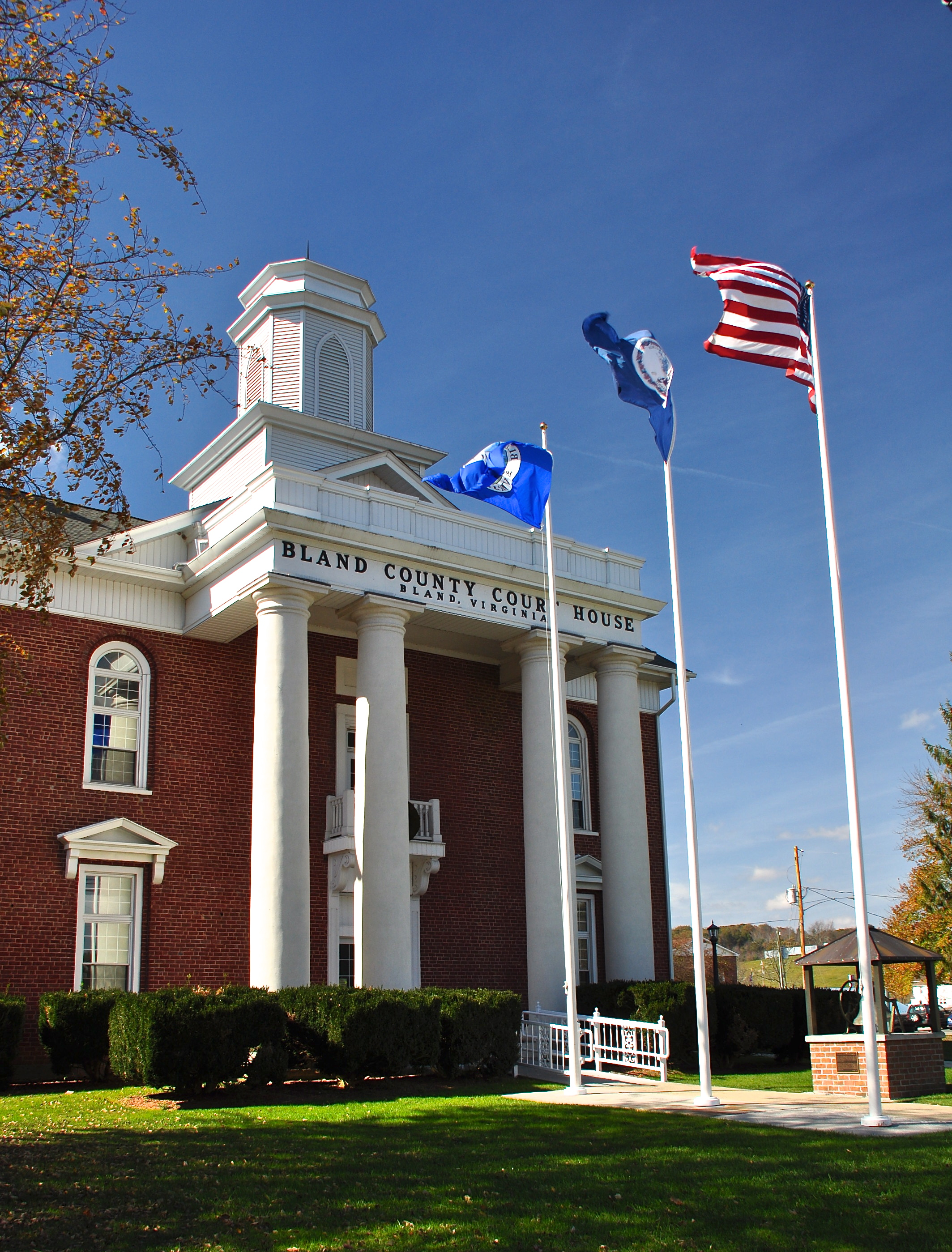
- Bland County Courthouse in Bland

- Location in the Commonwealth of Virginia
- Coordinates: 37°06′07″N 81°06′58″W
- Country: United States
- State: Virginia
- County: Bland
- Elevation: 2,438 ft (743 m)

Population (2020)
  - Total: 383
- Time zone: UTC−5 (EST)
  - Summer (DST): UTC−4 (EDT)
- Zip Code: 24315
- Area Code: 276
- GNIS feature ID: 1498536

Bland is a census-designated place (CDP) in and the county seat of Bland County, Virginia, United States. Bland was originally known as Bland Court House. The population as of the 2020 Census was 383.

== Climate ==
The climate in this area features moderate differences between highs and lows, and there is adequate rainfall year-round. According to the Köppen Climate Classification system, Bland has a marine west coast climate, abbreviated "Cfb" on climate maps.

Climate data for Bland, Virginia (1991–2020)
Month	Jan	Feb	Mar	Apr	May	Jun	Jul	Aug	Sep	Oct	Nov	Dec	Year
Mean daily maximum °F (°C)	42.0 (5.6)	45.4 (7.4)	53.4 (11.9)	63.9 (17.7)	71.9 (22.2)	78.3 (25.7)	81.8 (27.7)	81.0 (27.2)	75.9 (24.4)	66.2 (19.0)	55.2 (12.9)	45.8 (7.7)	63.4 (17.5)
Daily mean °F (°C)	31.5 (−0.3)	34.1 (1.2)	40.8 (4.9)	50.0 (10.0)	58.6 (14.8)	66.0 (18.9)	69.8 (21.0)	68.7 (20.4)	62.8 (17.1)	52.2 (11.2)	41.9 (5.5)	34.9 (1.6)	50.9 (10.5)
Mean daily minimum °F (°C)	21.1 (−6.1)	22.8 (−5.1)	28.2 (−2.1)	36.1 (2.3)	45.2 (7.3)	53.7 (12.1)	57.9 (14.4)	56.4 (13.6)	49.7 (9.8)	38.1 (3.4)	28.7 (−1.8)	24.0 (−4.4)	38.5 (3.6)
Average precipitation inches (mm)	3.45 (88)	3.07 (78)	4.14 (105)	3.87 (98)	4.38 (111)	4.26 (108)	4.01 (102)	3.67 (93)	3.61 (92)	2.75 (70)	2.50 (64)	3.62 (92)	43.33 (1,101)
Average snowfall inches (cm)	8.6 (22)	7.0 (18)	4.2 (11)	0.9 (2.3)	0.0 (0.0)	0.0 (0.0)	0.0 (0.0)	0.0 (0.0)	0.0 (0.0)	0.2 (0.51)	0.6 (1.5)	5.4 (14)	26.9 (69.31)
Source: NOAA

== Demographics ==
Historical population
Census	Pop.	Note	%±
2020	383		—
U.S. Decennial Census; 2010 2020

Bland was first listed as a census designated place in the 2010 U.S. census.

== Notable person ==
- Bob Williams, American football coach
