= Brush Mountain Wilderness =

Protected area in Virginia, United States

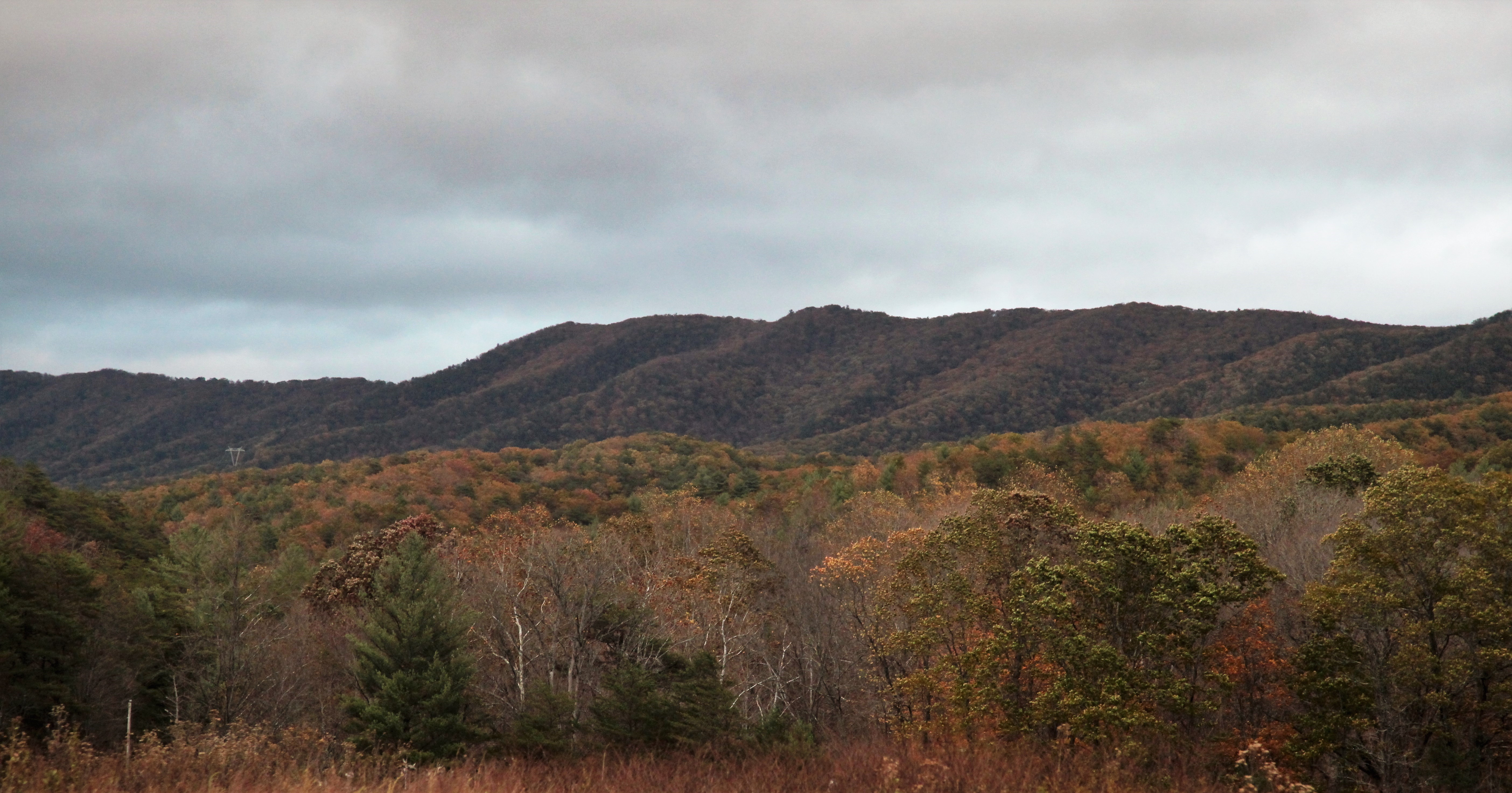
- Brush Mountain looking south near Caldwell Fields

- Location within Virginia
- Location: Virginia, United States
- Coordinates: 37°19′14″N 80°18′40″W
- Area: 4,794 acres (19.40 km^{2})
- Established: 1984
- Operator: George Washington and Jefferson National Forests

The Brush Mountain Wilderness is an area protected by Act of Congress (Eastern Wilderness Act) to maintain its present, natural condition. As part of the wilderness system, it helps to preserve a variety of natural life forms and contributes to a diversity of plant and animal gene pools. The wilderness is adjacent to Brush Mountain East Wilderness.

Although it is located next to the suburbs of Blacksburg, Virginia, Brush Mountain is unexpectedly secluded. The area looks out to the northwest across Craig Creek to the slopes of Sinking Creek Mountain.

The area is part of the Craig Creek Cluster.

== Location and access ==
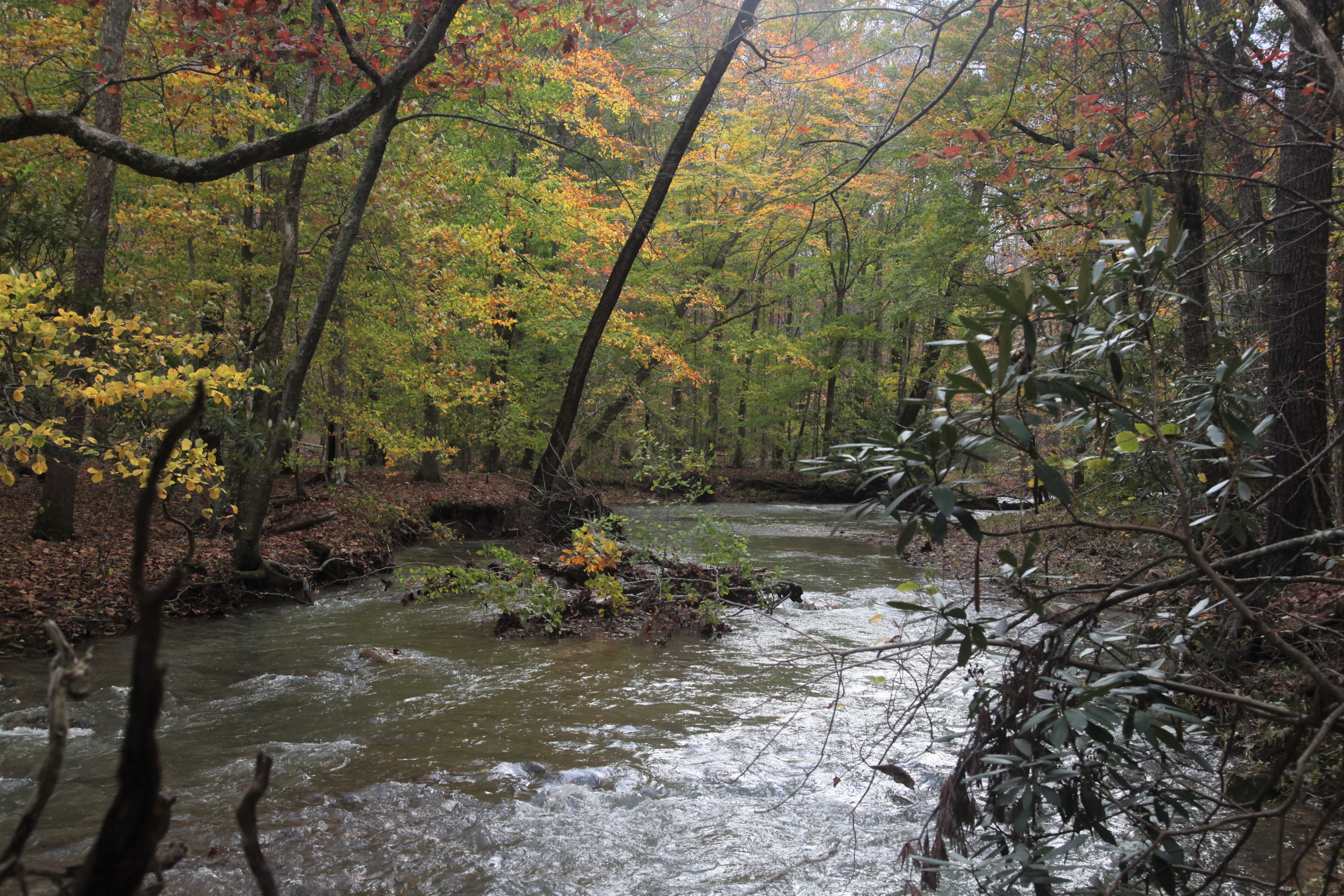
Craig Creek

The wilderness lies north of and in close proximity to Blacksburg, Virginia. It extends for about 8 miles along the northwest slope of Brush Mountain, bounded to the east by a power line, to the northwest by Craig Creek and private property, and to the southeast by Forest road 188.1 along the crest of the mountain. There are no trails in the area.

Boundary of Brush Mountain Wilderness

Good access is gained from Craig Creek Rd. (Va 621) which follows Craig Creek with several pullouts for parking. Access roads are shown on National Geographic-Trails Illustrated Map #787 (Blacksburg-New River Valley).

== Natural history ==
Old-growth oak-pine forests are scattered across the western half of the wilderness. An important species is table mountain pine which thrives in harsh conditions where few other trees will grow. It can be found on the dry southwestern slopes of Brush Mountain. The wilderness area contains some of the highest concentrations of this pine in the world.

Two unusual plants are the parasitic sweet pinesap and piratebush. The only related species of these two plants are found in China and Japan. Sweet pinesap is about 10 cm high, with an erect stalk, lacks chlorophyll, has a light purplish brown color and scalelike leaves. It blooms from September to November or February to April, and is commonly found hidden in leaf litter under oak and pine trees. Piratebush is a shrub growing to 4 meters in height, with groups of 3-10 greenish flowers. It blooms from April to October and is commonly found growing with pines in dry, scrubby woodlands. While piratebush is rare, it sometimes occurs in large populations.

The wilderness protects habitat for the James River spinymussel, an endangered mussel once found throughout much of the entire James River basin from Richmond to the mountains. Now only a few streams, such as Craig Creek, provide good habitat for the mussel. Mussels provide a natural filter to maintain clean water.

== Topography ==
The wilderness is on the northwest side of Brush Mountain, a 2900 foot high ridge with many hollows stretching down from the ridge to Craig Creek. Hollows with names such as Hazelnut Hollow, Sugar Bottom Hollow and Sugar House Hollow probably refer to the natural resources that were gathered in the area. Others such as Betsy Boating Hollow, Jones Hollow, and Leyman Hollow may represent names of families that lived in the area at the end of the nineteenth century.

The wilderness is located a few miles north of the continental divide. The rock strata forming the wilderness are tilted upward to the north. To the south are Mississippian layers, formed between 320 and 360 million years ago. On the upper reaches of the mountain is tough Devonian sandstone, formed between 360 and 408 million years ago. It caps Brush Mountain and juts out to the north at the top of the wilderness slope. Below it lies brittle layers of older and more loose Devonian shale which is subject to erosion. The lower reaches along Craig Creek valley contain Silurian sandstone, formed between 408 and 438 million years ago and extending northwest to form Sinking Creek Mountain.

== Management ==
This wilderness was designated by Congress in 1984 and is managed by the Forest Service. There are some regulations to maintain the integrity of the area. For example, motorized equipment, motor vehicles and mountain bikes are prohibited, group size is limited to ten people, and limits are placed on camping.

== Nearby wild areas ==
- Patterson Mountain
- Broad Run (conservation area)
- Spesard Knob
- Price Mountain (conservation area)
- Stone Coal Creek (conservation area)
- North Mountain (conservation area)
- Sinking Creek Mountain
- Johns Creek Mountain

== See also ==
- Wilderness
- Eastern Wilderness Act
- Craig Creek Cluster
