= Stone Coal Creek (conservation area) =

Protected natural area in Virginia, United States

- Location within Virginia
- Location: Botetourt County, Virginia, United States
- Coordinates: 37°29′33″N 80°1′1″W
- Area: 2,844 acres (11.51 km^{2})
- Administrator: U.S. Forest Service

Stone Coal Creek, a wildland in the George Washington and Jefferson National Forests of western Virginia, has been recognized by the Wilderness Society as a special place worthy of protection from logging and road construction. The Wilderness Society has designated the area as a "Mountain Treasure".

From a seldom-visited trail, there are views across the Great Valley of Virginia toward Purgatory Mountain and Peaks of Otter to the east, and Spesard Knob and Sinking Creek Mountain to the north.

The area is part of the Craig Creek Cluster.

== Location and access ==
The area is located in the Appalachian Mountains of Southwestern Virginia, about 5 miles east of New Castle, Virginia. State Route Va 618 passes along the western side of the area, and Va 748 on the northeast. A powerline separates the area from the North Mountain wild area on the south, and Va 748 separates the area from Broad Run wild area on the north and west .

The North Mountain Trail, Forest Trail 263, runs through the area along the ridge of North Mountain.

The area can be accessed from US Forest Service Road 183 which passes along the north and western edge of the area.

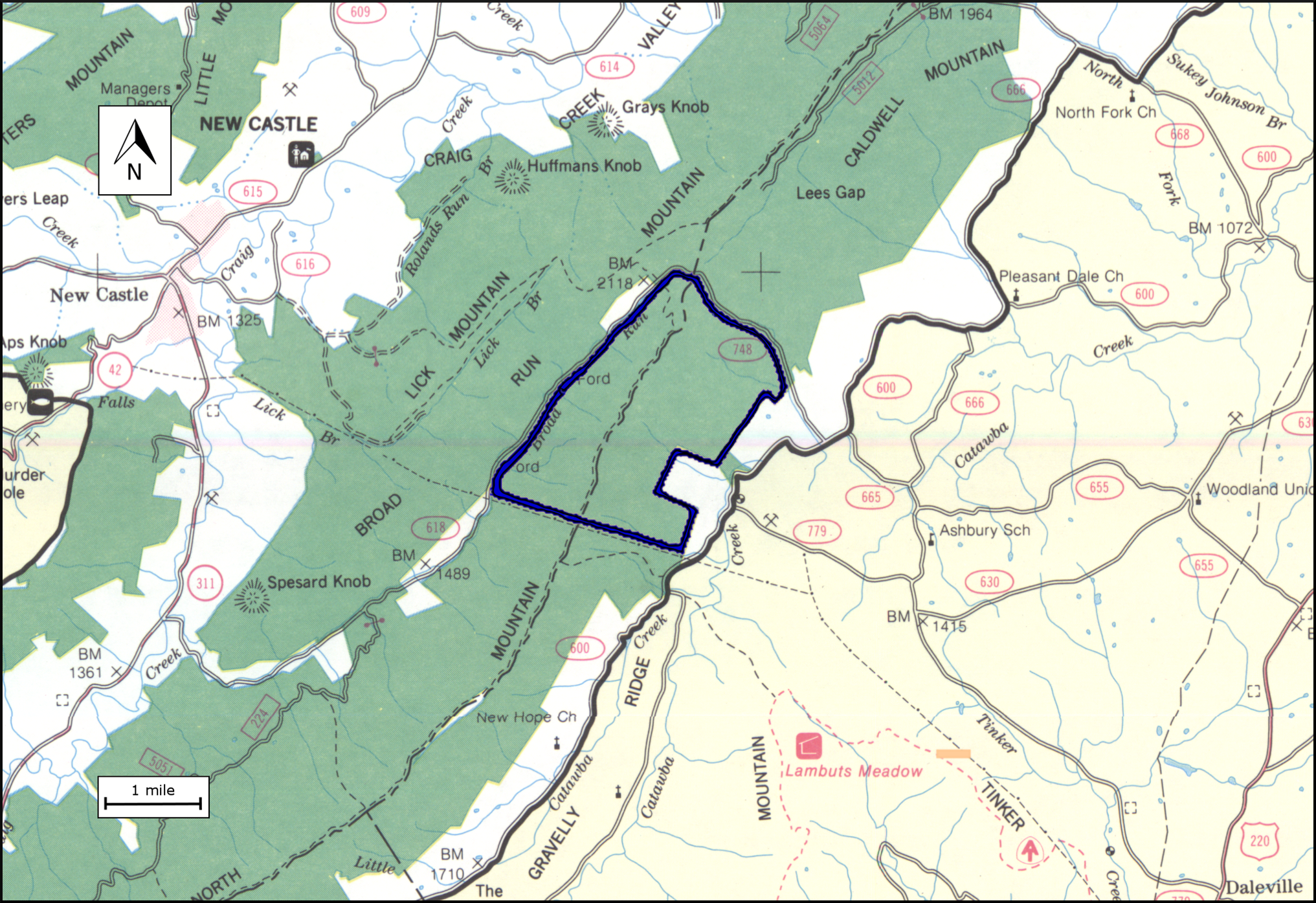
Boundary of the Stone Coal Creek wildland as identified by the Wilderness Society

The boundary of the wildland, as determined by the Wilderness Society, is shown in the adjacent map. Additional roads in the vicinity are given on National Geographic Maps 788 (Covington, Alleghany Highlands). A great variety of information, including topographic maps, aerial views, satellite data and weather information, is obtained by selecting the link with the wild land's coordinates in the upper right of this page.

Beyond maintained trails, old logging roads can be used to explore the area. The Appalachian Mountains were extensively timbered in the early twentieth century leaving logging roads that are becoming overgrown but still passable. Old logging roads and railroad grades can be located by consulting the historical topographic maps available from the United States Geological Survey (USGS). The Stone Coal Creek wild area is covered by USGS topographic maps Catawba, New Castle, and Daleville.

== Natural history ==
The area is within the Ridge and Valley Subsection of the Northern Ridge and Valley Section in the Central Appalachian Broadleaf Coniferous Forest-Meadow Province. It forms an important wildlife corridor between the Broad Run wild area to the north and North Mountain wild area on the southeast.

The area contains a few stands of old-growth trees.

== Topography ==
The area covers both sides of the ridge forming North Mountain. Stone Coal Creek, on the northern border of the area, drains the eastern slopes of North Mountain and Broad Run Mountain. A tributary of Catwba Creek, Stone Coal Creek flows parallel to Va 748 to join Catawba Creek where Va 748 ends at Va 600. Catawba Creek flows north to join the James River.

Sinkholes on the north side of the area are evidence for the possibility of Karst soils.

== Forest Service management ==
The Forest Service has conducted a survey of their lands to determine the potential for wilderness designation. Wilderness designation provides a high degree of protection from development. The areas that were found suitable are referred to as inventoried roadless areas. Later a Roadless Rule was adopted that limited road construction in these areas. The rule provided some degree of protection by reducing the negative environmental impact of road construction and thus promoting the conservation of roadless areas. Stone Coal Creek was not inventoried in the roadless area review, and therefore not protected from possible road construction and timber sales.

The forest service classifies areas under their management by a recreational opportunity setting that informs visitors of the diverse range of opportunities available in the forest. Most of the area is designated "Backcountry-Non Motorized". Along Broad Ruin on the northwest there are areas designated "Early successional Habitat", and on the southeastern side there are areas designated "Dispersed Recreation Area—Suitable for Timber Production".

== See also ==
- Craig Creek Cluster
