= Bắc Sơn (disambiguation) =

Bắc Sơn may refer to:

== Places in Vietnam ==
- Bắc Sơn district, a rural district of Lạng Sơn Province
- Bắc Sơn, Kiến An, a ward of Kiến An District in Haiphong city
- Bắc Sơn, Ninh Bình, a ward of Tam Điệp city
- Bắc Sơn, Uông Bí, a ward of Uông Bí city in Quảng Ninh Province
- Bắc Sơn, Sầm Sơn, a ward of Sầm Sơn city in Thanh Hóa Province
- Bắc Sơn, Thái Nguyên, a ward of Phổ Yên town
- Bắc Sơn, Bỉm Sơn, a ward of Bỉm Sơn town in Thanh Hóa Province
- Bắc Sơn (township), a township and capital of Bắc Sơn District
- Bắc Sơn, Hanoi, a rural commune of Sóc Sơn District
- Bắc Sơn, An Dương, a rural commune of An Dương District
- Bắc Sơn, Móng Cái, a rural commune of Móng Cái city in Quảng Ninh Province
- Bắc Sơn, Đồng Nai, a rural commune of Trảng Bom District
- Bắc Sơn, Hưng Yên, a rural commune of Ân Thi District
- Bắc Sơn, Đô Lương, a rural commune of Đô Lương District in Nghệ An Province
- Bắc Sơn, Quỳ Hợp, a rural commune of Quỳ Hợp District in Nghệ An Province
- Bắc Sơn, Ninh Thuận, a rural commune of Thuận Bắc District
- Bắc Sơn, Phú Thọ, a rural commune of Tam Nông District
- Bắc Sơn, Thái Bình, a rural commune of Hưng Hà District

== Other uses ==
- Bắc Sơn culture
- "Bắc Sơn", a song written by Văn Cao

== See also ==
- 北山 (disambiguation)
