= Brush Mountain East Wilderness =

Protected area in Virginia, US

- IUCN category Ib (wilderness area)
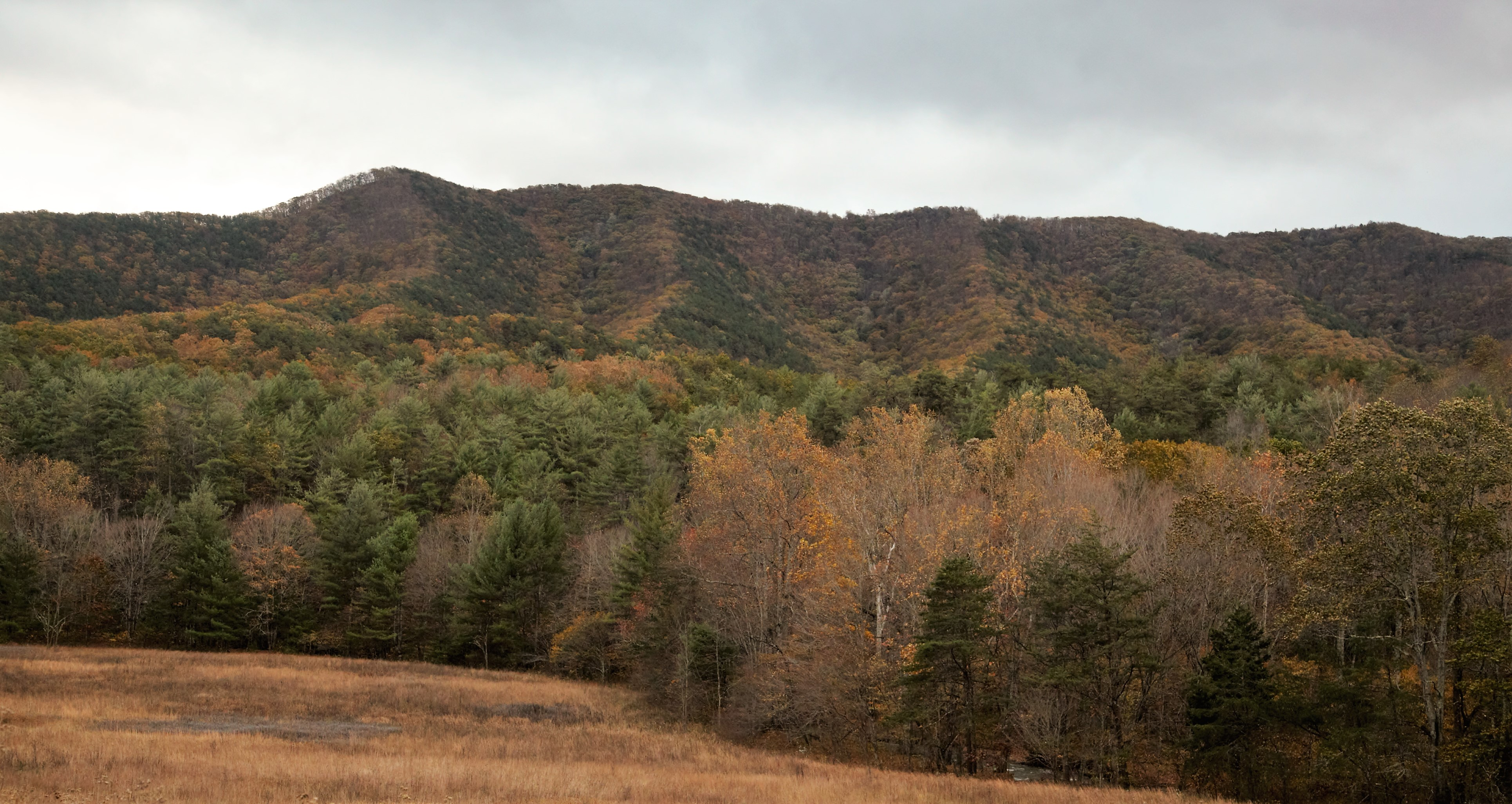
- Brush Mountain

- Location within Virginia
- Location: Virginia, U.S.
- Nearest city: McDonalds Mill, Virginia
- Coordinates: 37.32700°N 80.32200°W
- Area: 3,745 acres (15.16 km^{2})
- Established: 2009
- Administrator: U.S. Forest Service

Brush Mountain East Wilderness is a U.S. wilderness area in the Eastern Divide Ranger District of the George Washington and Jefferson National Forests. It was designated as wilderness area in 2009 by Omnibus Public Land Management Act of 2009. The wilderness is adjacent to Brush Mountain Wilderness.

Traversed by the Appalachian Trail, the wilderness is rugged and steep with contrasting habitats containing dry table mountain pine on the southwest ridges and sugar maples, white oaks, and hemlock in wetter drainages. Small tracts of old-growth forest support bird species dependent on mature, deciduous forests for breeding.

The area is part of the Craig Creek Cluster.

== Location and Access ==
The wilderness is about 8 miles southwest of New Castle, Virginia and extends into Craig, Roanoke, and Montgomery Counties. It is bounded on the northwest by VA 621, on the northeast by VA 620, on the southeast by FS Road 11060, and a powerline on the south.

Boundary of Brush Mountain East Wilderness

The Appalachian Trail travels for 7.5 miles through the wilderness from the northern trailhead on VA 620 to the southern trailhead on VA 621. Many old access and logging roads, offering additional access to the area, have become overgrown, but others are kept open by hikers and hunters. An older part of the Appalachian Trail, now abandoned, stretches a few miles along the midslope of Brush Mountain.

== Natural history ==
The wilderness contains colluvial drainages, toeslopes and alluvial floodplains providing a rich environment that supports yellow poplar, northern red oak, white oak, basswood, cucumber tree, white ash, eastern hemlock, white pine and red maple. In the remaining land, white oak, northern red oak, and hickory are found to the north and west while chestnut oak, scarlet oak and yellow pine are found on ridgetops and slopes to the east and south. The area is one of the few sites in Virginia with table mountain pine and box huckleberry, species requiring fire to reproduce, and therefore becoming uncommon because of fire exclusion.

The 20-acre Brush Mountain Special Biological Area is located on the crest of the mountain. The wilderness also contains the Central Appalachian shale barrens which support rare plant species such as the Virginia white-haired leatherflower and other unique rare species of plants and butterflies.

The forest type found in the wilderness is a habitat for songbirds such as cerulean warblers, Swainson’s warblers, black-throated green warblers, and winter wrens.

== Topography ==
The area is part of the Ridge and Valley Subsection of the Northern Ridge and Valley Section with the Central Appalachian Broadleaf-Coniferous Forest-Meadow Province. This section is marked by ridges oriented along the northeast/southwest and composed of sandstone and shale. Wide valleys between the ridges are composed of limestone and shale. The drainage density is high with many tributaries feeding into Craig Creek on the north and Trout Creek on the east and south.

Craig Creek, part of the James River watershed, was once part of the New River watershed before being captured by the James River.

Elevations range from 1520 feet along Craig Creek to 3070 feet at the crest of Brush Mountain.

== Cultural History ==
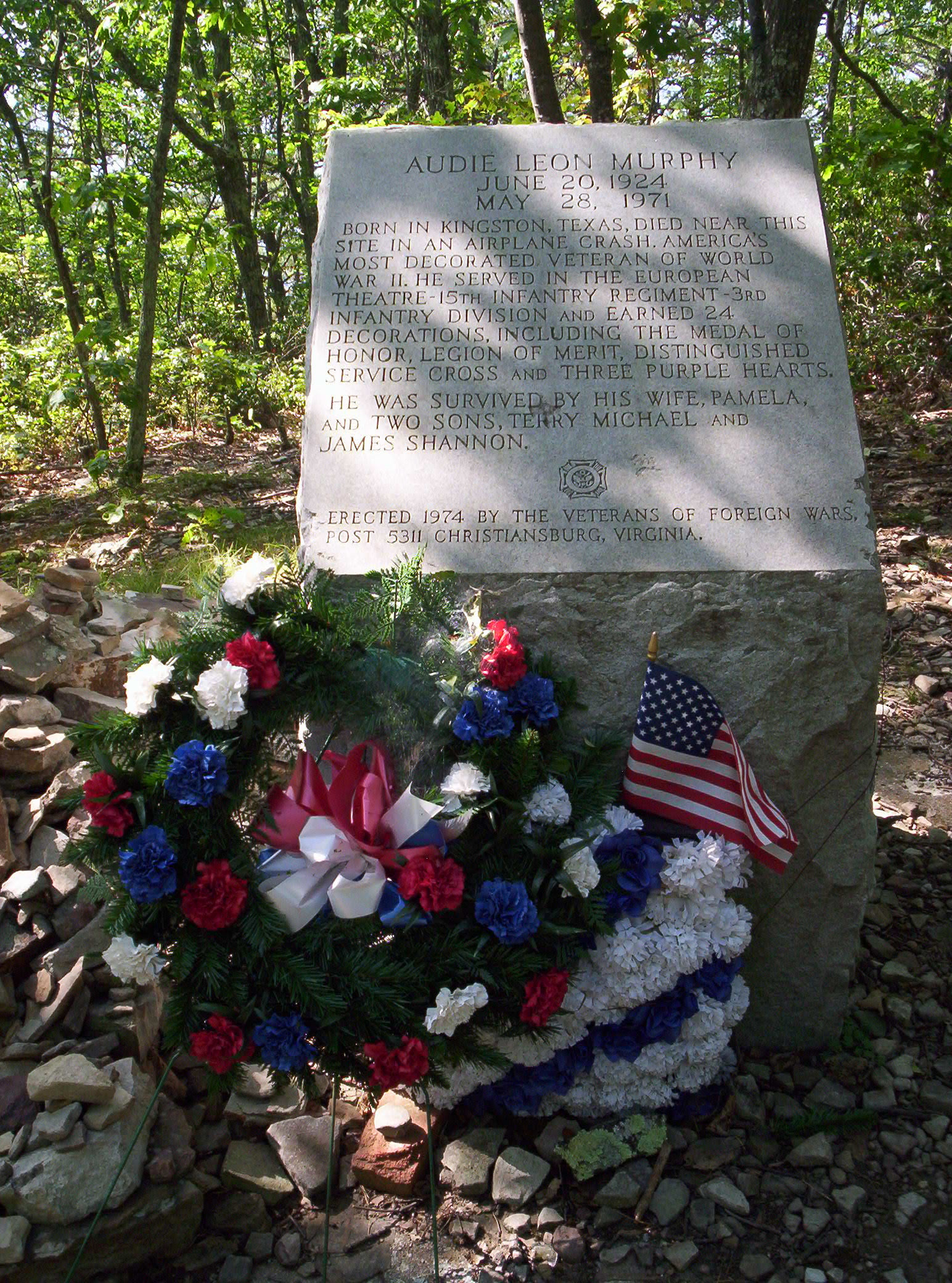
Monument at the site of the plane crash in which Audie Murphy was killed

Audie Murphy, a 2nd world war hero, died in a plane crash on Brush Mountain in 1971. The crash site, near the Appalachian Trail on the crest of Brush Mountain, is marked by a stone monument erected by the Veterans of Foreign Wars.

== Management ==
The wilderness is managed by the Forest Service. There are some regulations to maintain the integrity of the area as a wilderness. For example, motorized equipment, motor vehicles, and mountain bikes are prohibited, group size is limited to ten people, and limits are placed on camping.

== See also ==
- List of U.S. Wilderness Areas
- Craig Creek Cluster
