= North Mountain =

North Mountain may refer to:

== Geography ==
=== Mountains ===
- North Mountain (Catskills) in New York, US
- North Mountain (Virginia-West Virginia), US
- North Mountain (Nova Scotia), Canada
- North Mountain (Pennsylvania), US

=== Other places ===
- North Mountain (conservation area), a wildland in western Virginia, US
- North Mountain, West Virginia, US, an unincorporated community

== Other uses ==
- North Mountain (film), a 2015 film

== See also ==
- Great North Mountain in Virginia and West Virginia
- North Fork Mountain in West Virginia
- Northmount, Alberta; neighbourhood
- Northmont, Ohio; schools
- Mountain (disambiguation)
- North (disambiguation)
- 北山
