= Johns Creek Mountain =

Protected natural area in Virginia, United States

- Location within Virginia
- Location: Craig County; Virginia, United States
- Nearest town: New Castle, Virginia
- Coordinates: 37°29′20″N 80°11′25″W
- Area: 6,323 acres (25.59 km^{2})
- Administrator: U.S. Forest Service

Johns Creek Mountain, a wildland in the George Washington and Jefferson National Forests of western Virginia, has been recognized by the Wilderness Society as a special place worthy of protection from logging and road construction. The Wilderness Society has designated the area as a "Mountain Treasure".

Beginning at a knob overlooking New Castle, Virginia, the ridge of Johns Creek Mountain continues southwest for twelve miles undulating between 2900 and 3,000 feet in elevation. Several trails give access to the area.

The area is part of the Sinking Creek Valley Cluster.

== Location and access ==
The area is located in the Appalachian Mountains of Southwestern Virginia, about 2 miles southwest of New Castle, Virginia. Cumberland Gap Road, Va 42, is on the southeast side of the area, and Johns Creek Road, Va 658, is on the northwest. Tub Run Road, Forest Road 257, follows along the northwestern border. There are no official trails in the area. The Caldwell Trail is no longer listed in the Forest Service database, however there are many unmaintained trails leading to the ridgeline.

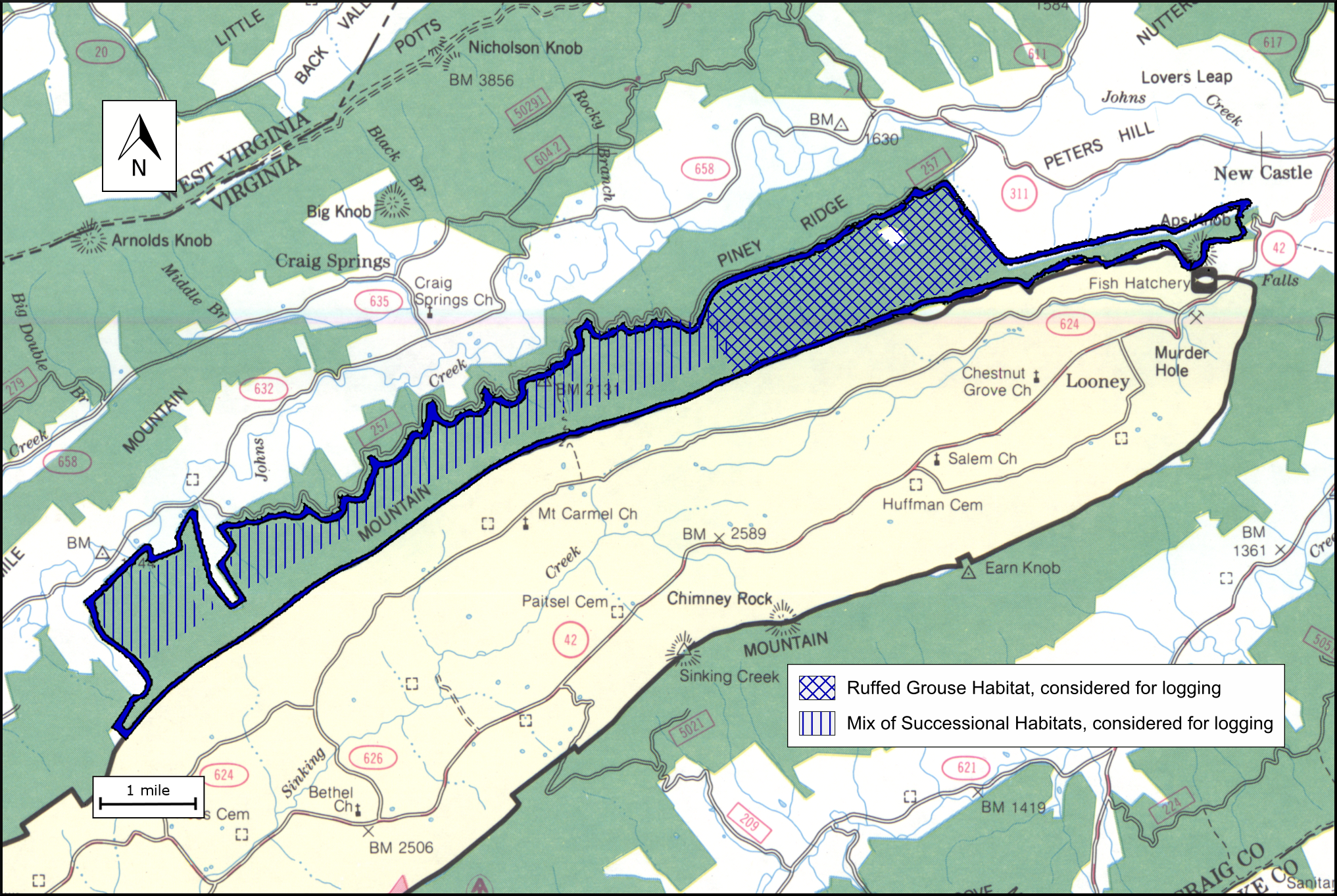
Boundary of the Johns Creek Mountain wild area as identified by the Wilderness Society

The boundary of the wildland, as determined by the Wilderness Society, is shown in the adjacent map. Roads in the area can be found on National Geographic Map 788 (Covington, Alleghany Highlands). A great variety of information, including topographic maps, aerial views, satellite data and weather information, is obtained by selecting the link with the wild land's coordinates in the upper right of this page.

Beyond maintained trails, old logging roads can be used to explore the area. The Appalachian Mountains were extensively timbered in the early twentieth century leaving logging roads that are becoming overgrown but still passable. Old logging roads and railroad grades can be located by consulting the historical topographic maps available from the United States Geological Survey (USGS). The Johns Creek Mountain wild area is covered by USGS topographic maps Looney, Potts Creek and Craig Springs.

== Natural history ==
The area is within the Ridge and Valley Subsection of the Northern Ridge and Valley Section in the Central Appalachian Broadleaf Coniferous Forest-Meadow Province. The ridgeline contains white oak, northern red oak, chestnut oak, basswood and hickory with a quality similar to an old-growth forest.

== Topography ==
The area is dominated by Johns Creek Mountain, a long ridge, about 2900 feet high, forming the southeastern border of the area. The area drains into Johns Creek which flows north to join Craig Creek near New Castle. Johns Creek is a calm, smooth running stream until it nears New Castle where it plunges through a gorge with class 4-5 rapids, presenting a difficult challenge for paddlers.

== Forest Service management ==
The Forest Service has conducted a survey of their lands to determine the potential for wilderness designation. Wilderness designation provides a high degree of protection from development. The areas that were found suitable are referred to as inventoried roadless areas. Later a Roadless Rule was adopted that limited road construction in these areas. The rule provides some degree of protection by reducing the negative environmental impact of road construction and thus promoting the conservation of roadless areas. Johns Creek Mountain was not inventoried in the roadless area review, and therefore not protected from possible road construction and timber sales.

The forest service classifies areas under their management by a recreational opportunity setting that informs visitors of the diverse range of opportunities available in the forest. Much of the ridgeline has been assigned "Old Growth with Disturbance", the eastern side has an area designated "Ruffed Grouse Habitat", the western side has a "Mix of Successional Habitats", there is a "Scenic Corridor" next to Rt 311 and a small tract near New Castle, which may be traded for other lands, is designated "Small Tract-Custodial".

A large section of the area has been logged recently, and there is a possibility of future timber sales in the "Ruffed Grouse Habitat" and "Mix of Successional Habitats" areas. There is a network of 5.66 miles of Forest Service logging road not open for public motor use.

== See also ==
- Sinking Creek Valley Cluster
