= Price Mountain (conservation area) =

Protected natural area in Virginia, United States

- Location within Virginia
- Location: Craig County; Botetourt County; Virginia, United States
- Coordinates: 37°34′3″N 79°56′46″W
- Area: 9,121 acres (36.91 km^{2})
- Administrator: U.S. Forest Service

Price Mountain, a wildland in the George Washington and Jefferson National Forests of western Virginia, has been recognized by the Wilderness Society as a special place worthy of protection from logging and road construction. The Wilderness Society has designated the area as a "Mountain Treasure".

With a network of trails far from human activities, the area offers an opportunity for solitude and backcountry recreation.

The area is part of the Craig Creek Cluster.

== Location and access ==
The area is located in the Appalachian Mountains of Southwestern Virginia, about 11 miles northeast of New Castle, Virginia. It is bounded by Forest road 184 on the north and west, and VA 606 on the south.

Trails into the area include:

- Price Mountain Trail, 10.6 miles
- Sulphur Ridge Trail, Forest Trail 149, 2.8 miles
- Kelly Trail, 1.3 miles

Kelley Hollow Rd., Rt. 267, gives access to the area.

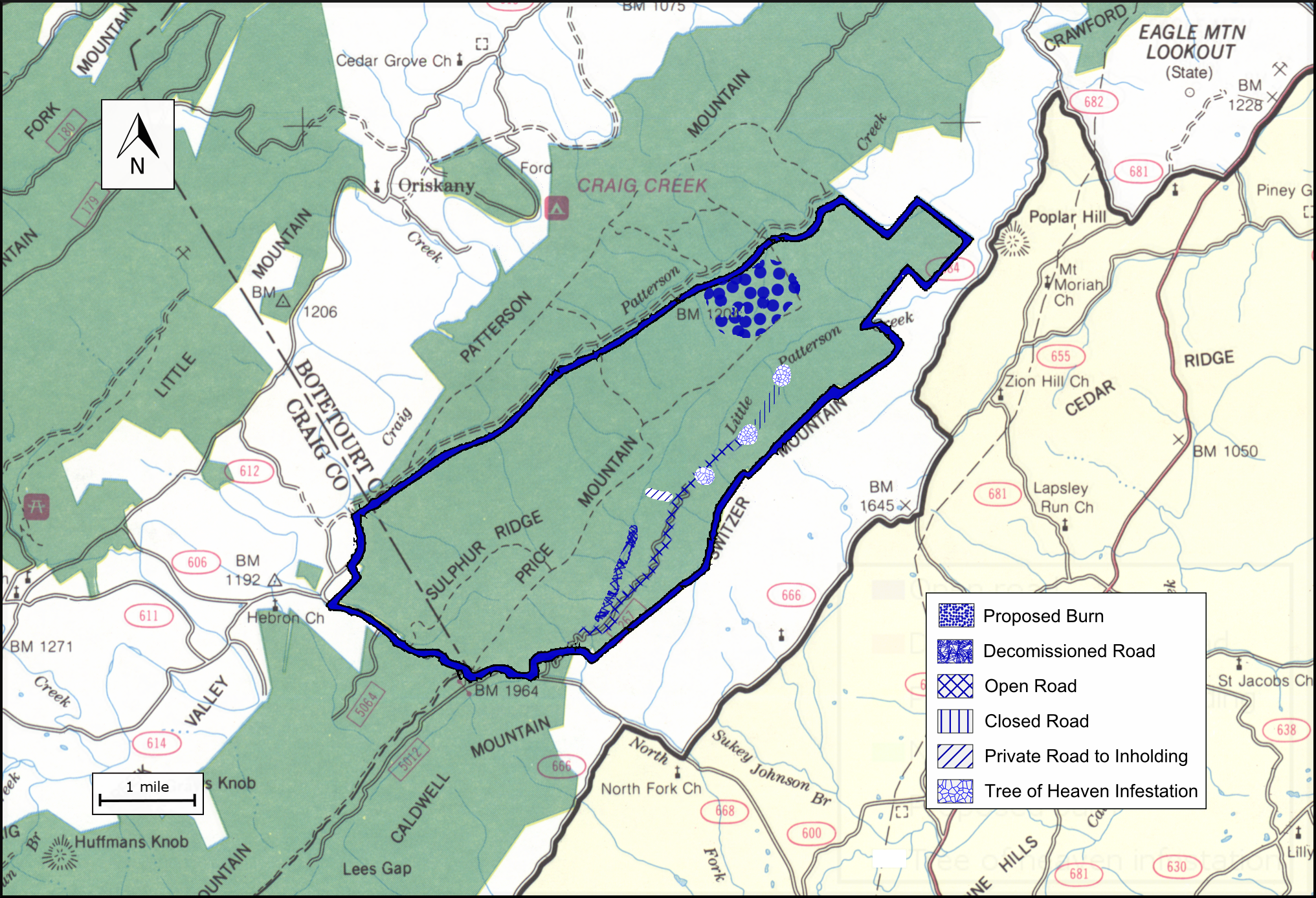
Boundary of the Price Mountain wildland as identified by the Wilderness Society

The boundary of the wildland, as determined by the Wilderness Society, is shown in the adjacent map. Additional roads and trails are given on National Geographic Maps 788 (Covington, Alleghany Highlands). A great variety of information, including topographic maps, aerial views, satellite data and weather information, is obtained by selecting the link with the wild land's coordinates in the upper right of this page.

Beyond maintained trails, old logging roads can be used to explore the area. The Appalachian Mountains were extensively timbered in the early twentieth century leaving logging roads that are becoming overgrown but still passable. Old logging roads and railroad grades can be located by consulting the historical topographic maps available from the United States Geological Survey (USGS). The Price Mountain wild area is covered by USGS topographic maps Oriskany and Salisbury.

== Natural history ==
The area is within the Ridge and Valley Subsection of the Northern Ridge and Valley Section in the Central Appalachian Broadleaf Coniferous Forest-Meadow Province. Yellow poplar, northern red oak, white oak, basswood, cucumber tree, white ash, eastern hemlock and red maple are found in colluvial drainages, toeslopes and along flood plains of small to medium-sized streams. White oak, northern red oak, and hickory dominate on the north and west, while chestnut oak, scarlet oak and yellow pine are found on ridgetops and exposed sites. The area includes the Patterson Creek Barren special biological area as well as part of the County Line Barrens special biological area near the junction of Little Patterson Creek and Craig Creek.

The Virginia white-haired leatherflower has been found in the area.

A non-native species, the Tree of Heaven, found along sections of Kelley Road, has been targeted for herbicide treatment.

There are about 335 acres of old growth forest in the area.

== Topography ==
The area is distinguished by ridges that trend northeast–southwest. The ridges, composed of sandstone or shale, have parallel drainages flowing into broad limestone valleys. Price Mountain is typical with small steep sideslope drainages. From a 2720-foot peak along the crest of Price Mountain, the elevation dips to 1091 feet at the northern tip of the area.

Silurian-aged sandstone underlays about 75 percent of the area, with the remaining area underlain by Brallier and Martinsburg shale.

== Forest Service management ==
The Forest Service has conducted a survey of their lands to determine the potential for wilderness designation. Wilderness designation provides a high degree of protection from development. The areas that were found suitable are referred to as inventoried roadless areas. Later a Roadless Rule was adopted that limited road construction in these areas. The rule provided some degree of protection by reducing the negative environmental impact of road construction and thus promoting the conservation of roadless areas. Price Mountain was inventoried in the roadless area review, and therefore protected from possible road construction and timber sales.

A road providing access to a private inholding near the top of Kelly Hollow Creek ran close to Kelly Hollow Creek creating an erosion hazard. In 2007 the Forest Service decided to decommission the road and replace it with a shorter, parallel road.

The forest service classifies areas under their management by a recreational opportunity setting that informs visitors of the diverse range of opportunities available in the forest. Most of the area is designated "Backcountry—Non-Motorized". The northeast part of Patterson Creek is designated "Mix of Successional Habitats", and there is a section on the southern side designated "Dispersed Recreation Area-Suitable for Timber Production".

== Cultural history ==
A 1998 survey of 327 acres of the area found five transient camps.

== See also ==
- Craig Creek Cluster
