= Craig Creek Cluster =

Protected natural area in Virginia, United States

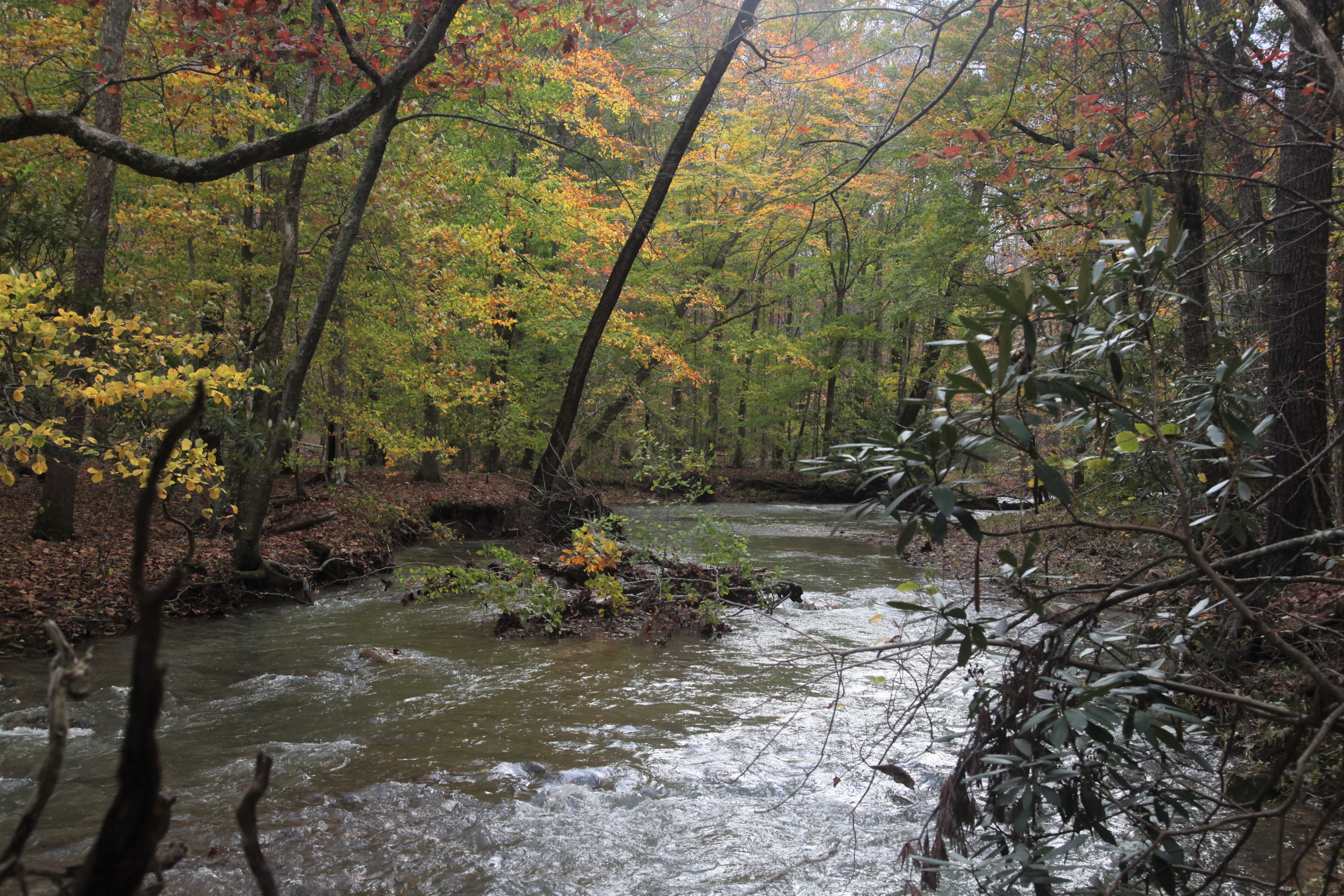
- Craig Creek

- Location within Virginia
- Location: Botetourt County; Craig County; Virginia, United States
- Coordinates: 37°29′33″N 80°1′1″W
- Administrator: U.S. Forest Service

The Craig Creek Cluster is a region recognized by The Wilderness Society for its unique high elevation mountains, vistas, trout streams and wildlife habitat. The cluster contains wildlands and wilderness areas along Craig Creek, a 65-mile long creek with headwaters at the Brush Mountain Wilderness near Blacksburg.

Popular for hiking, canoeing, mountain biking, hunting, horseback riding, and fishing, the area offers an opportunity for secluded recreation. During the summer months, the area is an escape from other public lands that are busy with visitors.

== Description ==
The Craig Creek Wilderness Cluster contains wilderness areas and wildlands recognized by the Wilderness Society as "Mountain Treasures", areas that are worthy of protection from logging and road construction.

The areas in the cluster are:

- Wilderness Areas
  - Brush Mountain Wilderness
  - Brush Mountain East Wilderness
- Wildareas recognized by the Wilderness Society as “Mountain Treasures”
  - Patterson Mountain
  - Broad Run (conservation area)
  - Spesard Knob
  - Price Mountain (conservation area)
  - Stone Coal Creek (conservation area)
  - North Mountain (conservation area)

== Location and access ==
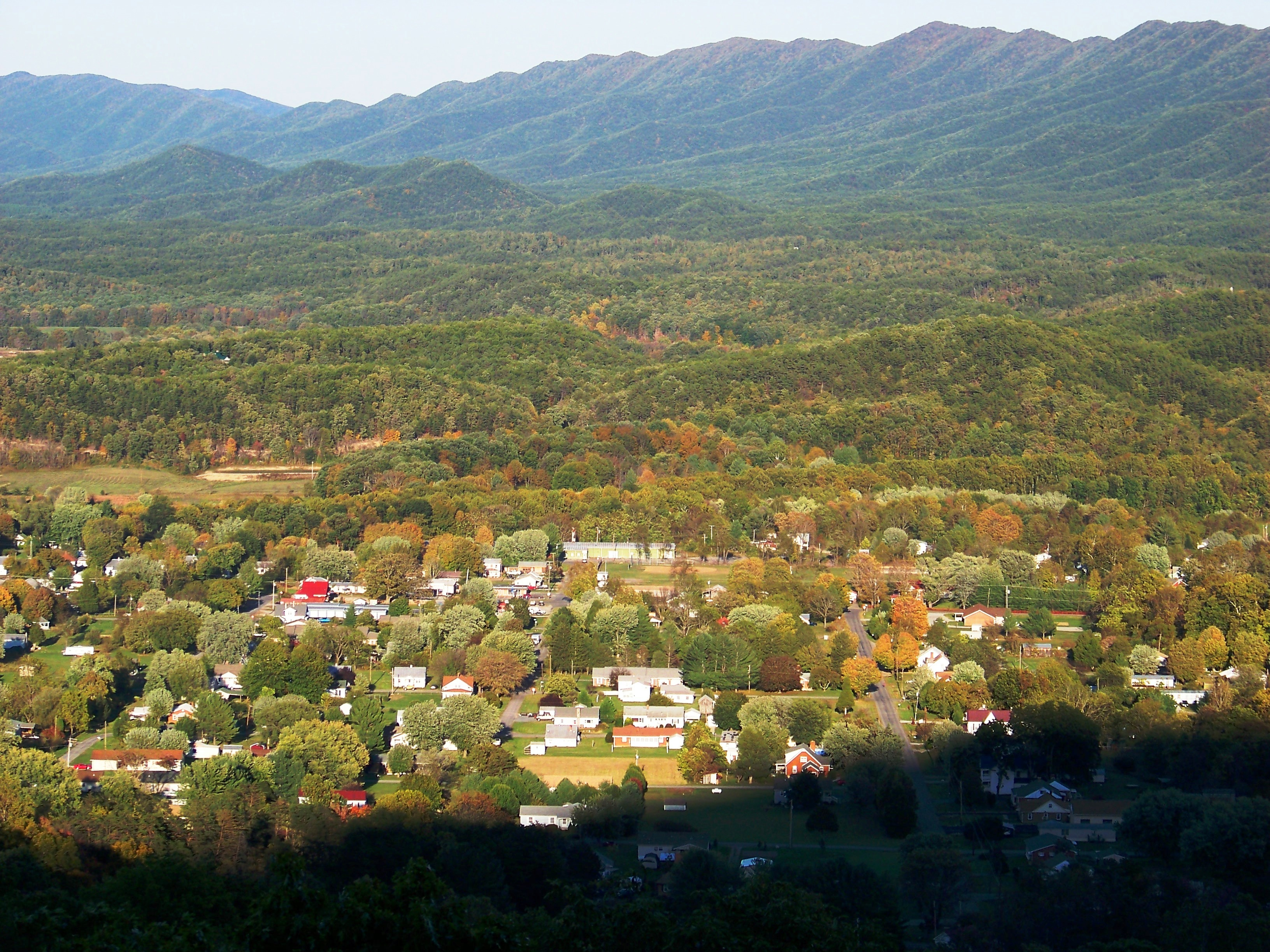
New Castle, Virginia

1983 Map of the north portion of the Jefferson National Forest in southwest Virginia

The cluster can be accessed from Va 615 which travels north from New Castle, Virginia to Oriskany, Virginia along the western side of the cluster. Six miles northeast of New Castle, Va 606 cuts off from Va 615 traveling southeast and crossing Price Mountain while intersecting with the Price Mountain Trail. Access from other roads and trails are found on National Geographic Maps 788 (Covington, Alleghany Highlands. A great variety of information, including topographic maps, aerial views, satellite data and weather information, is obtained by selecting the link with the wild land’s coordinates in the upper right of this page.

Price Mountain Trail and North Mountain Trail follow the ridge lines of the mountains with views of the valleys below.

== Biological significance ==
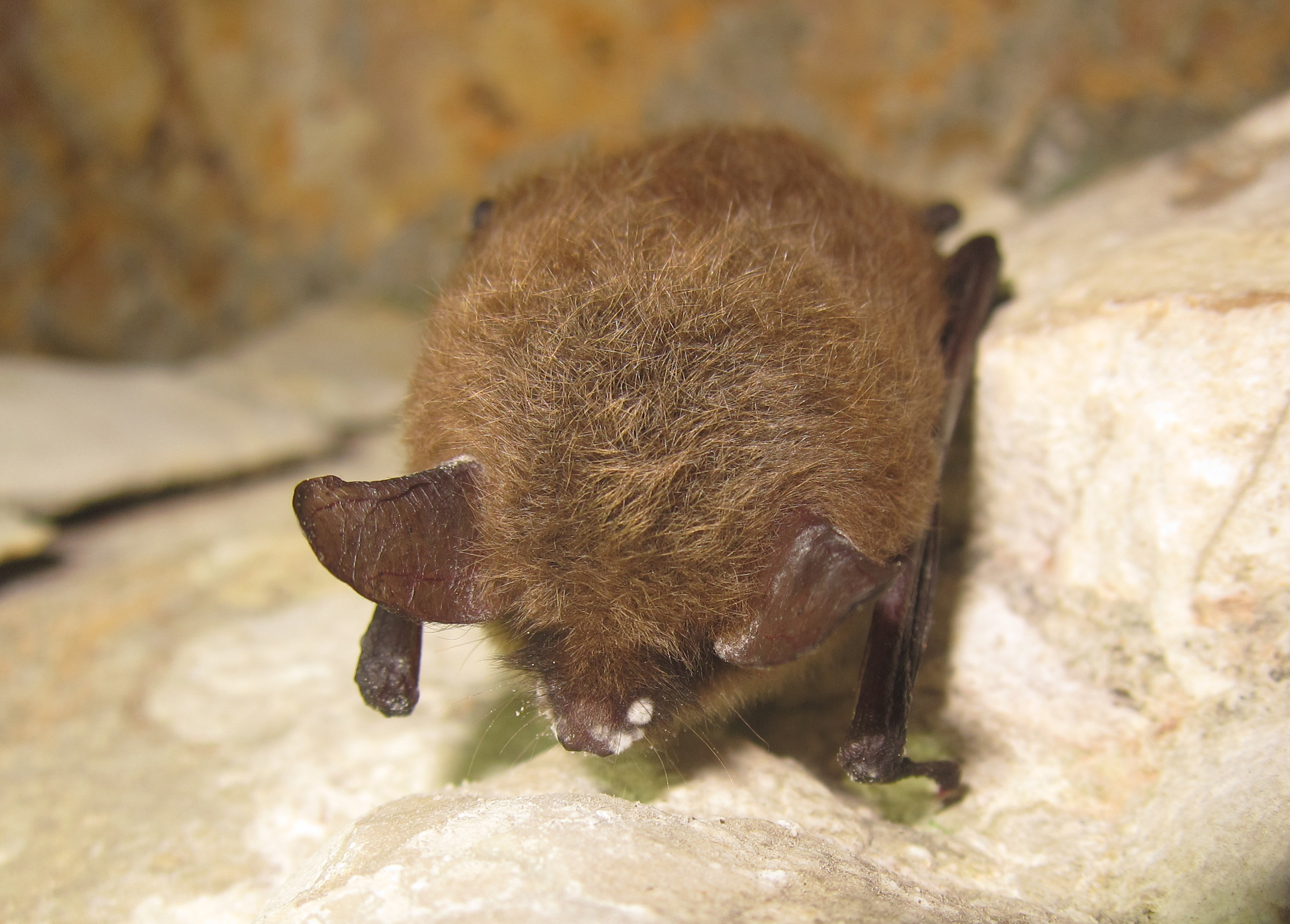
Northern long-eared bat with visible symptoms of White-nose syndrome

The habitat of the southern Appalachians is rich in its biological diversity with nearly 10,000 species, some not found anywhere else. The great diversity is related to the many ridges and valleys which form isolated communities in which species evolve separately from one another. The region lies south of the glaciers that covered North America 11,000 years go. To escape the glaciers, northern species retreated south to find refuge in the southern Appalachians. When the glaciers retreated, many of these species remained along with the southern species that were native to the area. The diversity includes trees, mosses, millipedes and salamanders.

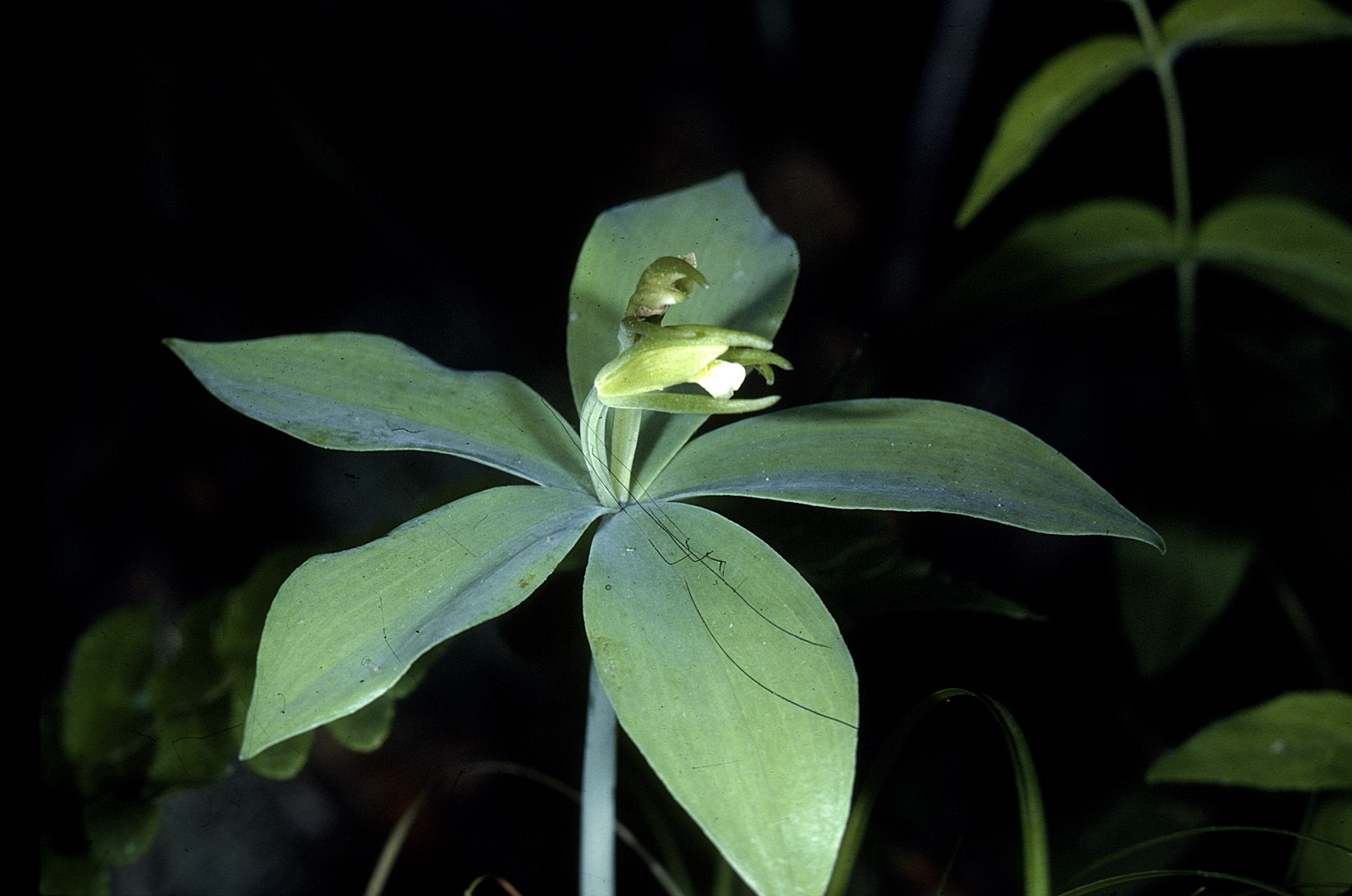
small whorled pogonia

Biodiversity in the southern Appalachians is being threatened by the cutting down of forests, damming off rivers and the paving of land for farms and towns, leading to the loss of species by fragmentation of the ecological landscape. Many species, once common and abundant, are now confined to islands of refuge. The national forests provide enclaves for the survival of many threatened species.

Rare species found in the area of the Craig Creek Cluster include a variety of flora and fauna--mussels, the Atlantic Pigtoe and James Spineymussel; a fish, the Orange Madtom; mammals, the northern long-eared Myotis and the Indiana Bat;, and a vascular plant, the small whorled pogonia.

== Geologic history ==
The cluster contains North Mountain, Patterson Mountain and Price Mountain; long, linear ridges, typical of the Ridge and Valley Province. Craig Creek and Catawba Creek, the two principal creeks in the area, are tributaries of the James River.

== New Castle Ranger District ==
The cluster is in the former New Castle Ranger District, which has now been absorbed into the Eastern Divide Ranger District. The New Castle Ranger District included Craig County and parts of Botetourt and Monroe County in West Virginia. The ridges of the New Castle District were once covered with a forest composed of about 50% chestnut trees, often growing as high as 120 feet with a 10-foot diameter. The wood was lightweight, straight-grained and split easily. Mast from the trees supplied nourishment to both people and wildlife. In 1906 a fungus from China was introduced that killed 3.5 billion trees with a devastating effect on those who had come to depend on it. In 1938, The New Castle district had an estimated 15,000 – 20,000 cords of dead chestnut.

Between the late eighteenth and early nineteenth century, industrial woodcutting supplied charcoal firing for iron making. Consuming an acre of forest per day, the cutting lay bare bottomland forest and mountainside woods. Following the Civil War, annual plowing and grazing created soil erosion impacting wildlife. Game populations were reduced by unregulated hunting as well as the practice of field burning that left hillsides bare. Then construction of railroads in the late nineteenth and early twentieth centuries supported the intensive cutting of trees on an industrial level leading to degradation of much of the forests in southwest Virginia. The eastern national forests were created to restore the integrity of the forest lands.

== Other clusters ==
Other clusters of the Wilderness Society's "Mountain Treasures" in the Jefferson National Forest (north to south):

- Glenwood Cluster
- Barbours Creek-Shawvers Run Cluster
- Sinking Creek Valley Cluster
- Mountain Lake Wilderness Cluster
- Angels Rest Cluster
- Walker Mountain Cluster
- Kimberling Creek Cluster
- Garden Mountain Cluster
- Mount Rogers Cluster
- Clinch Ranger District Cluster
