= Spesard Knob =

Protected natural area in Virginia, United States

- Location within Virginia
- Location: Craig County, Virginia, United States
- Coordinates: 37°27′47″N 80°4′55″W
- Area: 2,084 acres (8.43 km^{2})
- Administrator: U.S. Forest Service

Spesard Knob, a wildland in the George Washington and Jefferson National Forests of western Virginia, has been recognized by the Wilderness Society as a special place worthy of protection from logging and road construction. The Wilderness Society has designated the area as a "Mountain Treasure".

With 226 acres of possible old growth forest and unfragmented habit for black bear, the area offers a unique off-trail hiking experience in a remote forest near New Castle. The area is part of the Craig Creek Cluster.

== Location and access ==
The area is located in the Appalachian Mountains of Southwestern Virginia, about 3 miles south of New Castle, Virginia. State Route Va 618 passes along the eastern and southern side of the area. A powerline separates the area from the Broad Run wild area on the north.

There are no trails or roads into the area.

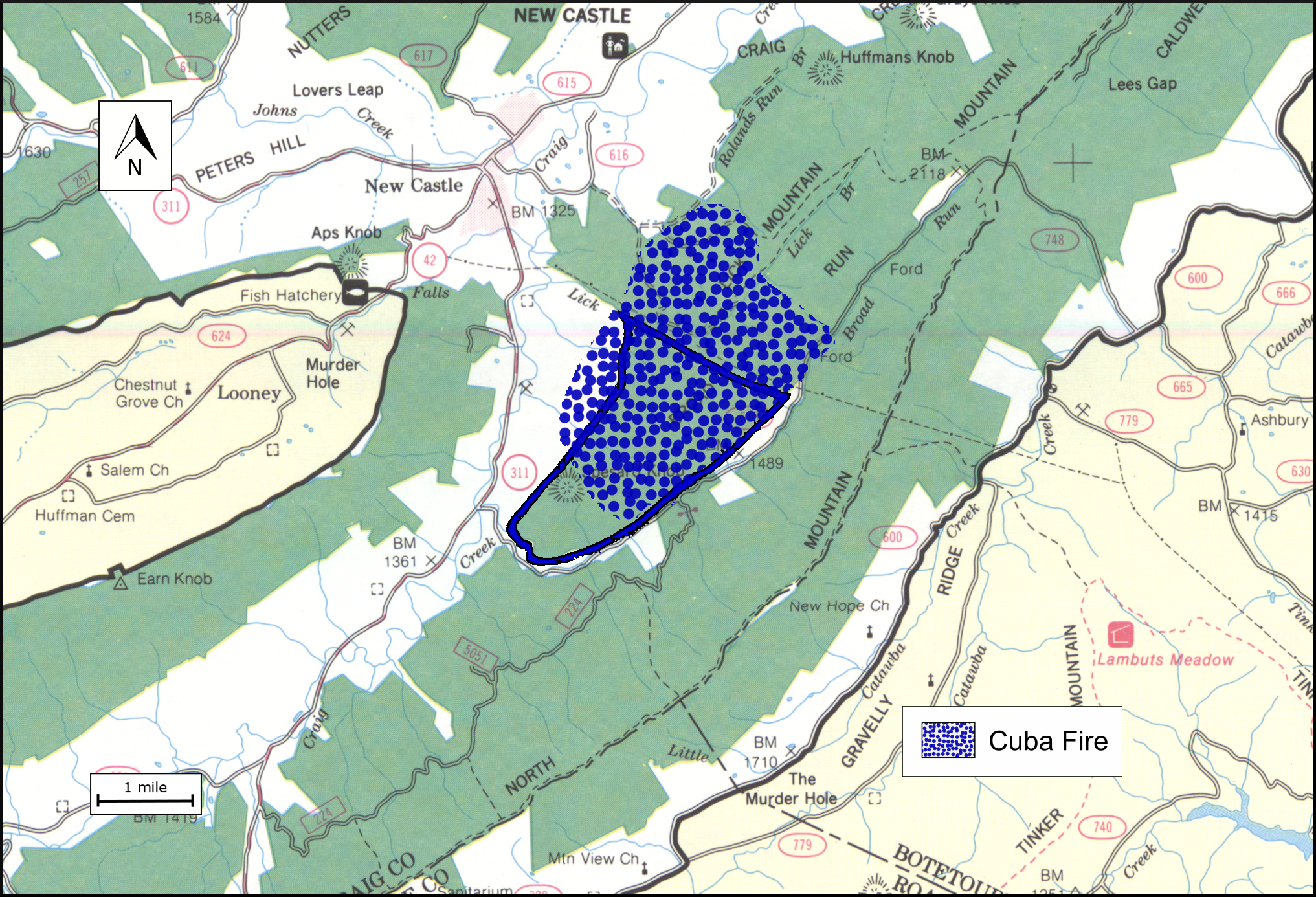
Boundary of the Spesard Knob wildland as identified by the Wilderness Society

The boundary of the wildland, as determined by the Wilderness Society, is shown in the adjacent map. Additional roads in the vicinity are given on National Geographic Maps 788 (Covington, Alleghany Highlands).

Beyond maintained trails, old logging roads can be used to explore the area. The Appalachian Mountains were extensively timbered in the early twentieth century leaving logging roads that are becoming overgrown but still passable. Old logging roads and railroad grades can be located by consulting the historical topographic maps available from the United States Geological Survey (USGS). The Spesard Knob wild area is covered by USGS topographic map Catawba.

== Natural history ==
The area is within the Ridge and Valley Subsection of the Northern Ridge and Valley Section in the Central Appalachian Broadleaf Coniferous Forest-Meadow Province. A shale barrens, the Broad Run barren, is on the western side of the area. Shale barrens in western Virginia provide habitat for the Appalachian grizzled skipper.

Although small, the area forms an important wildlife corridor between the Broad Run wild area to the north and North Mountain on the southeast.

Several old growth tracts have trees as old as 140 years of age or older.

== Topography ==
The area includes several peaks over 2000 feet elevation, including the 2034-foot Spesard Knob on the southwestern side of the area. Spesard Knob is part of a mountain complex at the southern end of Broad Run Mountain where Craig Creek has breached the ridge that continues as Sinking Creek Mountain on the south.

Broad Run flows along the southeastern side of the area. Lick Branch, on the north boundary of the area, drains into Craig Creek. Other streams in the area are also part of the Craig Creek drainage, a tributary of the James River.

== Forest Service management ==
The Forest Service has conducted a survey of their lands to determine the potential for wilderness designation. Wilderness designation provides a high degree of protection from development. The areas that were found suitable are referred to as inventoried roadless areas. Later a Roadless Rule was adopted that limited road construction in these areas. The rule provided some degree of protection by reducing the negative environmental impact of road construction and thus promoting the conservation of roadless areas. Spesard Knob was not inventoried in the roadless area review, and therefore not protected from possible road construction and timber sales.

The Cuba wildfire in 2008 burned a large part on the north side of the area as well as part of the adjacent Broad Run wild area.

The forest service classifies areas under their management by a recreational opportunity setting that informs visitors of the diverse range of opportunities available in the forest. Most of the area is designated "Backcountry-Non Motorized". A portion on the western tip is designated as "Rare Community".

== See also ==
- Atlas of Rare Butterflies, Skippers, Moths, Dragonflies & Damselflies of Virginia
- Craig Creek Cluster
