= Sinking Creek Mountain =

Protected natural area in Virginia, United States

- Location within Virginia
- Location: Craig County; Virginia, United States
- Nearest town: New Castle, Virginia
- Coordinates: 37°25′45″N 80°10′41″W
- Area: 6,411 acres (25.94 km^{2})
- Administrator: U.S. Forest Service

Sinking Creek Mountain, a wildland in the George Washington and Jefferson National Forests of western Virginia, has been recognized by the Wilderness Society as a special place worthy of protection from logging and road construction. The Wilderness Society has designated the area as a "Mountain Treasure".

The site contains bogs, springs, and sag ponds created by ancient landslides, the largest slides in the eastern United States, some as long as 3 miles, with a variety of biological communities.

The area is part of the Sinking Creek Valley Cluster.

== Location and access ==
The area is located in the Appalachian Mountains of Southwestern Virginia, about 3 miles south of New Castle, Virginia. Va 42 is on the northwest side of the area and Va 621 is on the southeast. Hall Road, Forest Road 209, follows along the southeast border. There are no official trails in the area. Access can be gained from Earn Knob Road, Forest Road 5021, 4.7 mile long, on the western end of the area, and Enterprise Road, Forest Road 742, 1.9 miles long, on the eastern end.

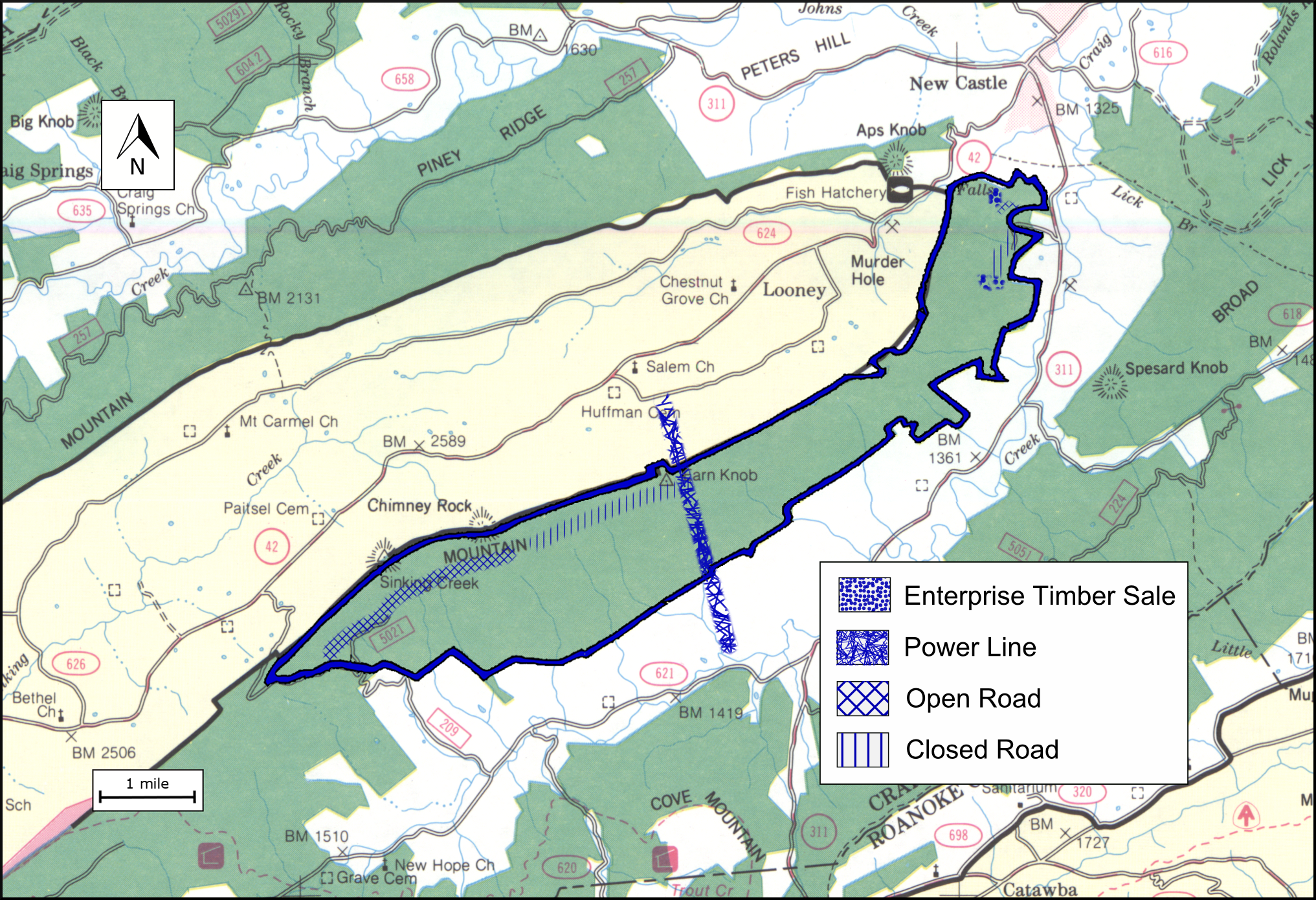
Boundary of the Sinking Creek Mountain wild area as identified by the Wilderness Society

The boundary of the wildland, as determined by the Wilderness Society, is shown in the adjacent map. Additional roads are given on National Geographic Maps 788 (Covington, Alleghany Highlands). A great variety of information, including topographic maps, aerial views, satellite data and weather information, is obtained by selecting the link with the wild land's coordinates in the upper right of this page.

Beyond maintained trails, old logging roads can be used to explore the area. The Appalachian Mountains were extensively timbered in the early twentieth century leaving logging roads that are becoming overgrown but still passable. Old logging roads and railroad grades can be located by consulting the historical topographic maps available from the United States Geological Survey (USGS). The Sinking Creek Mountain wild area is covered by USGS topographic maps Looney, Catawba and Craig Springs.

== Natural history ==
The area is within the Ridge and Valley Subsection of the Northern Ridge and Valley Section in the Central Appalachian Broadleaf Coniferous Forest-Meadow Province. The northern end of the area contains habitat for species, such as black bear, that require a large land area removed from human activity.

The upper part of the mountain ridge, and some isolated draws, contain old growth forest.

Prehistoric landslides modified the soils in the area of the slides, creating habitat for evergreen vegetation not found below the slides where deciduous vegetation is more common. And ferns, not common below the slides, are found in swamps and ponds in the area of the slides.

== Topography ==
The area is dominated by Sinking Creek Mountain, a long ridge, about 3600 feet high, forming the northwestern border of the area. Chimney Rock, with an elevation of 3638 feet, and Earn Knob, at 3600 feet, are prominent points along the ridge. Meadow Creek Falls, on the northern end, has a scenic 500-foot waterfall.

The area, part of the James River watershed, drains into Craig Creek which flows north to the James River.

== Ancient landslides ==
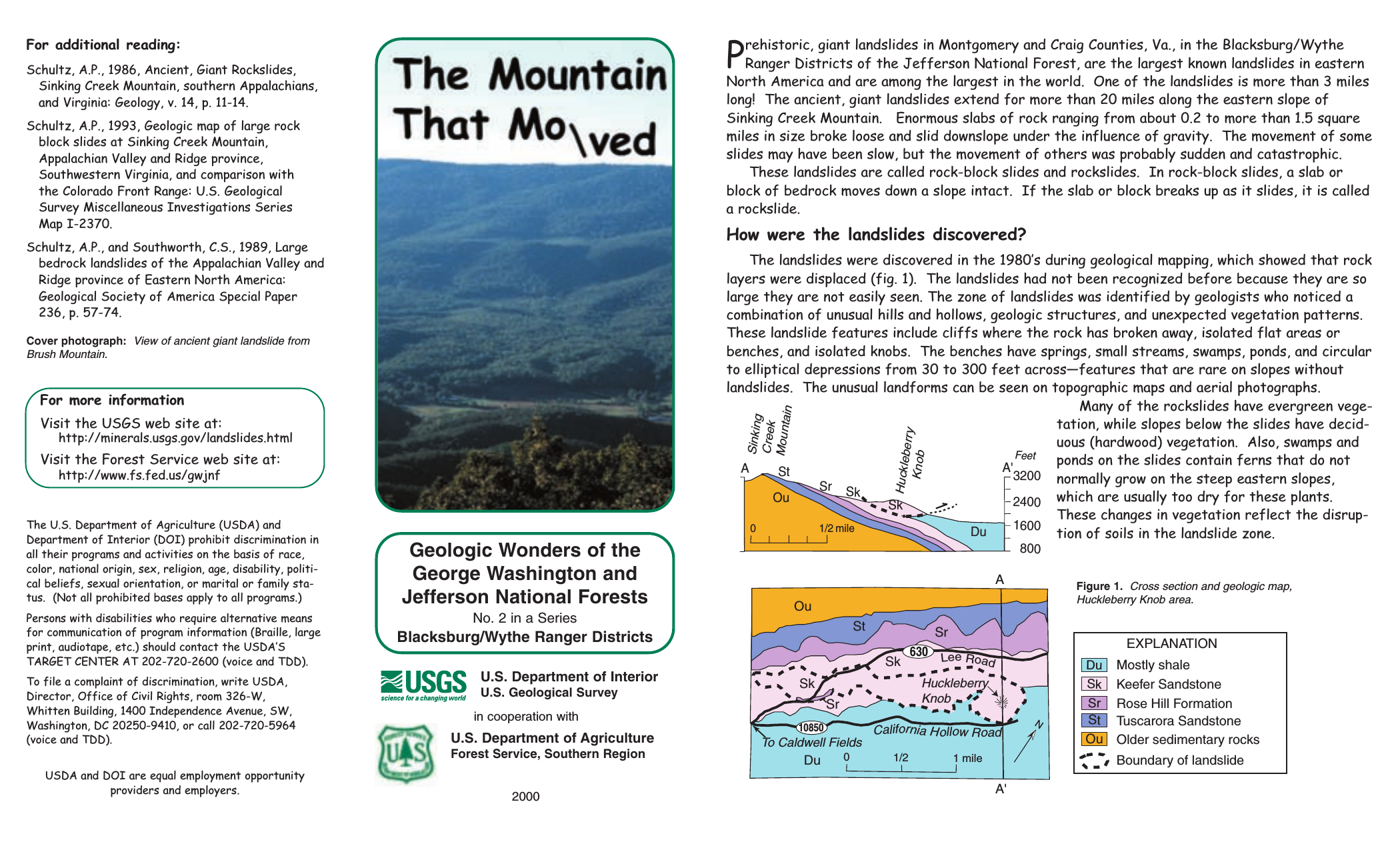
Sinking Creek Landslide, page 1

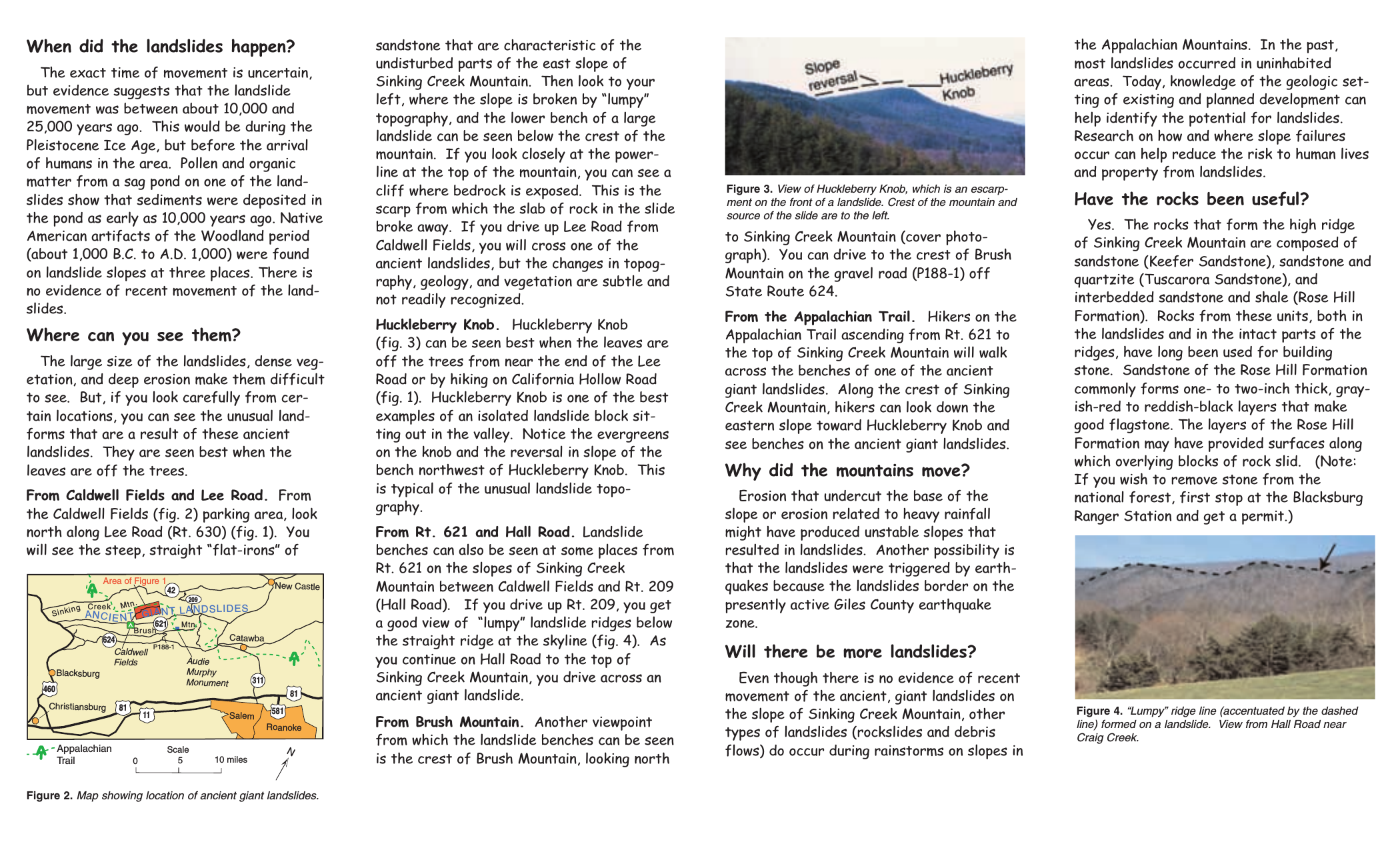
Sinking Creek Landslide, page 2

Large landslides on Sinking Creek Mountain occurred in prehistoric times, probably 10,000 to 20,000 years ago before humans settled the area. Extending over 20 miles on the eastern side of Sinking Creek Mountain, the landslides are some of the largest in the world. Rocks, with a size as large as 1.5 square miles, were carried away by the slide. Some of the rocks moved down the hillside intact, while others broke up during the slide.

Evidence of the landslide can be seen while driving along Hall Road, Forest Road 209, on the southeastern border of the area. More information is given by selecting the thumbnails on the left.

== Forest Service management ==
The Forest Service has conducted a survey of their lands to determine the potential for wilderness designation. Wilderness designation provides a high degree of protection from development. The areas that were found suitable are referred to as inventoried roadless areas. Later a Roadless Rule was adopted that limited road construction in these areas. The rule provides some degree of protection by reducing the negative environmental impact of road construction and thus promoting the conservation of roadless areas. Sinking Creek Mountain was not inventoried in the roadless area review, and therefore not protected from possible road construction and timber sales.

The forest service classifies areas under their management by a recreational opportunity setting that informs visitors of the diverse range of opportunities available in the forest. Most of the area is managed as "Black Bear Habitat" with "Scenic Corridor" designation on the far eastern side of the area.

The Enterprise timber sale, a 65-acre area on the eastern end, was approved in 2002. The Enterprise Road was lengthened by 1.2 miles for the sale, but the new road is now closed to motor vehicles.

A powerline, running north to south near the end of Earn Knob Road, bisects the area.

== Cultural history ==
In 1872 Addison Caldwell, from the community of Sinking Creek, marched 26 miles across Sinking Creek Mountain and Brush Mountain to become the first student at Virginia Tech. The Virginia Tech corps of cadets observes this event with the Caldwell March.

== See also ==
- Sinking Creek Landslide
- Sinking Creek Valley Cluster
- Southeastern Geological Society field log
- Video clip on Sinking Creek landslide
- Report on Sinking Creek Mountain landslide by Virginia Division of Geology and Mineral Resources
