= Broad Run (conservation area) =

Protected natural area in Virginia, United States

- Location within Virginia
- Location: Craig County; Botetourt County; Virginia, United States
- Coordinates: 37°29′54″N 80°1′45″W
- Area: 10,964 acres (44.37 km^{2})
- Administrator: U.S. Forest Service

Broad Run, a wildland in the George Washington and Jefferson National Forests of western Virginia, has been recognized by the Wilderness Society as a special place worthy of protection from logging and road construction. The Wilderness Society has designated the area as a "Mountain Treasure".

Close to New Castle, yet considered a remote area, the site features a pristine, low-elevation stream and three mountains separated by steep drainages.

The area is part of the Craig Creek Cluster.

== Location and access ==
The area is located in the Appalachian Mountains of Southwestern Virginia, about 4 miles east of New Castle, Virginia. It is between Va 614 on the west and Va 666 on the east.

Trails into the area include:

- Ferrier Trail, Forest Trail 189, 2.34 miles
- Lick Branch Trail, Forest Trail 262, 5.21 miles
- North Mountain Trail, Forest Trail 263, 13.2 miles
- Lees Creek Trail, Forest Trail 5011, 2.71 miles

Three roads give access to the area: Hebron Road, Route 5064; Price Mountain, Route 5012; and Larsen Road, Route 5061.

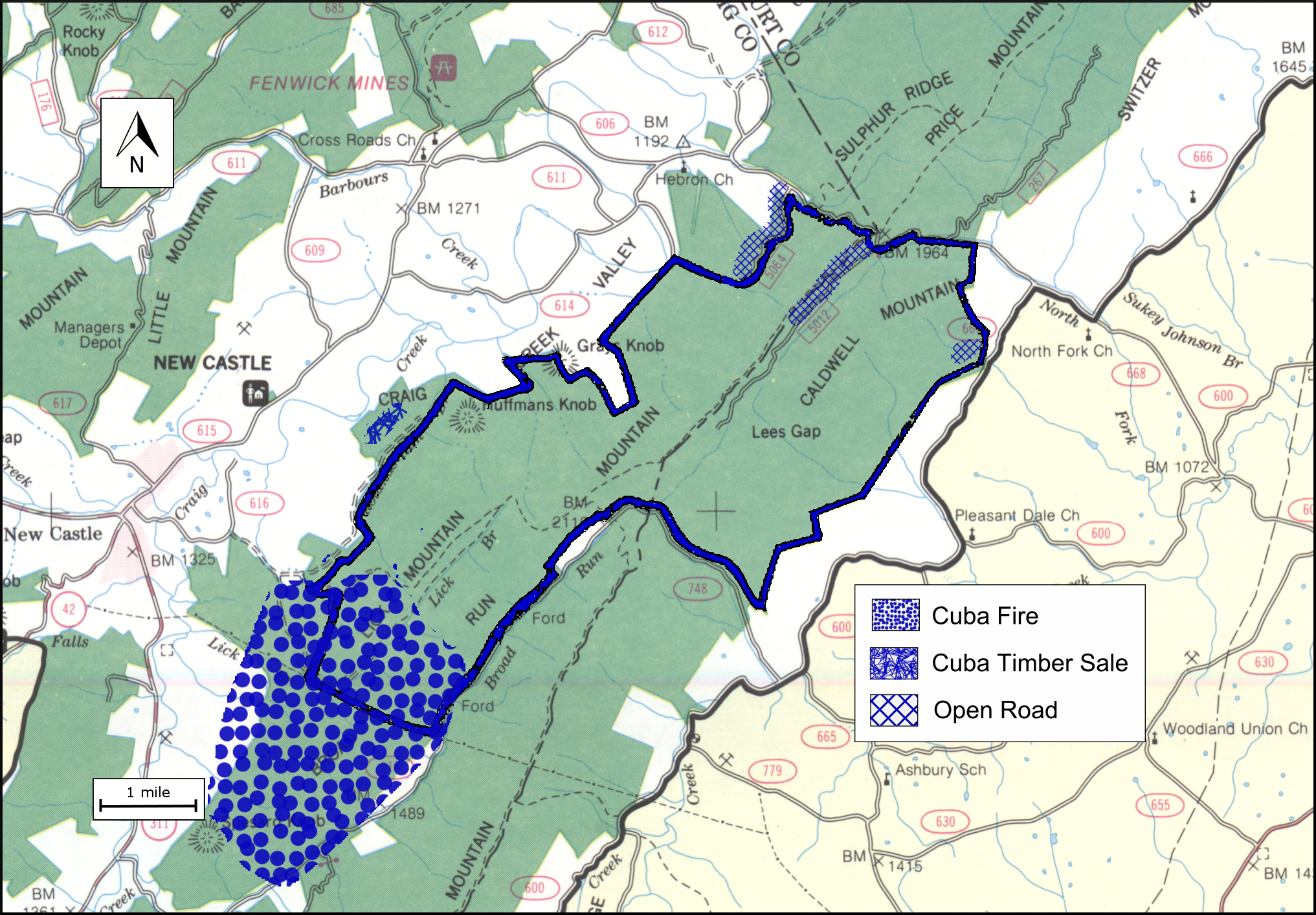
Boundary of the Broad Run wildland as identified by the Wilderness Society

The boundary of the wildland, as determined by the Wilderness Society, is shown in the adjacent map. Additional roads and trails are given on National Geographic Maps 788 (Covington, Alleghany Highlands). A great variety of information, including topographic maps, aerial views, satellite data and weather information, is obtained by selecting the link with the wild land's coordinates in the upper right of this page.

Beyond maintained trails, old logging roads can be used to explore the area. The Appalachian Mountains were extensively timbered in the early twentieth century leaving logging roads that are becoming overgrown but still passable. Old logging roads and railroad grades can be located by consulting the historical topographic maps available from the United States Geological Survey (USGS). The Broad Run wild area is covered by USGS topographic maps New Castle, Catawba, Oriskany and Daleville.

== Natural history ==
The area is within the Ridge and Valley Subsection of the Northern Ridge and Valley Section in the Central Appalachian Broadleaf Coniferous Forest-Meadow Province. Yellow poplar, northern red oak, white oak, basswood, cucumber tree, white ash, eastern hemlock and red maple are found in colluvial drainages, toeslopes and along flood plains of small to medium-sized streams. White oak, northern red oak, and hickory dominate on the north and west, while chestnut oak, scarlet oak and yellow pine are found on ridgetops and exposed sites.

The area includes the Lick Branch Barren special biological area and Central Appalachian shale barrens terrestrial community. The shale barren provides habitat for the Virginia white-haired leatherflower. The narrow-leaved blue-curls has been seen within the area.

== Topography ==
The area is distinguished by ridges that trend northeast–southwest. The ridges, composed of sandstone or shale, have parallel drainages flowing into broad limestone valleys. The area has three separate ridges, Lick Mountain, Broad Run Mountain, and Caldwell Mountain, with small steep sideslope drainages. From a 2964-foot peak along the crest of Broad Run Mountain, the elevation dips to 1240 feet at Rolands Run Branch on the northwest.

Silurian-aged sandstone underlays about 75 percent of the area, with the remaining area underlain by Braillier and Martinsburg shale.

== Forest Service management ==
The Forest Service has conducted a survey of their lands to determine the potential for wilderness designation. Wilderness designation provides a high degree of protection from development. The areas that were found suitable are referred to as inventoried roadless areas. Later a Roadless Rule was adopted that limited road construction in these areas. The rule provided some degree of protection by reducing the negative environmental impact of road construction and thus promoting the conservation of roadless areas. Broad Run was inventoried in the roadless area review, and therefore protected from possible road construction and timber sales.

The Cuba timber sale of 40 acres occurred in 2000 on land north of Rolands Run, just north of the wild area. In the southwest, the Cuba wildfire in 2008 burned part of this area as well as part of the adjacent Spesard Knob wild area.

The forest service classifies areas under their management by a recreational opportunity setting that informs visitors of the diverse range of opportunities available in the forest. The uplands of Lick Mountain, Broad Run Mountain, and Caldwell Mountain were designated "Backcountry-Non Motorized", while lower elevations on the northeast are designated "Dispersed Recreation Area-Suitable for Timber Production". There is a small area designated as "Rare Community".

== Cultural history ==
A 1998 survey of a small part of the area found three transient camps and a hunting station believed to have been used prior to 1,000 B. C. A 19th century mining complex and colliers pit were also discovered.

== See also ==
- Craig Creek Cluster
