= Patterson Mountain =

Protected natural area in Virginia, United States

- Location within Virginia
- Location: Botetourt County, Virginia, United States
- Coordinates: 37°36′48″N 79°55′43″W
- Area: 4,863 acres (19.68 km^{2})
- Administrator: U.S. Forest Service

Patterson Mountain, a wildland in the George Washington and Jefferson National Forests of western Virginia, has been recognized by the Wilderness Society as a special place worthy of protection from logging and road construction. The Wilderness Society has designated the area as a "Mountain Treasure".

Hiking trails in the area include the Patterson Mountain Trail with good views of surrounding mountains from a 2250-foot ridge top.

The area is part of the Craig Creek Cluster.

== Location and access ==
The area is located in the Appalachian Mountains of Southwestern Virginia, about 24 miles north of Roanoke, Virginia. It is between Va 817 on the west and Va 655 and Va 666 on the east.

Trails into the area include:

- Patterson Mountain, Forest Service Trail 148, 5.5 miles
- Tucker, FS 191, 0.85 miles
- Helms, FS 181, 1.1 miles
- Elmore, FS 151, 1.56 miles

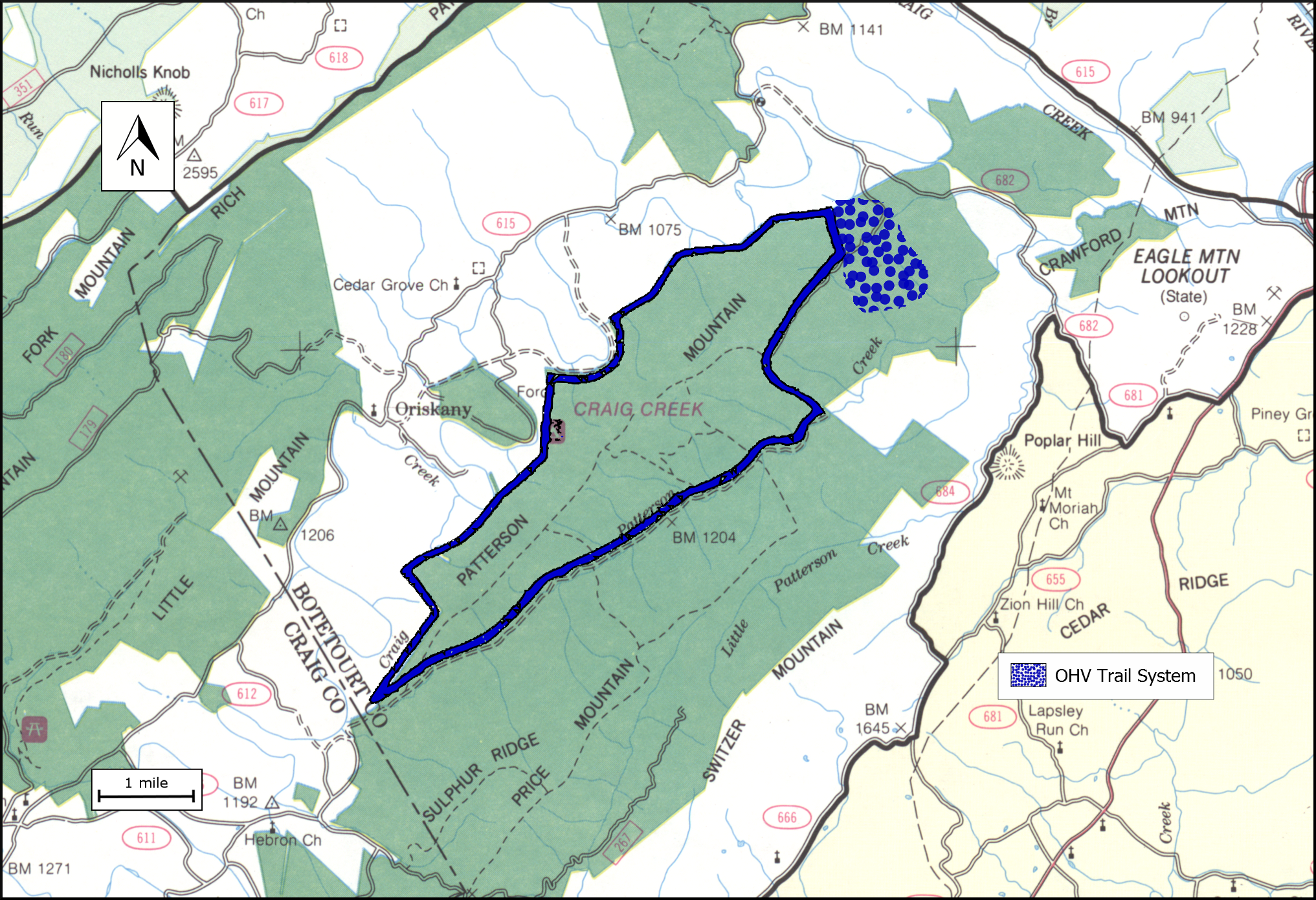
Boundary of the Patterson Mountain wildland as identified by the Wilderness Society

The boundary of the wildland, as determined by the Wilderness Society, is shown in the adjacent map. Additional roads and trails are given on National Geographic Maps 788 (Covington, Alleghany Highlands). A great variety of information, including topographic maps, aerial views, satellite data and weather information, is obtained by selecting the link with the wild land's coordinates in the upper right of this page.

Beyond maintained trails, old logging roads can be used to explore the area. The Appalachian Mountains were extensively timbered in the early twentieth century leaving logging roads that are becoming overgrown but still passable. Old logging roads and railroad grades can be located by consulting the historical topographic maps available from the United States Geological Survey (USGS). The Patterson Mountain wild area is covered by USGS topographic maps Oriskany and Strom.

== Natural history ==
Yellow poplar, northern red oak, white oak, basswood, cucumber tree, white ash, eastern hemlock and red maple are found in colluvial drainages, toeslopes and along flood plains of small to medium-sized streams. White oak, northern red oak, and hickory dominate on the north and west, while chestnut oak, scarlet oak and yellow pine are found on ridgetops and exposed sites.

The area has been the source of numerous sightings of the orangefin madtom. The area contains part of the Central Appalachian Shale Barrens where the rare Virginia white-haired leatherflower is found

Several rare shale barrens biological communities are found here. They include the County Line Barrens and Little Patterson special biological areas along Little Patterson Creek, and the Horton Barren and Patterson Mountain Barren special biological areas found along Craig Creek.

The rare butternut tree has been found in one of the area's drainages.

== Topography ==
The area is part of the Ridge and Valley Subsection of the Northern Ridge and Valley Ecosystem Section, with rock types dominated by sandstone in the upper slopes and ridge tops, and shale and limestone in the bedrock on lower slopes.

With a ridgetop extending along the area and many sideslope drainages, Patterson Mountain dominates the area. From a high elevation of 2260 feet at a crest of the mountain, the elevation dips to 1133 feet at the beginning of the Elmore Trail on Forest Rod 184.

== Forest Service management ==
The Forest Service has conducted a survey of their lands to determine the potential for wilderness designation. Wilderness designation provides a high degree of protection from development. The areas that were found suitable are referred to as inventoried roadless areas. Later a Roadless Rule was adopted that limited road construction in these areas. The rule provided some degree of protection by reducing the negative environmental impact of road construction and thus promoting the conservation of roadless areas. Patterson Mountain was inventoried in the roadless area review, and therefore protected from possible road construction and timber sales.

A 2009 study concluded that annual maintenance in the area was not keeping up with continual degradation leading to gullied trails, sediment in stream channels and unlawful use in sensitive riparian habitat. The adjacent Patterson Mountain Off-Highway Vehicle Trail system was closed pending an agency review.

The forest service classifies areas under their management by a recreational opportunity setting that informs visitors of the diverse range of opportunities available in the forest. A large part of the area is designated "Backcountry-Non Motorized". An area along Patterson Creek is designated "Mix of Successional Habitats" and there is a small area designated as "Rare Community".

== See also ==
- Craig Creek Cluster
