= North Mountain (conservation area) =

Protected natural area in Virginia, United States

- Location within Virginia
- Location: Craig County; Botetourt County; Roanoke County; Virginia, United States
- Coordinates: 37°25′20″N 80°4′25″W
- Area: 8,409 acres (34.03 km^{2})
- Administrator: U.S. Forest Service

North Mountain, a wildland in the George Washington and Jefferson National Forests of western Virginia, has been recognized by the Wilderness Society as a special place worthy of protection from logging and road construction. The Wilderness Society has designated the area as a "Mountain Treasure".

With a network of trails, the area offers an opportunity for secluded outdoor recreation close to Roanoke.

The area is part of the Craig Creek Cluster.

== Location and access ==
The area is located in the Appalachian Mountains of Southwestern Virginia, about 6 miles southeast of New Castle, Virginia. It is between Catawba Creek Road (VA 779) on the southeast and Wildlife Road (Forest Road 224) on the northwest.

Trails into the area include:

- North Mountain Trail, Forest Trail 263, 13.2 miles, difficult, yellow blazed
- Deer Trail, Forest Trail 186, 1.6 miles, difficult, blue blazed
- Turkey Trail, Forest Trail 187, 1.6 miles, difficult, blue blazed
- Grouse Trail, Forest Trail 188, 1.5 miles, difficult, blue blazed

Wildlife Road (Forest Road 224) gives access to the area in the northwest.

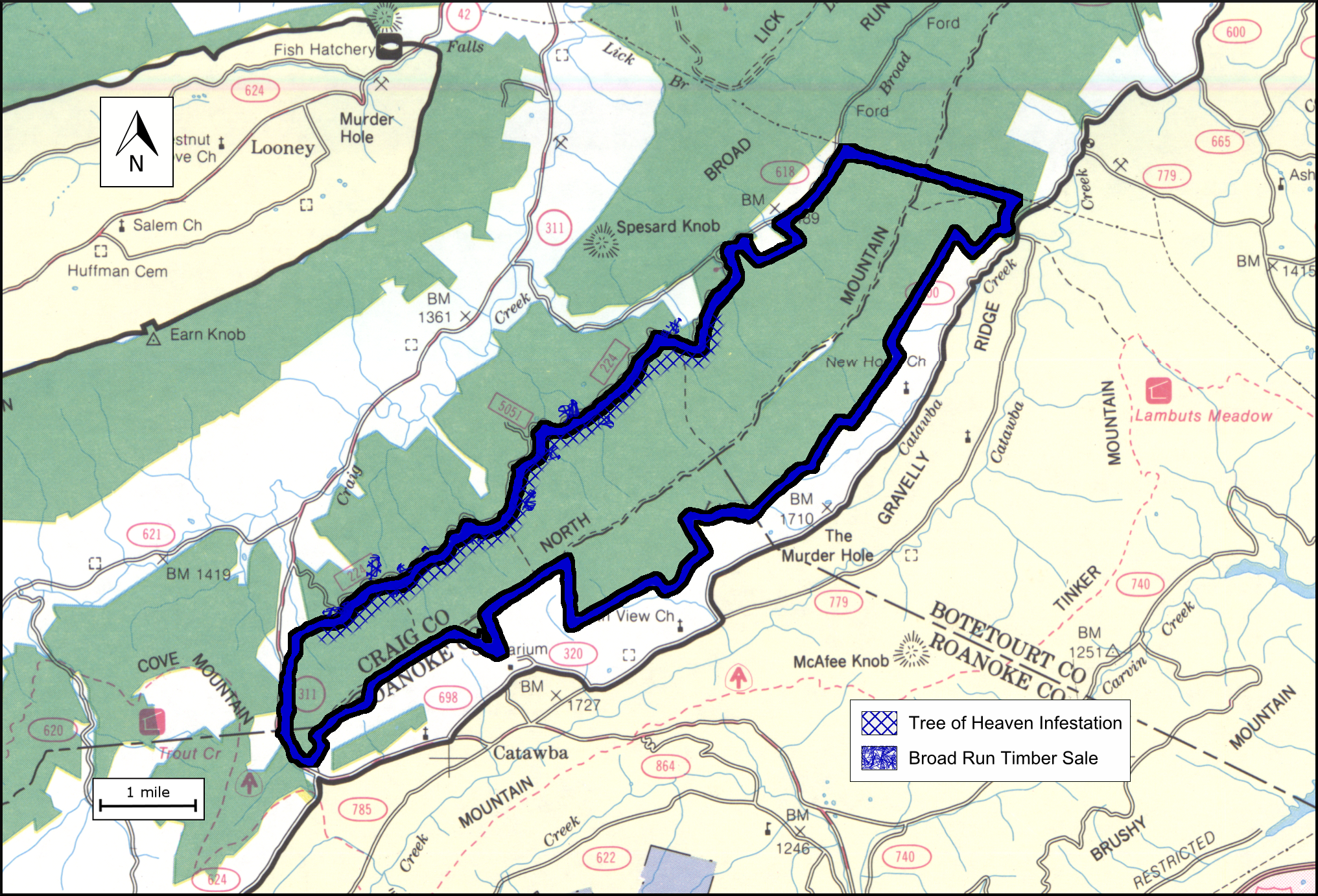
Boundary of the North Mountain wildland as identified by the Wilderness Society

The boundary of the wildland, as determined by the Wilderness Society, is shown in the adjacent map. Additional roads and trails are given on National Geographic Maps 788 (Covington, Alleghany Highlands). A great variety of information, including topographic maps, aerial views, satellite data and weather information, is obtained by selecting the link with the wild land's coordinates in the upper right of this page.

Beyond maintained trails, old logging roads can be used to explore the area. The Appalachian Mountains were extensively timbered in the early twentieth century leaving logging roads that are becoming overgrown but still passable. Old logging roads and railroad grades can be located by consulting the historical topographic maps available from the United States Geological Survey (USGS). The North Mountain wild area is covered by USGS topographic maps Catawba and Looney.

== Natural history ==
The area is within the Ridge and Valley Subsection of the Northern Ridge and Valley Section in the Central Appalachian Broadleaf Coniferous Forest-Meadow Province. Yellow poplar, northern red oak, white oak, basswood, cucumber tree, white ash, eastern hemlock and red maple are found in colluvial drainages, toeslopes and along flood plains of small to medium-sized streams. White oak, northern red oak, and hickory dominate on the north and west, while chestnut oak, scarlet oak and yellow pine are found on ridgetops and exposed sites. There are about 39 acres of the Dragons Tooth Trail/McAffee Knob Special Biological Area on the southwest boundary.

Unusual flora and fauna found in the area include a globally rare shrub, the pirate bush, vascular plants, the small spreading pogonia, sword-leaved phlox, and the Orangefin madtom.

There are stands of pure table mountain pine, mostly on southeast to southwest facing ridges and slopes with dry, well-drained soils; and there are areas of mixed oak and table mountain pine. Table mountain pine requires fire to regenerate because it has serotinous cones that need heat to open and disperse its seeds. Management of these areas require prescribed burns in order to maintain the forest in its present condition.

== Topography ==
The area is distinguished by ridges that trend northeast–southwest. The ridges, composed of sandstone or shale, have parallel drainages flowing into broad limestone valleys. North Mountain is typical with small steep sideslope drainages. The highest elevation is 3062 feet along the crest of North Mountain while the lowest elevation of 1410 feet is near the southeastern edge along VA 600.

Silurian-aged sandstone underlays about 75 percent of the area, with the remaining area underlain by Brallier and Martinsburg shale.

== Forest Service management ==
The Forest Service has conducted a survey of their lands to determine the potential for wilderness designation. Wilderness designation provides a high degree of protection from development. The areas that were found suitable are referred to as inventoried roadless areas. Later a Roadless Rule was adopted that limited road construction in these areas. The rule provided some degree of protection by reducing the negative environmental impact of road construction and thus promoting the conservation of roadless areas. North Mountain was inventoried in the roadless area review, and therefore protected from possible road construction and timber sales.

Herbicide has been used to manage a Tree of Heaven infestation along the Wildlife Road, Rt. 224. A timber sale of 42 acres, the Broad Run timber sale approved in 1998, was accomplished by allowing public firewood cutting without road building, log landings or logging equipment.

The forest service classifies areas under their management by a recreational opportunity setting that informs visitors of the diverse range of opportunities available in the forest. Most of the area is designated "Backcountry—Non-Motorized". Along the Wildlife Road there are areas of "Early Successional Habitat", and a section in Roanoke County is designated "Source Water Protection".

== See also ==
- Craig Creek Cluster
