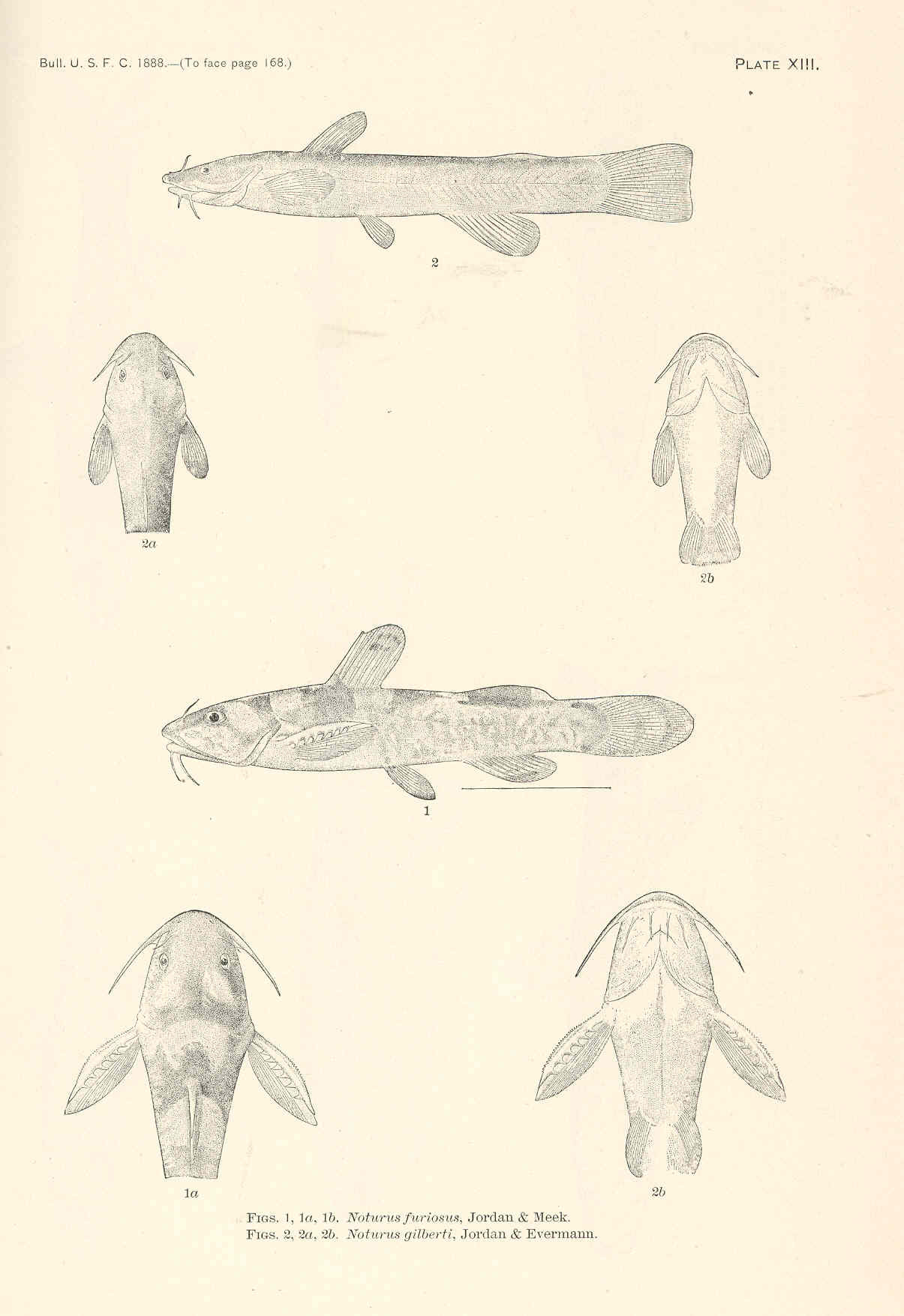

Conservation status
- Endangered (IUCN 3.1)

Scientific classification
- Kingdom: Animalia
- Phylum: Chordata
- Class: Actinopterygii
- Order: Siluriformes
- Family: Ictaluridae
- Genus: Noturus
- Species: N. gilberti

Binomial name
- Noturus gilberti D. S. Jordan & Evermann, 1889

= Orangefin madtom =

Species of fish

The orangefin madtom (Noturus gilberti) is a species of fish in the family Ictaluridae. It is endemic to the United States, and was originally described from the Roanoke River of Virginia.
