= Bắc Sơn district =

Bắc Sơn district Huyện Bắc Sơn
- District
- Location within Vietnam
- Country: Vietnam
- Region: Northeast
- Province: Lạng Sơn
- Capital: Bắc Sơn

Area
  - Total: 269 sq mi (698 km^{2})

Population (2003)
  - Total: 65,073
- Time zone: UTC+7 (Indochina Time)

Bắc Sơn is a former rural district of Lạng Sơn province in the Northeast region of Vietnam. As of 2003 the district had a population of 65,073. The district covers an area of 698 km^{2}. The district capital lies at Bắc Sơn.

== Administrative divisions ==
Bắc Sơn, Long Đống, Quỳnh Sơn, Bắc Sơn, Hữu Vĩnh, Chiêu Vũ, Hưng Vũ, Trấn Yên, Nhất Tiến, Nhất Hòa, Vũ Lăng, Vũ Sơn, Vũ Lễ, Tân Thành, Tân Hương, Tân Lập, Tân Tri, Chiến Thắng, Đồng Ý, Vạn Thủy.

== Climate ==
Climate data for Bắc Sơn, elevation 400 m (1,300 ft)
Month	Jan	Feb	Mar	Apr	May	Jun	Jul	Aug	Sep	Oct	Nov	Dec	Year
Mean daily maximum °C (°F)	16.8 (62.2)	18.0 (64.4)	20.8 (69.4)	25.4 (77.7)	29.3 (84.7)	30.7 (87.3)	30.9 (87.6)	30.7 (87.3)	29.6 (85.3)	27.0 (80.6)	23.2 (73.8)	19.4 (66.9)	25.1 (77.2)
Daily mean °C (°F)	13.1 (55.6)	14.7 (58.5)	17.8 (64.0)	21.9 (71.4)	25.2 (77.4)	26.7 (80.1)	26.8 (80.2)	26.3 (79.3)	25.0 (77.0)	22.2 (72.0)	18.3 (64.9)	14.6 (58.3)	21.1 (70.0)
Mean daily minimum °C (°F)	10.5 (50.9)	12.4 (54.3)	15.7 (60.3)	19.5 (67.1)	22.3 (72.1)	23.8 (74.8)	24.1 (75.4)	23.6 (74.5)	22.1 (71.8)	19.1 (66.4)	15.0 (59.0)	11.3 (52.3)	18.3 (64.9)
Average precipitation mm (inches)	44.3 (1.74)	41.6 (1.64)	65.8 (2.59)	121.9 (4.80)	210.8 (8.30)	227.0 (8.94)	287.9 (11.33)	262.5 (10.33)	160.5 (6.32)	77.6 (3.06)	46.1 (1.81)	27.6 (1.09)	1,575.3 (62.02)
Average rainy days	10.6	11.7	16.6	14.7	13.6	15.0	16.3	16.4	11.7	8.2	6.7	7.3	151.1
Average relative humidity (%)	80.4	82.4	84.5	83.9	81.0	82.0	83.4	84.5	82.1	79.5	78.5	77.4	81.6
Mean monthly sunshine hours	56.6	45.4	49.5	79.6	148.0	150.3	167.5	167.5	169.3	136.7	123.3	112.2	1,393.3
Source: Vietnam Institute for Building Science and Technology
