= 北山 =

北山, meaning "northern mountain(s)", may refer to:

Chinese pinyin reading Bĕishān:

- Beishan, Changsha County, town in Hunan Province, People's Republic of China
- Beishan station, a station on the Guangzhou Metro Line 12, expected to open in 2025.

Korean reading Buksan:

- Buksan, late Joseon period painter

Japanese on-yomi Hokuzan or kun-yomi Kitayama:

- Hokuzan, 14th-century Okinawa kingdom
- Kitayama, Wakayama, exclave village of Wakayama on the Mie–Nara border, Japan
- Kitayama Station (Kōchi)
- Kitayama Station (Kyoto)
- Kitayama Station (Miyagi)
- Kitayama Station (Tochigi)
