= Craig Creek =

Coordinates: 37.64541°N 79.81338°W

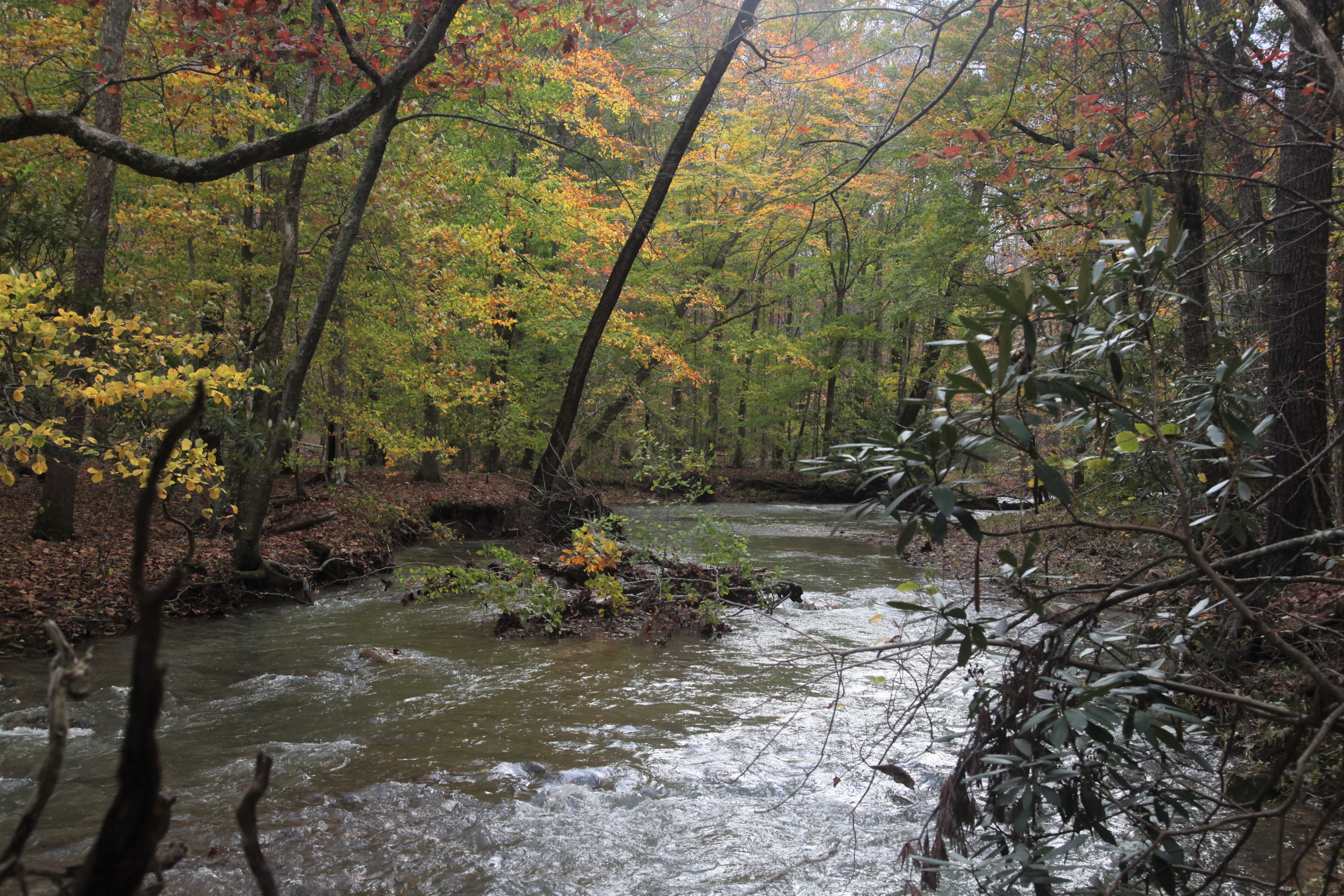
- Headwaters of Craig Creek on border of Brush Mountain Wilderness

Location
- Country: United States

Physical characteristics
- Source
  - location: Virginia
- Length: 84 miles

Craig Creek (also known as Craig's Creek or Craigs Creek) is an 84-mile-long (135 km) tributary of the James River in the U.S. state of Virginia. It flows through the Ridge-and-Valley Appalachians in western Virginia, passing 15 miles (24 km) northwest of Roanoke.

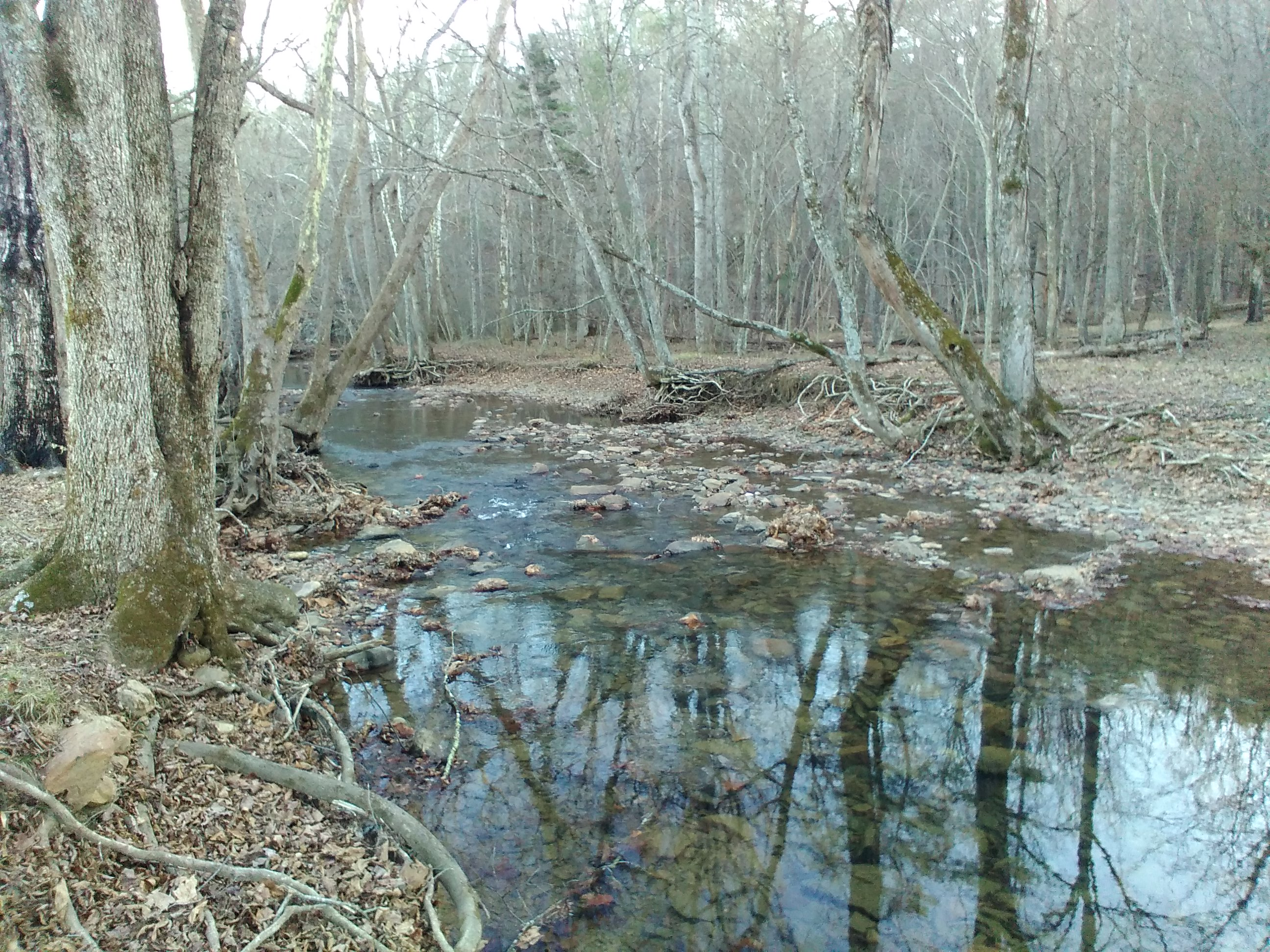
Upper Craig Creek, Montgomery County Virginia near Caldwell Fields

Craig Creek rises in Montgomery County, Virginia, 4 miles (6 km) northwest of Blacksburg, in a valley between the parallel long ridges of Brush Mountain and Sinking Creek Mountain. It flows northeast into Craig County, passing the village of Webbs Mill. Turning north, the creek passes the town of New Castle at the eastern end of Sinking Creek Mountain, then continues generally northeast, though making continuous large incised meanders, into Botetourt County, where it joins the James River just upstream from the town of Eagle Rock.

== See also ==
- List of rivers of Virginia
- Craig Creek Fish
- Craig Creek Recreation Area
- Current conditions
- Water data dashboard
