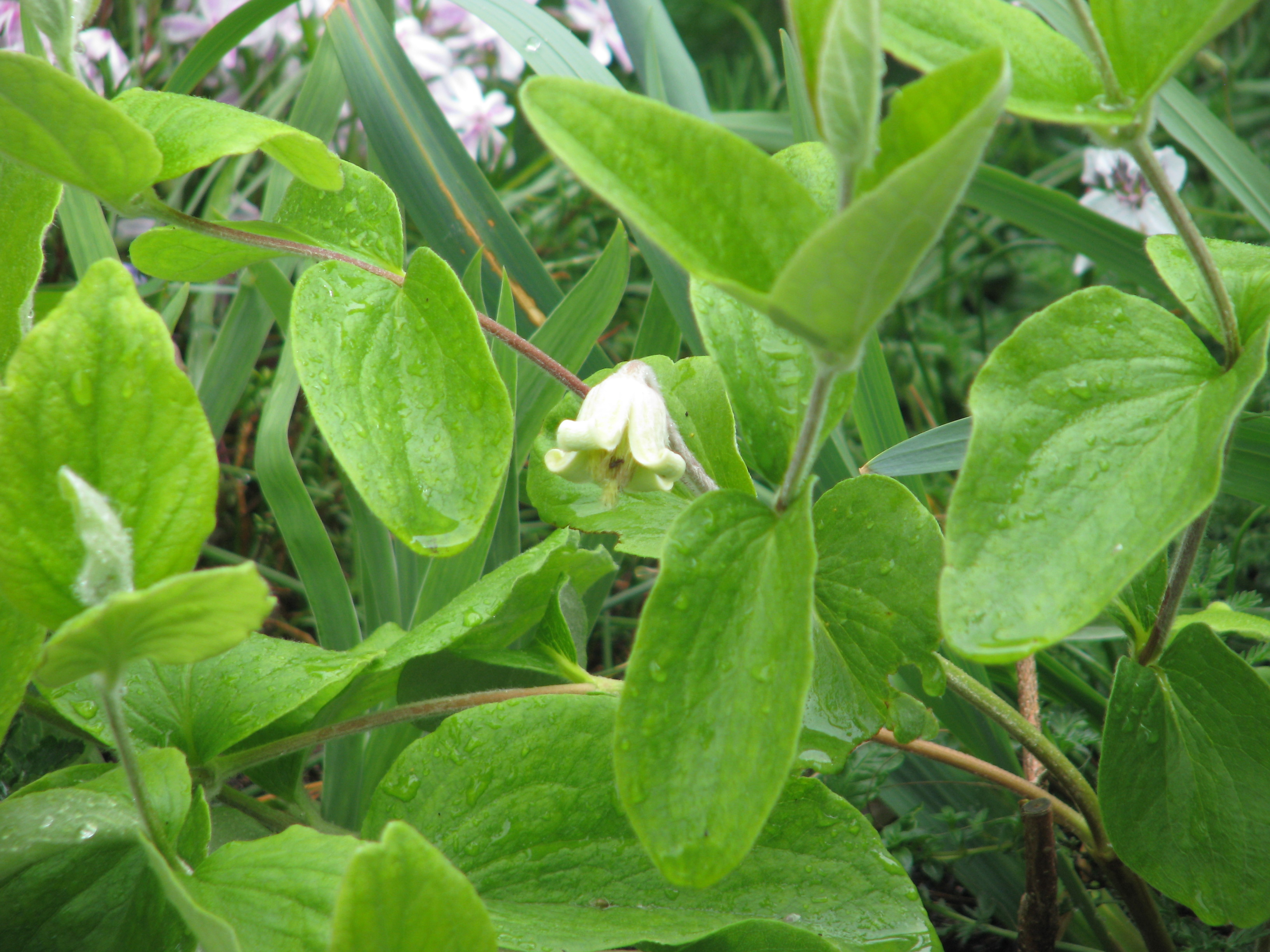
- Clematis coactilis

Scientific classification
- Kingdom: Plantae
- Clade: Tracheophytes
- Clade: Angiosperms
- Clade: Eudicots
- Order: Ranunculales
- Family: Ranunculaceae
- Genus: Clematis
- Species: C. coactilis

Binomial name
- Clematis coactilis (Fernald) Keener

Synonyms
- Clematis albicoma var. coactilis Fernald

= Clematis coactilis =

Virginia white-hair leather flower

Species of flowering plant in the buttercup family

Clematis coactilis, common name Virginia white-hair leather flower, is a plant species endemic to the western part of the US State of Virginia. It is reported from only Botetourt, Roanoke, Craig, Montgomery, Giles, Wythe, and Pulaski Counties. It is usually found on soils formed from shale, less often dolomite, limestone or sandstone.

Clematis coactilis is a shrub, not a vine like many of the other members of the genus. It is erect, up to 45 cm (18 in) tall with silky, bristly or woolly hairs. Leaves are thick and leathery, simple but sometimes lobed, up to 12 cm (4.7 in) long. Flowers are bell-shaped, borne one at a time at the tips of branches, pale yellow sometimes with a purplish tinge. Achenes are hairy, with a feathery beak up to 6 cm (2.4 in) long.
