= New Castle, Virginia =

- Town
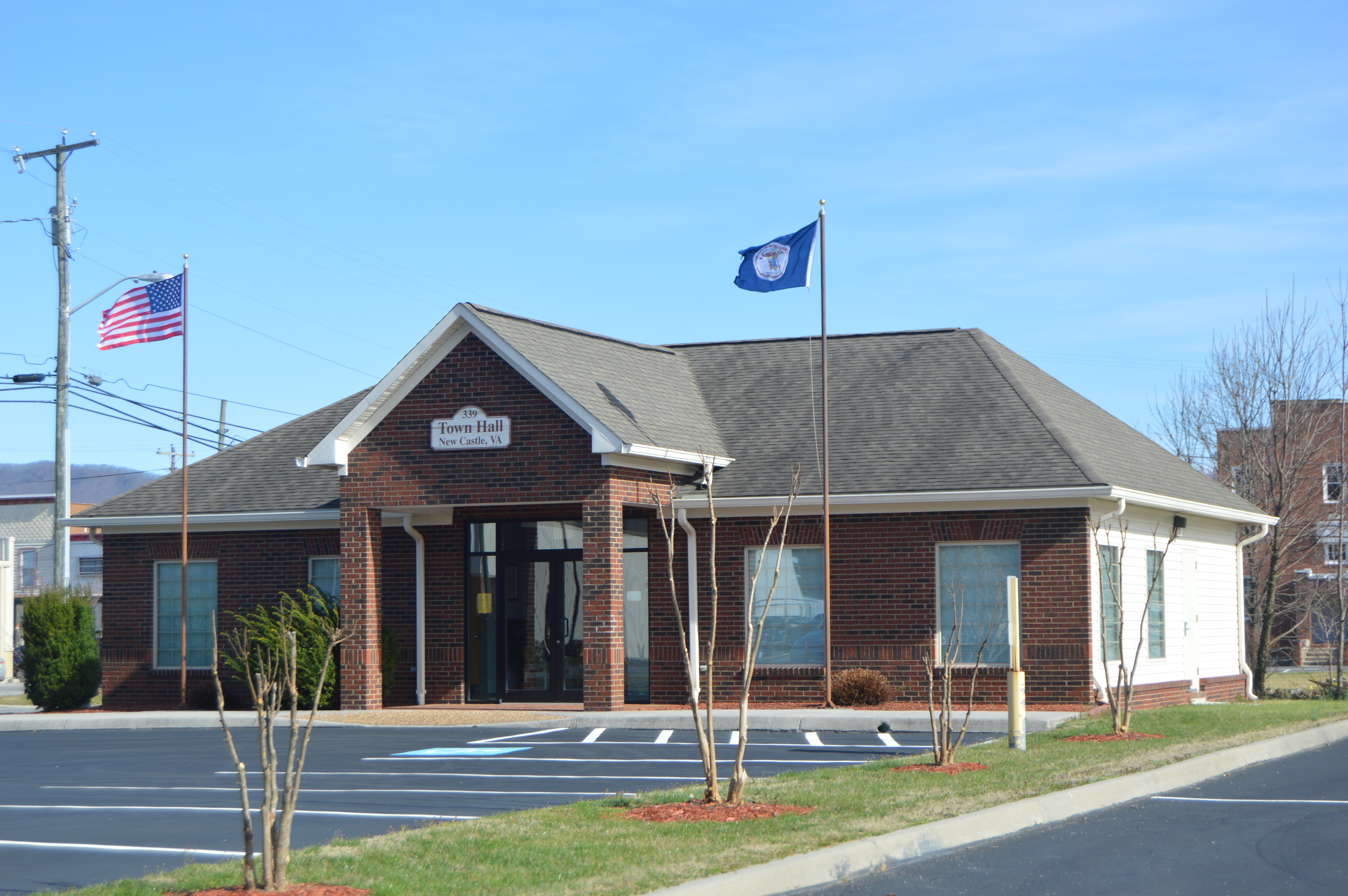
- Town hall

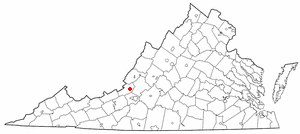
- Location of New Castle, Virginia
- Coordinates: 37°30′3″N 80°6′39″W
- Country: United States
- State: Virginia
- County: Craig

Area
  - Total: 0.17 sq mi (0.44 km^{2})
  - Land: 0.17 sq mi (0.44 km^{2})
  - Water: 0.00 sq mi (0 km^{2})
- Elevation: 1,352 ft (412 m)

Population (2020)
  - Total: 125
  - Density: 927.27/sq mi (358.02/km^{2})
- Time zone: UTC-5 (Eastern (EST))
  - Summer (DST): UTC-4 (EDT)
- ZIP code: 24127
- Area code: 540
- FIPS code: 51-55592
- GNIS feature ID: 1498522
- Website: www.craigcountyva.gov/167/Town-of-New-Castle

New Castle (historically spelled as one word; "Newcastle") is the only town in Craig County, Virginia, United States. The population was 125 at the 2020 census. It is the county seat of Craig County.

The junctions of State Route 311 and State Route 42 and State Route 311 and State Route 615 are in New Castle.

New Castle is part of the Roanoke metropolitan area.

== Geography ==
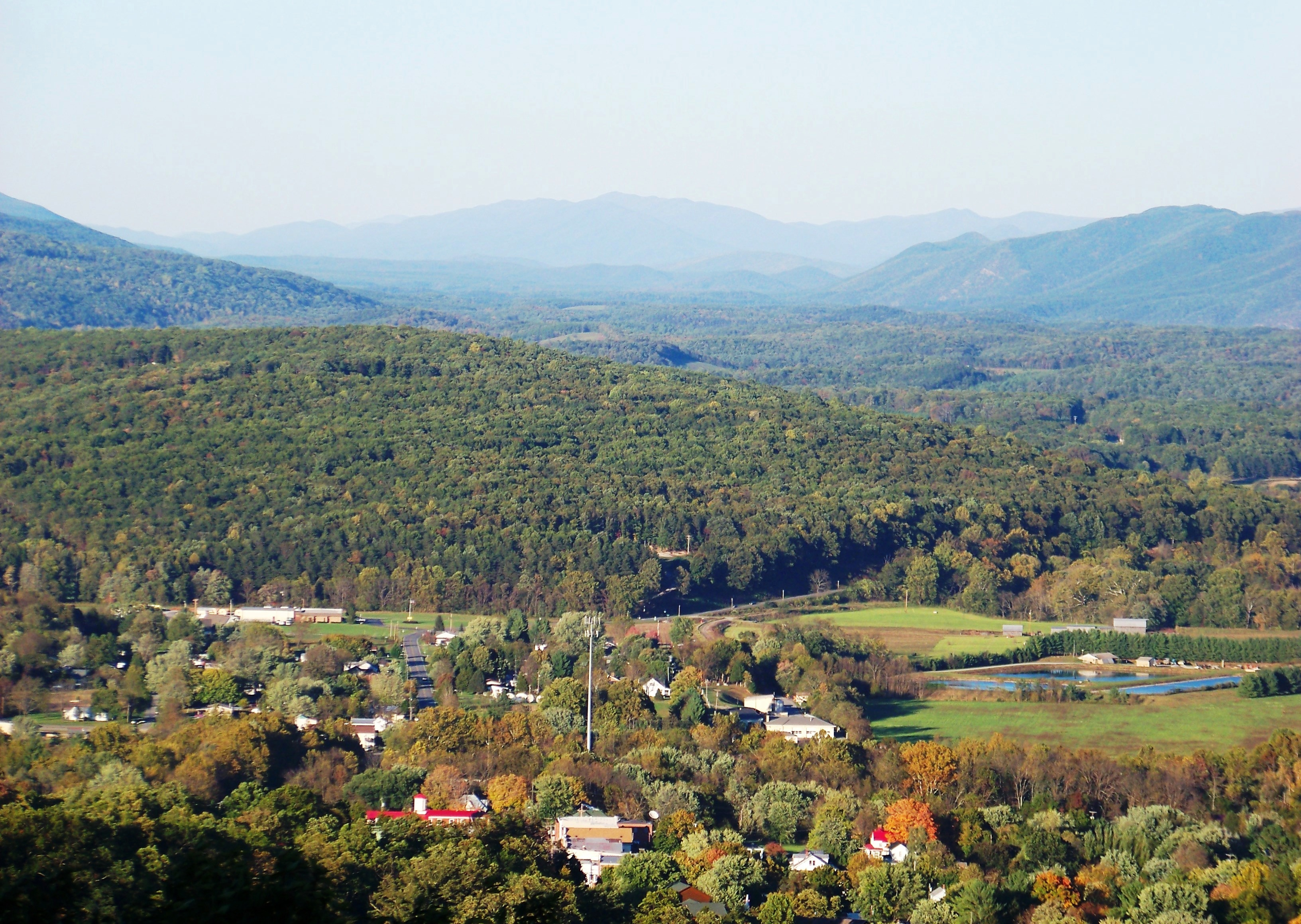
A view over New Castle to the mountains

New Castle is located at 37°30′3″N 80°6′39″W (37.500746, -80.110798).

According to the United States Census Bureau, the town has a total area of 0.2 square mile (0.4 km^{2}), all land.

Two notable geophysical features of the town are the high cliffs just west of the city (which keeps the New River watershed flowing north away from New Castle) and Johns Creek gorge featuring some challenging whitewater (James River watershed). Due to an old land charter however, paddling Johns Creek was disputed as trespassing by the landowner, recent court rulings have opened the run up once again.

The town is just north of the Sinking Creek Valley Cluster, west of the Craig Creek Cluster, and south of the Barbours Creek-Shawvers Run Cluster; areas in the Jefferson National Forest designated by the Wilderness Society as containing "Mountain Treasures".

=== Climate ===
Climate data for New Castle, VA (1991-2020 precipitation normals)
Month	Jan	Feb	Mar	Apr	May	Jun	Jul	Aug	Sep	Oct	Nov	Dec	Year
Average precipitation inches	3.21	2.82	3.56	3.89	4.66	4.37	4.32	3.54	3.74	3.45	2.78	3.48	43.82
Average precipitation mm	82	72	90	99	118	111	110	90	95	88	71	88	1,114
Source: NOAA

== Demographics ==
Historical population
Census	Pop.	Note	%±
1860	225		—
1870	199		−11.6%
1880	182		−8.5%
1890	214		17.6%
1900	299		39.7%
1920	702		—
1930	259		−63.1%
1940	253		−2.3%
1950	239		−5.5%
1960	200		−16.3%
1970	225		12.5%
1980	213		−5.3%
1990	152		−28.6%
2000	179		17.8%
2010	153		−14.5%
2020	125		−18.3%

As of the census of 2000, there were 179 people, 85 households, and 51 families living in the town. The population density was 1,105.0 people per square mile (432.0/km^{2}). There were 93 housing units at an average density of 574.1 per square mile (224.4/km^{2}). The racial makeup of the town was 100.00% White.

There were 85 households, out of which 23.5% had children under the age of 18 living with them, 47.1% were married couples living together, 10.6% had a female householder with no husband present, and 40.0% were non-families. 36.5% of all households were made up of individuals, and 9.4% had someone living alone who was 65 years of age or older. The average household size was 2.11 and the average family size was 2.73.

In the town, the population was spread out, with 22.9% under the age of 18, 12.3% from 18 to 24, 23.5% from 25 to 44, 25.1% from 45 to 64, and 16.2% who were 65 years of age or older. The median age was 37 years. For every 100 females there were 82.7 males. For every 100 females aged 18 and over, there were 91.7 males.

The median income for a household in the town was $26,250, and the median income for a family was $35,750. Males had a median income of $25,625 versus $19,583 for females. The per capita income for the town was $14,119. About 20.4% of families and 17.2% of the population were below the poverty line, including 28.2% of those under the age of eighteen and 6.1% of those sixty-five or over.
