= Peters Mountain Wilderness =

Wilderness area in Virginia, United States

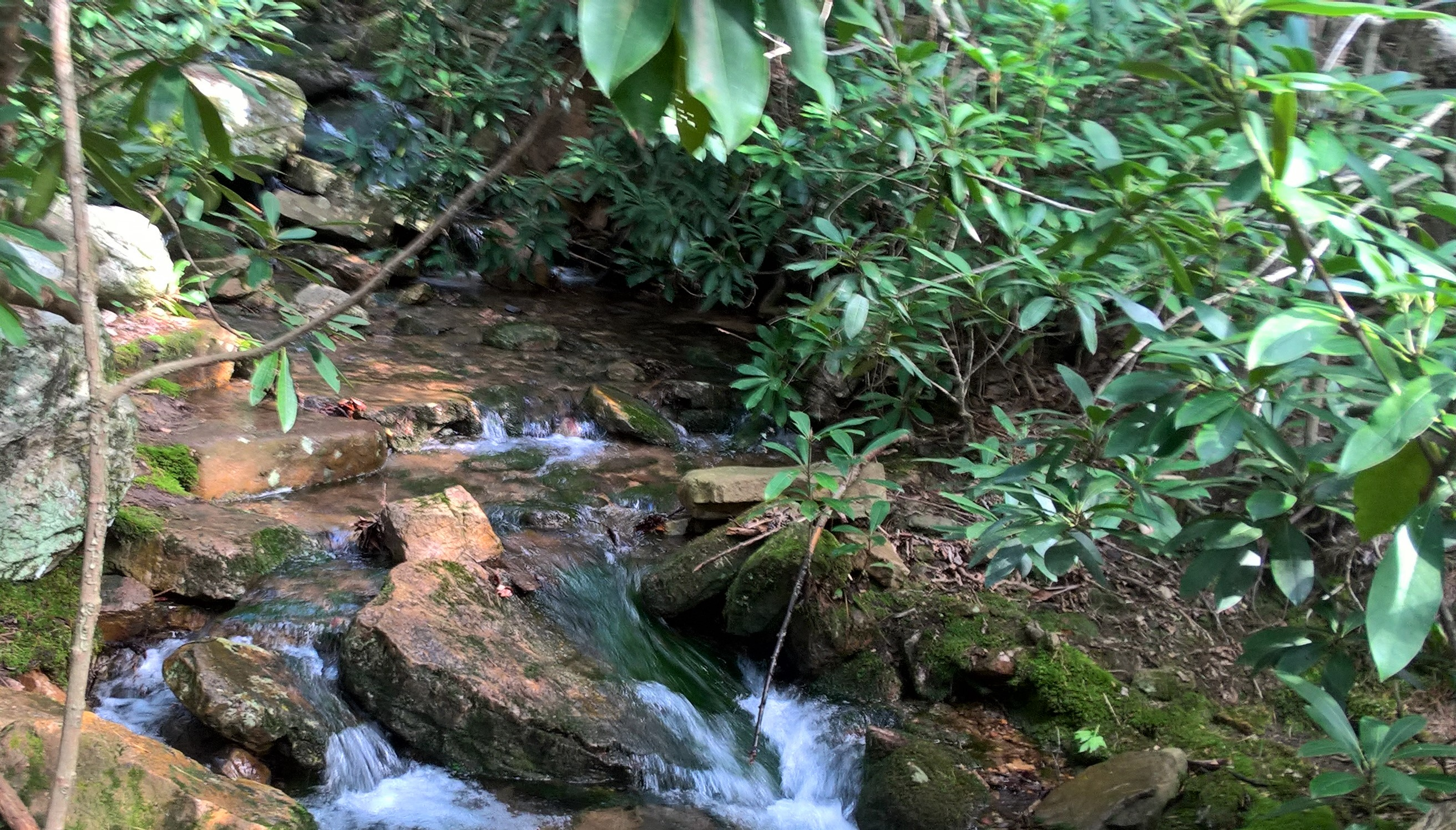
- Swamp Branch in Peters Mountain Wilderness

- Location within Virginia
- Location: Giles County, Virginia, United States
- Coordinates: 37°25′59″N 80°37′21″W
- Area: 4,531 acres (18.34 km^{2})
- Established: 1984
- Operator: George Washington and Jefferson National Forests

The Peters Mountain Wilderness is an area protected by act of Congress to maintain its present, natural condition. As part of the wilderness system. it helps to preserve a variety of natural life forms and contributes to a diversity of plant and animal gene pools. Over half of the ecosystems in the United States exist within designated wilderness.

The ridge of Peters Mountain offers excellent vantage points overlooking the hills of West Virginia, and the area includes interesting bogs and mountain outcrops. The deep forests are occupied by the northern saw whet owl and many species of warblers. The mountain is home of the rare Peters Mountain Mallow.

The area is part of the Mountain Lake Wilderness Cluster.

== Location and access ==
Map of Peters Mountain Wilderness Area, 1984

The area is located on Peters Mountain in the Jefferson National Forest, about 10 miles north of Pearisburg, Virginia. The Appalachian National Scenic Trail travels about 1.5 miles through the middle of the area. The section of the Appalachian Trail passing through the wilderness can be reached by following the Appalachian Trail south from the trail head at Stony Creek or going north from the trail head at the New River.

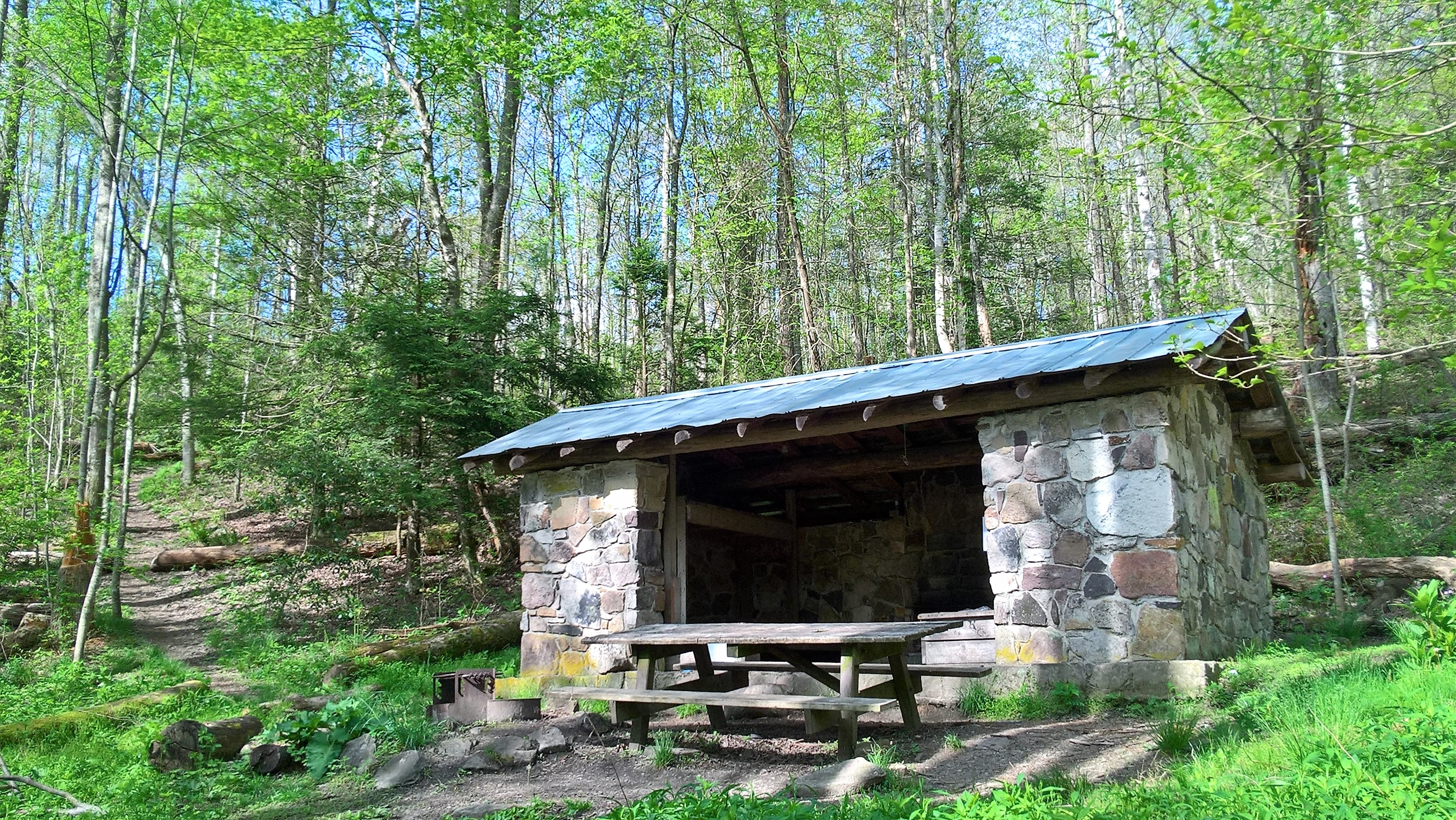
Pine Swamp Shelter on Appalachian Trail

Besides the Appalachian Trail, there are several other trails in the area. These include the Allegheny Trail extending along the ridge of Peters Mountain, and the Ground Hog Trail, a 2-mile blue-blazed trail that begins at Painters Run Road (Rt. 657) off of Route 219 in West Virginia. Trail information is available on National Geographic-Trails Illustrated Map #787 (Blacksburg-New River Valley).

== Natural history ==
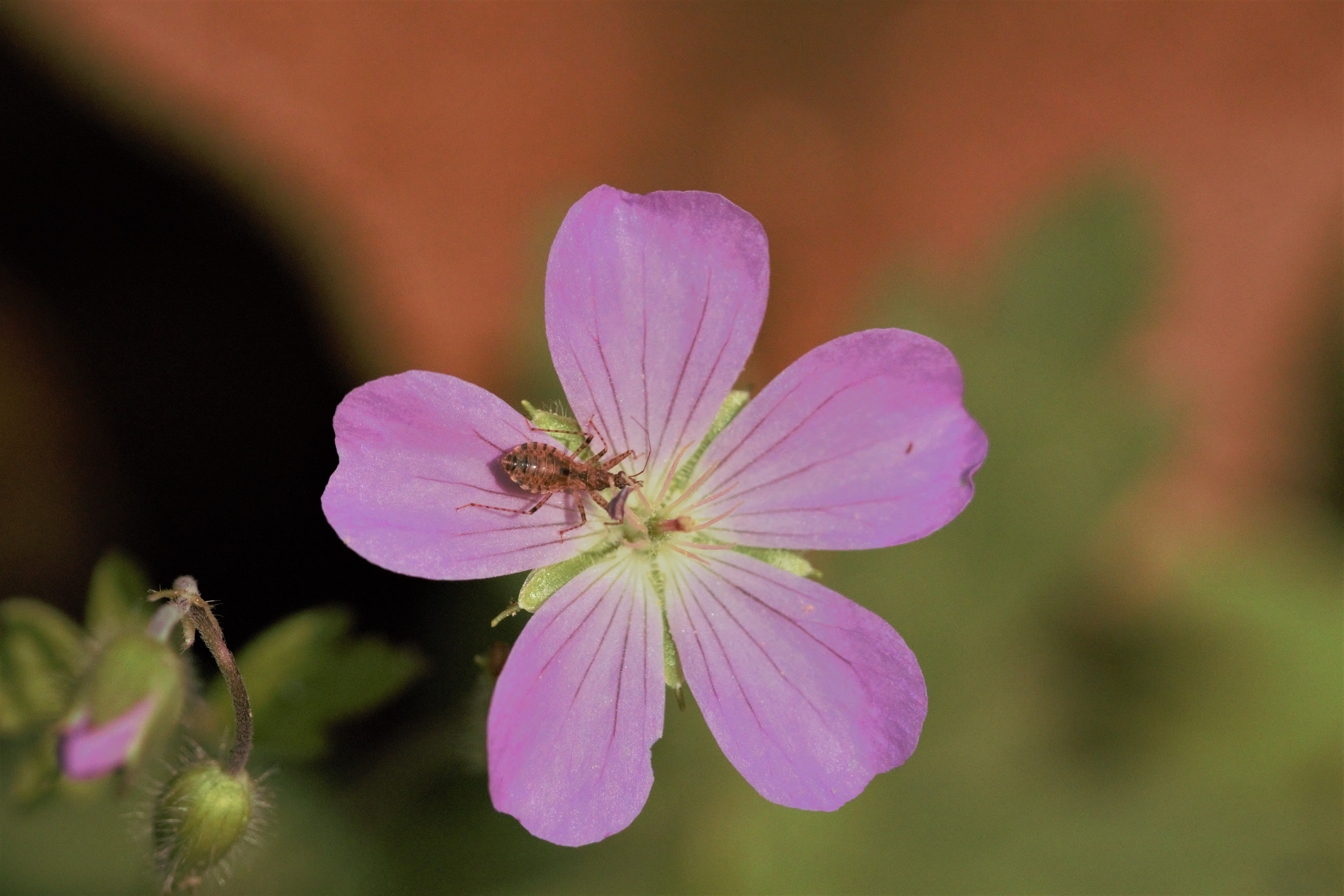
Wild Geranium in Peters Mountain Wilderness

Vegetation in the wilderness is primarily upland oak with yellow poplar, red oak, and hickory with at least three tracts of old growth forest. There are numerous sandstone outcroppings along the crest of the mountain and a number of high mountain bogs on Pine Swamp Ridge. Peters Mountain Mallow, one of the rarest plants in the United States, is unique to the mountain. It is protected in a 398-acre preserve purchased by the Nature Conservancy of Virginia that is located just outside of the wilderness area.

Peters Mountain mallow was discovered in 1927 by botanists who found 50 specimens. The plant was placed on the endangered species list in 1986 when a survey crew found only four specimens. In order to sprout, dormant seeds require fire to crack open and let water in. Cores from nearby trees showed that no fires had burned in the area for two decades. After a small blaze was lit in 1992 a few mallows sprouted. and later 500 seedlings were found.

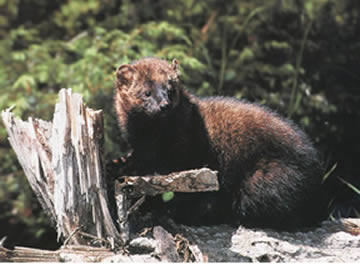
Fisher

In 1849 John James Audubon and John Bachman found a fisher on Peters Mountain, just south of Peterstown, West Virginia. The fisher is a secretive, dark-colored mammal that once ranged as far south as the Appalachian Mountains of North Carolina. The fisher is no longer found in this area, but it has been introduced in parts of West Virginia and could return to the wild habitat provided by the Peters Mountain Wilderness.

Stony Creek contains the colorful candy darter, an imperiled fish found in only a few tributaries of the New River.

A bog at the head of Pine Branch Swamp near the crest of Peters Mountain contains cinnamon fern, sphagnum moss and sundew. Loggers last cut the area in the 1920s and 1930s leaving a 10-acre stand of old-growth hemlocks.

== Topography ==
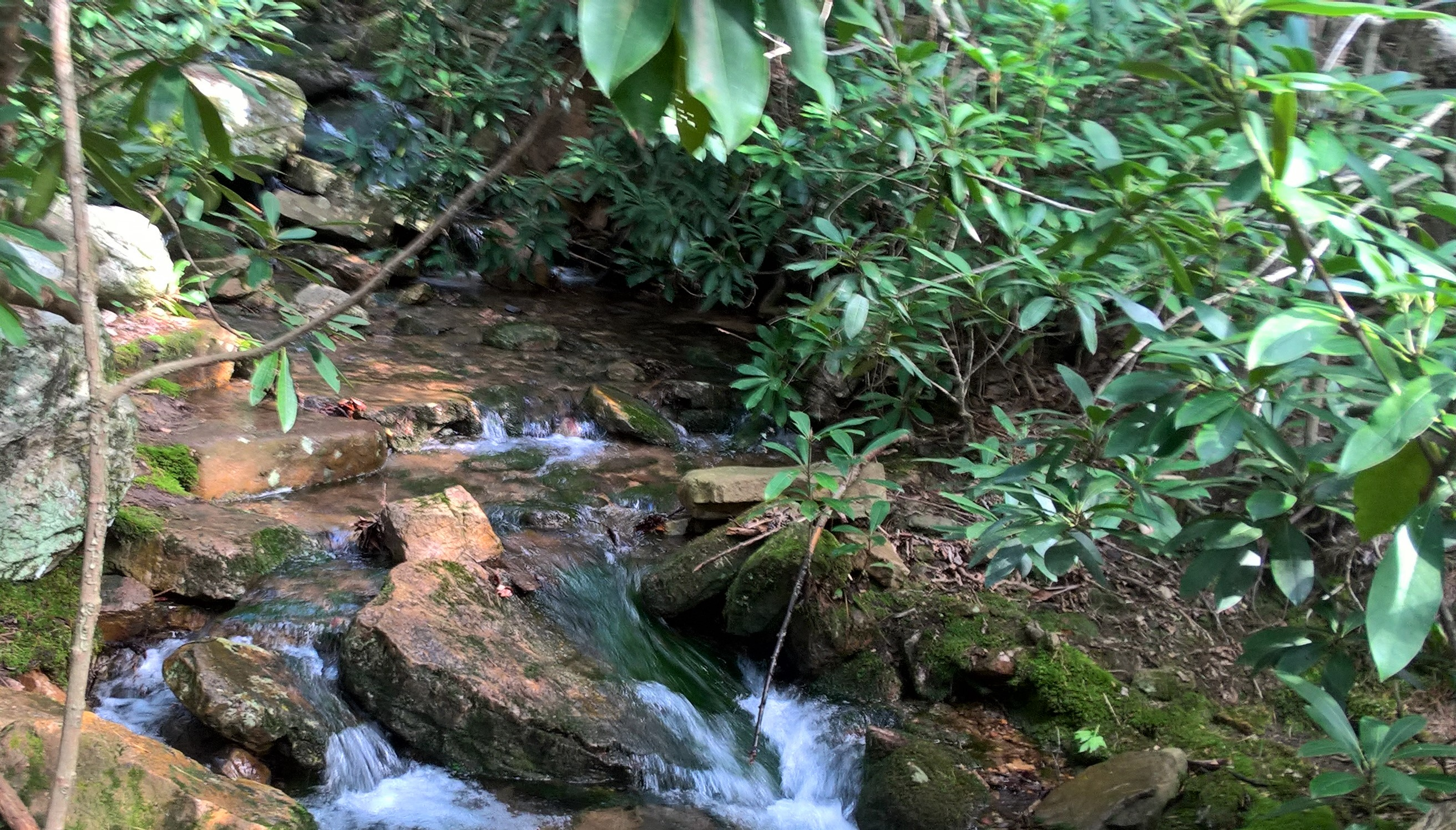
Pine Swamp Branch in Peters Mountain Wilderness

Peters Mountain straddles the Virginia - West Virginia state line. It is a long, rugged ridge extending from the New River on the South, through Monroe County, West Virginia and into Alleghany County, Virginia. The elevation ranges from about 2000 feet near the southern boundary on Big Stony Creek to 3956 feet on the ridge near Pine Swamp Ridge. The northern boundary of the wilderness is the ridge of Peters Mountain. Pine Swamp Ridge defines the central region of Peters Mountain and marks the watershed between Pine Swamp Branch and Dismal Branch. Foster Knob is a mid-slope outlier with good views down Stony Creek. The ridge crest is capped with weather resistant sandstone with many rock outcrops.

Dismal Creek and Pine Swamp Branch are two small creeks in the area that drain into Stony Creek.

== Management ==
This wilderness was designated by congress in 1984 and is managed by the Forest Service. There are some regulations to maintain the integrity of the area. For example, motorized equipment, motor vehicles and mountain bikes are prohibited, group size is limited to ten people, and limits are placed on camping.

Further information can be obtained from the Eastern Divide Ranger District, 110 SouthPark Drive, Blacksburg, Va 24060, phone 540-552-4641, website

== Nearby Wildlands ==
The Peters Mountain Wilderness is in the Mountain Lake Wilderness Cluster. Other areas in the cluster are:

- Mountain Lake Wilderness
- Cascades (conservation area)
- Mottesheard
- Hickory Flats

== See also ==
- Wilderness
- Eastern Wilderness Act
- Mountain Lake Wilderness Cluster
- Mill Creek (conservation area)
