= Allegheny =

Allegheny, Alleghany or Allegany may refer to:

== Places ==
=== Geologic and geographic features ===
- Allegheny River, in Pennsylvania and New York
- Allegheny Mountains, part of the Appalachian Mountain Range in West Virginia, Pennsylvania, Maryland and Virginia
  - Allegheny Mountain (Pennsylvania), major mountain ridge in the northern part of the Allegheny Mountains
  - Little Allegheny Mountain, in Pennsylvania and Maryland; see list of mountains of the Alleghenies
  - Allegheny Mountain (West Virginia–Virginia), major mountain ridge in the southern part of the Allegheny Mountains
  - Back Allegheny Mountain, in West Virginia
- Allegheny Plateau, which terminates in the east at the Allegheny Mountains
- Allegheny Front, the escarpment delineating the eastern edge of the Allegheny Plateau
- Allegheny Formation, a mapped bedrock unit of West Virginia, Maryland and Pennsylvania

=== Counties ===
- Allegany County, Maryland
- Allegany County, New York
- Alleghany County, North Carolina
- Alleghany County, Virginia
- Allegheny County, Pennsylvania

=== Communities and townships ===
- Alleghany, California, unincorporated community in Sierra County
- Allegheny, Kentucky
- Allegheny, Pennsylvania, a city annexed by the city of Pittsburgh in 1907
- Allegheny Township, Blair County, Pennsylvania
- Allegheny Township, Butler County, Pennsylvania
- Allegheny Township, Cambria County, Pennsylvania
- Allegheny Township, Somerset County, Pennsylvania
- Allegheny Township, Venango County, Pennsylvania
- Allegheny Township, Westmoreland County, Pennsylvania
- Allegany, Cattaragus County, New York
  - Allegany, a village in the above town
- Allegany, Oregon, an unincorporated community in Coos County
- Allegany Township, Pennsylvania

=== Protected areas ===
- Allegheny National Forest, Pennsylvania
- Allegheny National Recreation Area, Pennsylvania
- Allegheny Wildlife Management Area, in Mineral County, West Virginia
- High Allegheny National Park and Preserve, a proposed NPS unit in West Virginia

=== Man-made features ===
- Allegheny Cabin (Rohrbaugh Cabin), historic structure in eastern West Virginia
- Allegheny Observatory, at the University of Pittsburgh
- Allegheny Mountain Tunnel, a vehicular tunnel on the Pennsylvania Turnpike
- Allegheny Reservoir, a reservoir on the Allegheny River
- Allegheny River Tunnel, a light rail tunnel under the Allegheny River in Pittsburgh
- Trans-Allegheny Lunatic Asylum, a former psychiatric hospital turned tourist attraction in West Virginia

=== Trails ===
- Allegheny Trail, a hiking trail in West Virginia
- Great Allegheny Passage including parts in Maryland and Pennsylvania
- Allegheny Highlands Trail of Maryland, a rail trail

== Rail ==
- Allegheny (train), a passenger train operated by the Pennsylvania Railroad
- Allegheny Railroad, a railroad operating in northwestern Pennsylvania (1985–92)
- Allegheny station (disambiguation), stations of the name
- Allegheny Valley Railroad (disambiguation), railroads of that name
- Allegheny Valley Street Railway, an electric rail line operating along the Allegheny River (1906–37)
- Allegheny class, a class of 2-6-6-6 locomotives

== Organizations ==
- Alleghany Corp., an insurance holding company
- Allegheny Airlines, a forerunner of US Airways
- Allegheny College, in Meadville, Pennsylvania
- Allegheny Energy, a public utility (including its subsidiary Allegheny Power)
- Allegheny Foundation, a charitable organization focused on Western Pennsylvania
- Allegheny Mountain Radio, a network of radio stations in West Virginia and Virginia
- Allegheny Technologies, a specialty metals company
- Allegheny (titular see), a Roman Catholic titular see
- Pittsburgh Allegheny (International Association), a nineteenth century minor league baseball team that, at times, played under the name "Allegheny"

== Biology ==
- Pachysandra procumbens or Allegheny pachysandra, a plant in the box family
- Allegheny woodrat, a species of pack rat in the eastern US
- Allegheny Mountain dusky salamander, a species of the eastern US and Canada
- Allegheny mound ant, a species of the eastern US and Canada
- "Allegheny alligator", nickname for the hellbender
- Allegheny chinquapin (Castanea pumila), a species of chestnut

== Other ==
- Allegany Ballistics Laboratory
- Allegany College of Maryland
- Allegany Indian Reservation, Cattaragus County, New York
- Allegany State Park, Cattaragus County, New York

== See also ==
- Allegany (disambiguation)
