= Mountain Lake Wilderness Cluster =

Area in Virginia, United States

- IUCN category VI (protected area with sustainable use of natural resources)
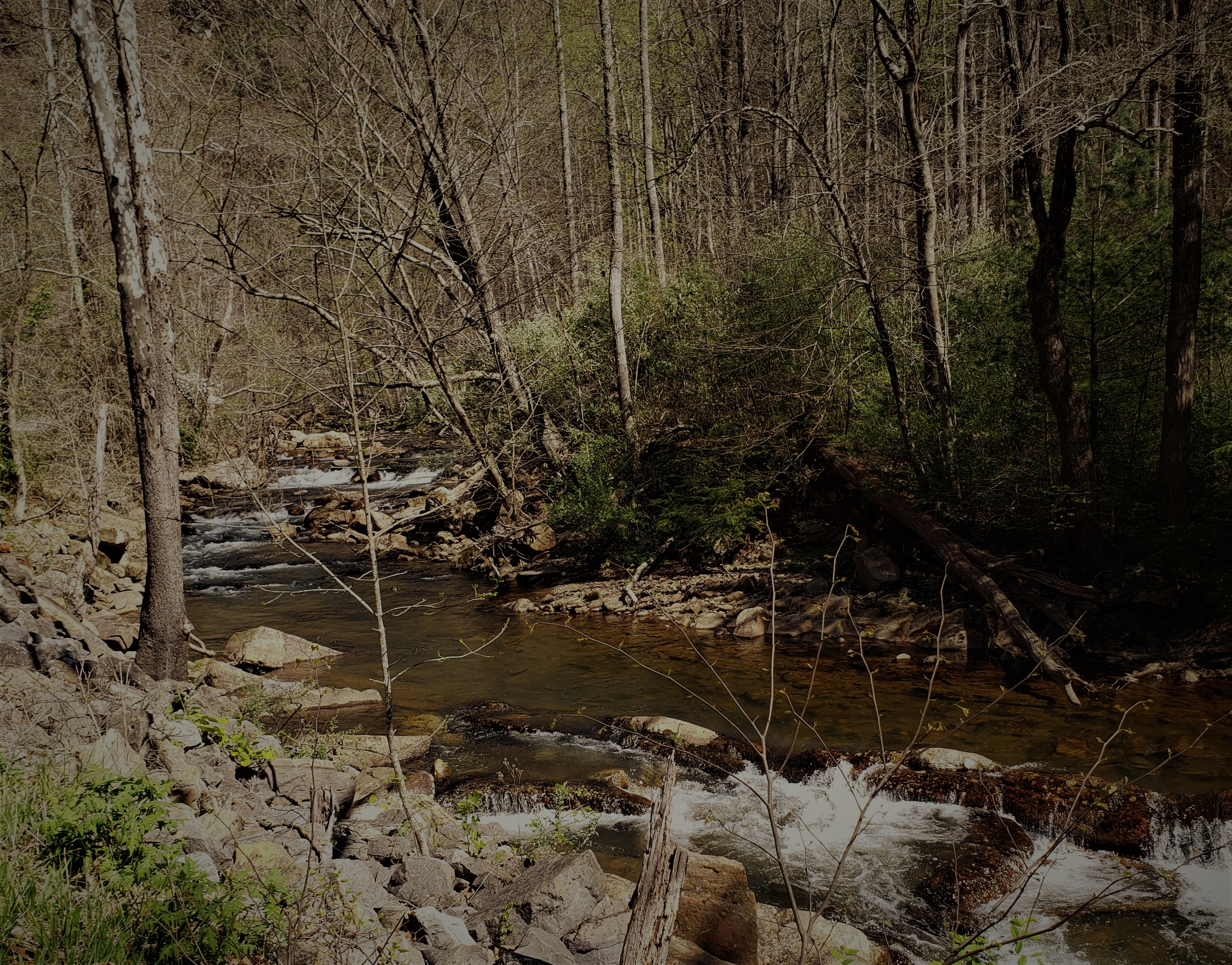
- Stony Creek flowing through Mountain Lake Wilderness Cluster

- Location within Virginia Location within the United States
- Location: Eastern Divide, United States
- Coordinates: 37°21′45″N 80°32′2″W

The Mountain Lake Wilderness Cluster is a region recognized by The Wilderness Society for its unique waterfalls, vistas, trout stream and wildlife habitat. The heart of the region is the Mountain Lake Wilderness, the largest wilderness in the George Washington and Jefferson National Forests. These public lands are enhanced by the presence of private lands which are preserved to maintain their natural integrity. The region includes the Mountain Lake Biological Station that studies distinctive wildlife and ecology of the area.

== Description ==
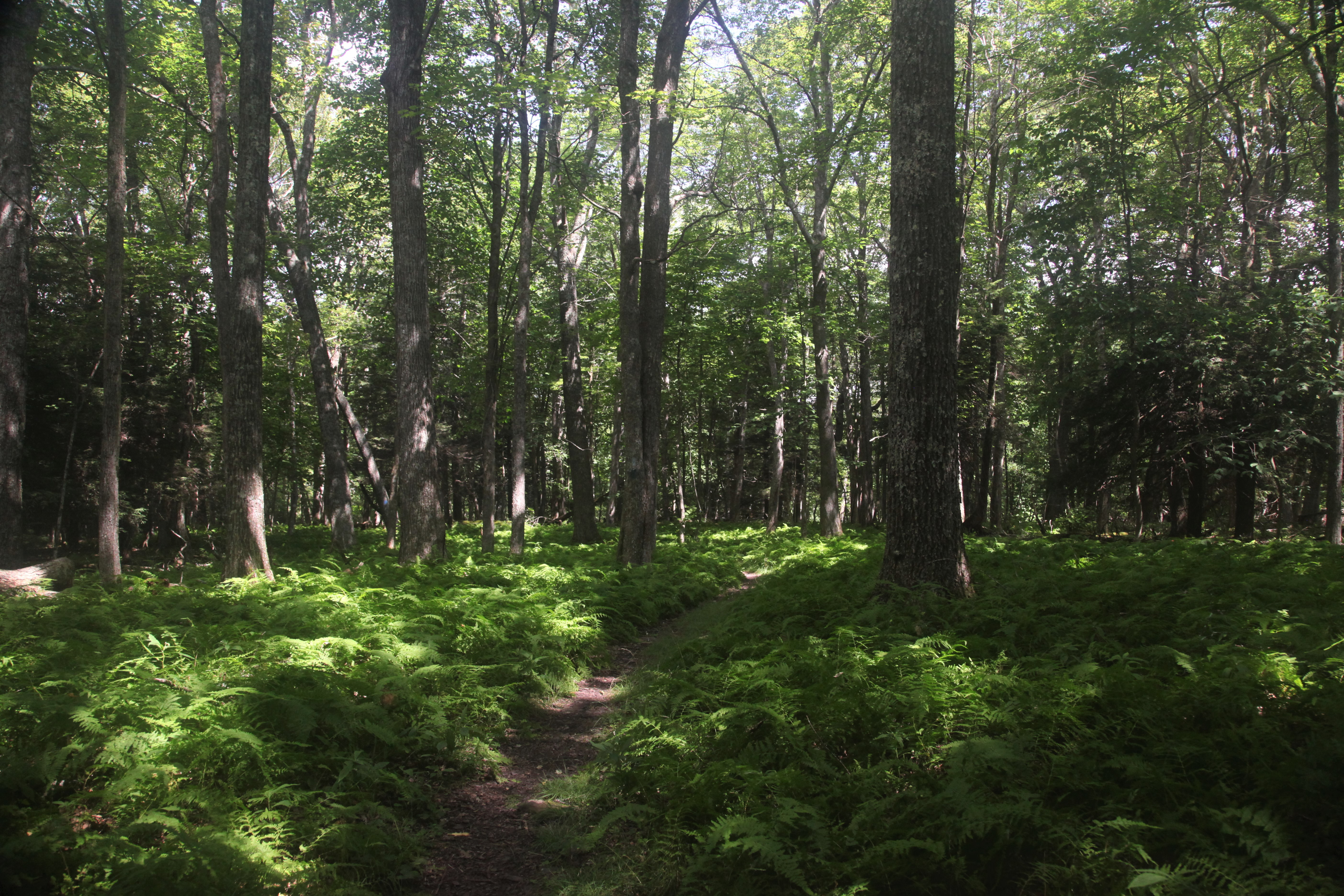
Forest path in Mountain Lake Wilderness Cluster (Virginia), near Va 635

The Mountain Lake Wilderness Cluster contains wildlands under different levels of management. There are wilderness areas protected by Congressional action, inventoried wilderness, areas recognized by Wilderness Society as worthy of protection from timbering and roads, and other forest service land that act as a buffer for the protected areas. These areas are in the Jefferson National Forest. In addition, there are privately owned lands managed to maintain their wild character or serve as an environment for study, and land operated by a non-profit organization, the Mountain Lake Conservancy.

Among the areas included in the Wilderness Cluster are:

- Mountain Lake Wilderness
- Peters Mountain Wilderness
- Hickory Flats
- Mottesheard
- Cascades (Conservation Area)

== Location and access ==
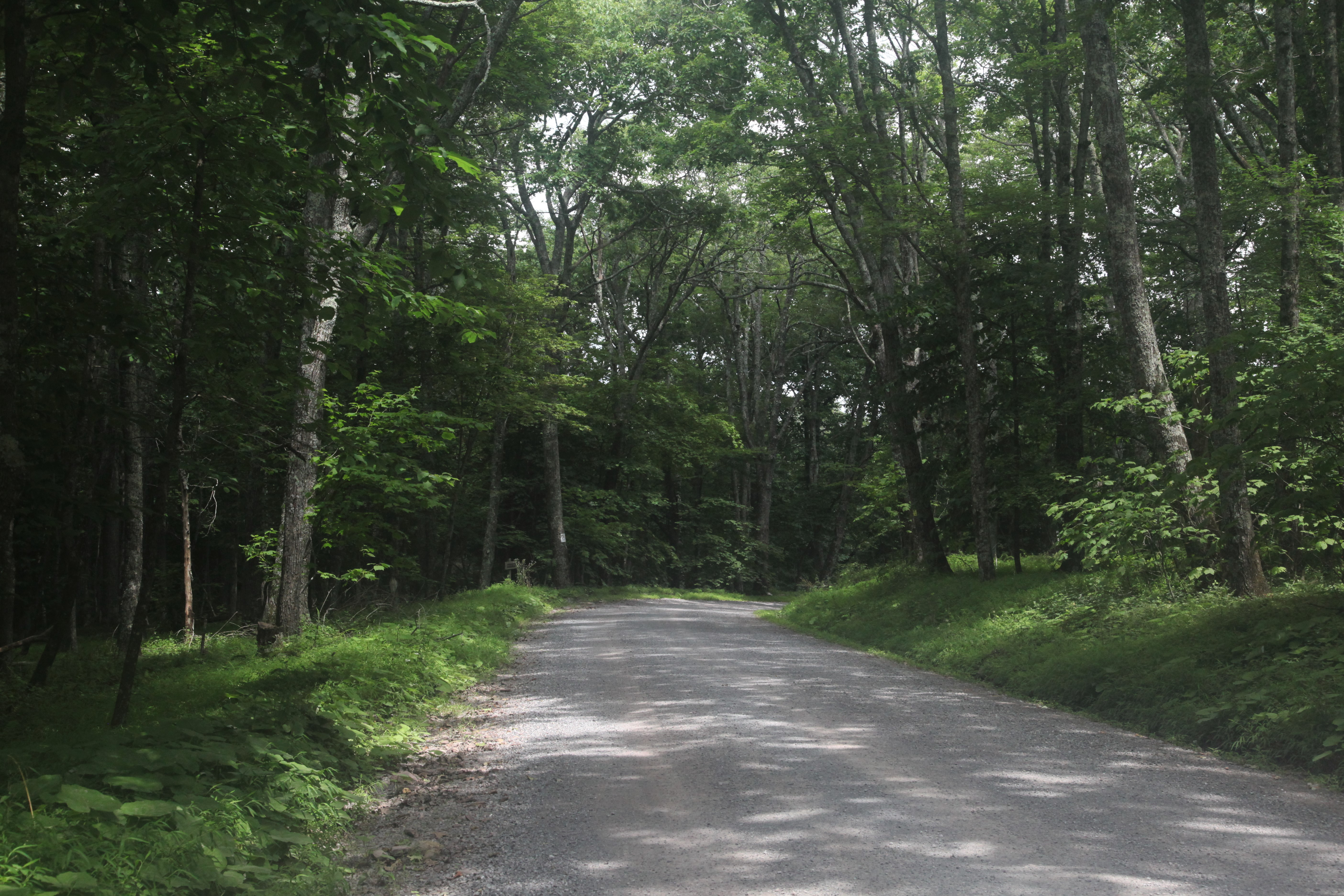
Mountain Lake Road (Va 635) in Mountain Lake Wilderness Cluster (VA)

The Mountain Lake Wilderness Cluster is located in southwestern Virginia, near Pembroke, Virginia. The heart of the area is Mountain Lake, the only natural body of water in western Virginia.

The original route to Mountain Lake was a turnpike completed in 1859 that followed the present VA 700 to the lake. The turnpike continued past the lake, along present VA 613, on the western side of Salt Pond Mountain, crossed Potts Mountain dropping down into the Big Stony Creek watershed, continued to cross over Peters Mountain, passed by Salt Sulphur Springs, West Virginia and finally ended at Union, West Virginia. From there stage coaches took travelers to various springs in the area. Route 700 still serves as a good means to reach the lake. A tour through the cluster is obtained by continuing along Va 613 to the point where it begins to ascend Peters Mountain. At this point, the road, called the Salt Sulphur Turnpike, deteriorates as it ascends Peters Mountain. The present condition of the Peters Mountain section is probably similar to the days when it was traveled by stage. The road is now best used by high-clearance 4-wheel drive vehicles, hikers, mountain bikers, and horseback riders.

The Appalachian Trail and the Allegheny Trail pass through the cluster. Access to the Appalachian Trail is gained at road crossings in Johns Creek Road (Va 632), Mountain Lake Road (Va 613), and Big Stony Creek Rd (Va 635). There are no road crossing of the Allegheny Trail, but it can be reached by parking on North Fork Mountain Road (Va 613), then hiking along the old turnpike to reach the trail where it passes along the ridge of Peters Mountain.

There are 18 trails on the land managed by the Mountain Lake Conservancy. A map of trails and a $5 annual permit can be obtained at the Mountain Lake Lodge.

Other roads and trails in the area are shown on National Geographic Trail Map 788.

== Biological significance ==
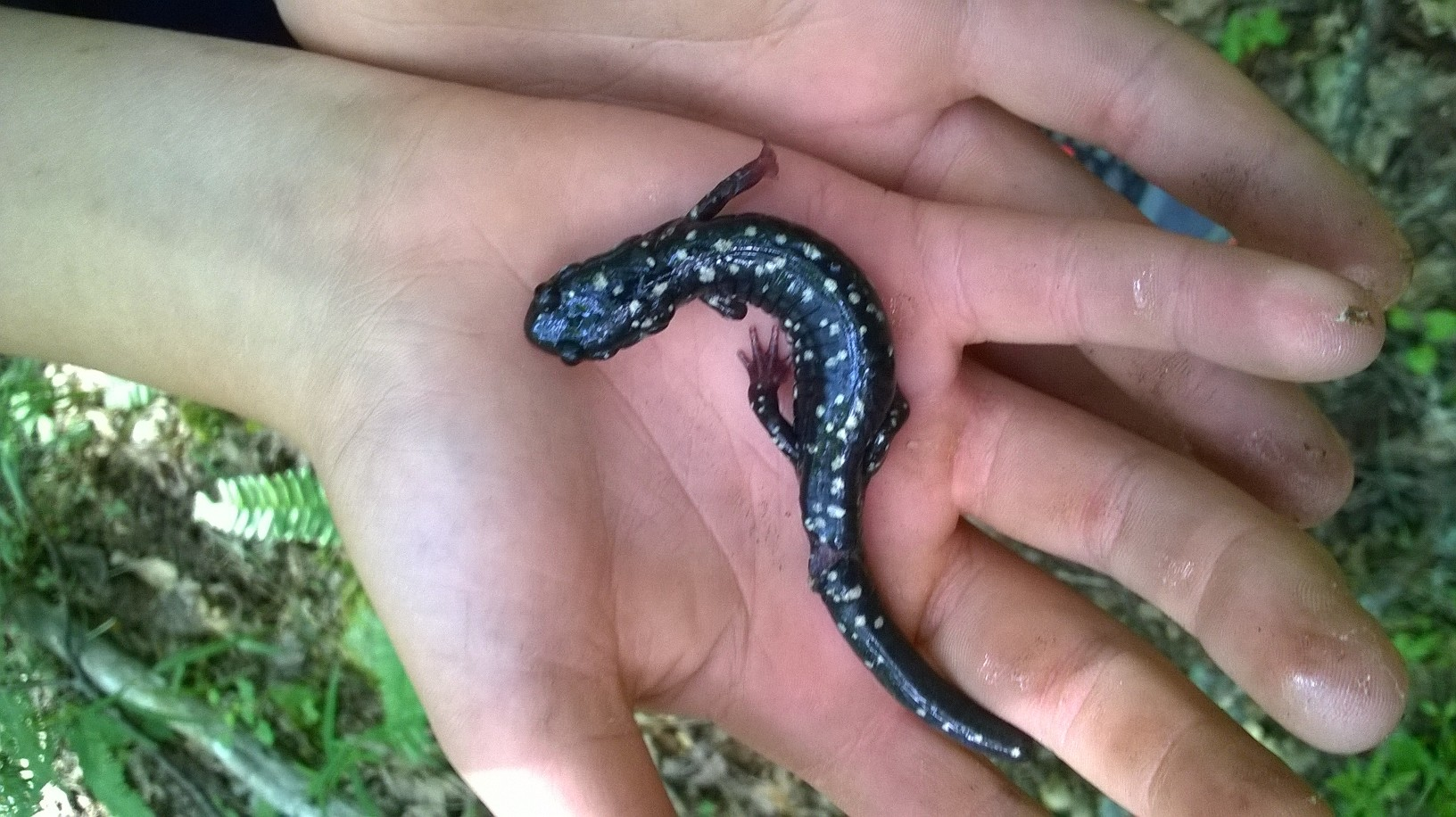
Slimy salamander found near Mountain Lake, Giles County, Virginia

The area contains forested ridges, dominated by oaks and other hardwoods, and cove forests on sheltered slopes, hollows and along stream valleys. These forests provide good habitat for salamanders. The Appalachian Mountains are the home to more salamander species than anywhere else in the world. The area's diverse forests and freshwater ecosystems provide a home to these reptiles that have become adapted to cool highlands. Almost half of all these species are listed as threatened or endangered.

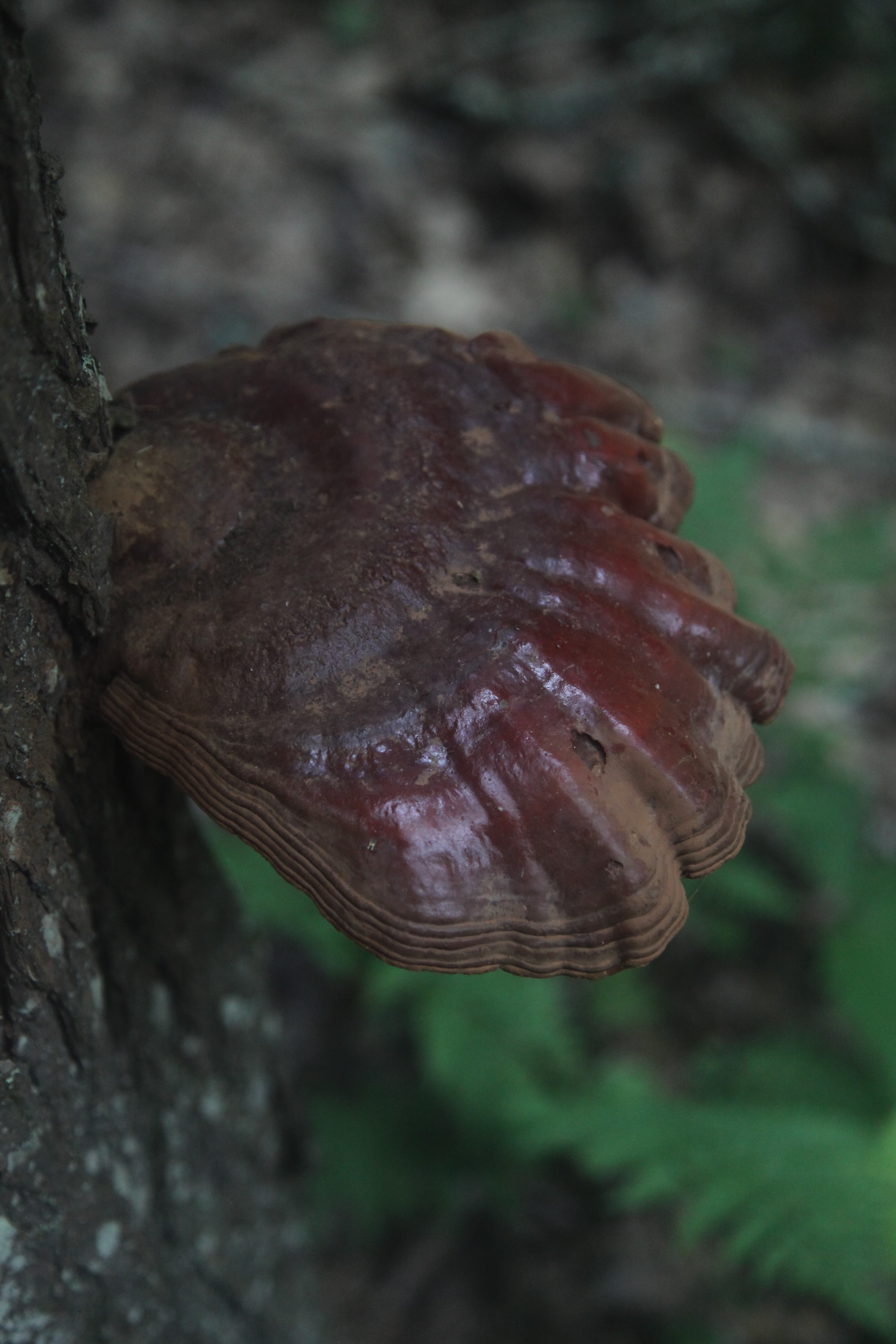
Polypor in Mountain Lake Wilderness Cluster (Virginia), near VA 635

In the early 20th century the forest was dominated by chestnut trees to the extent that the forest was characterized as "oak-chestnut", but by 1930 most of these trees had been infected by chestnut blight. The root system of blight-killed trees still produces sprouts but they do not get much larger than an inch in diameter before succumbing to the blight. A large number of hemlock trees are threatened by the woolly adelgid that arrived in 2000. Efforts are underway to introduce beetle predators known to feed on the woolly adelgid.

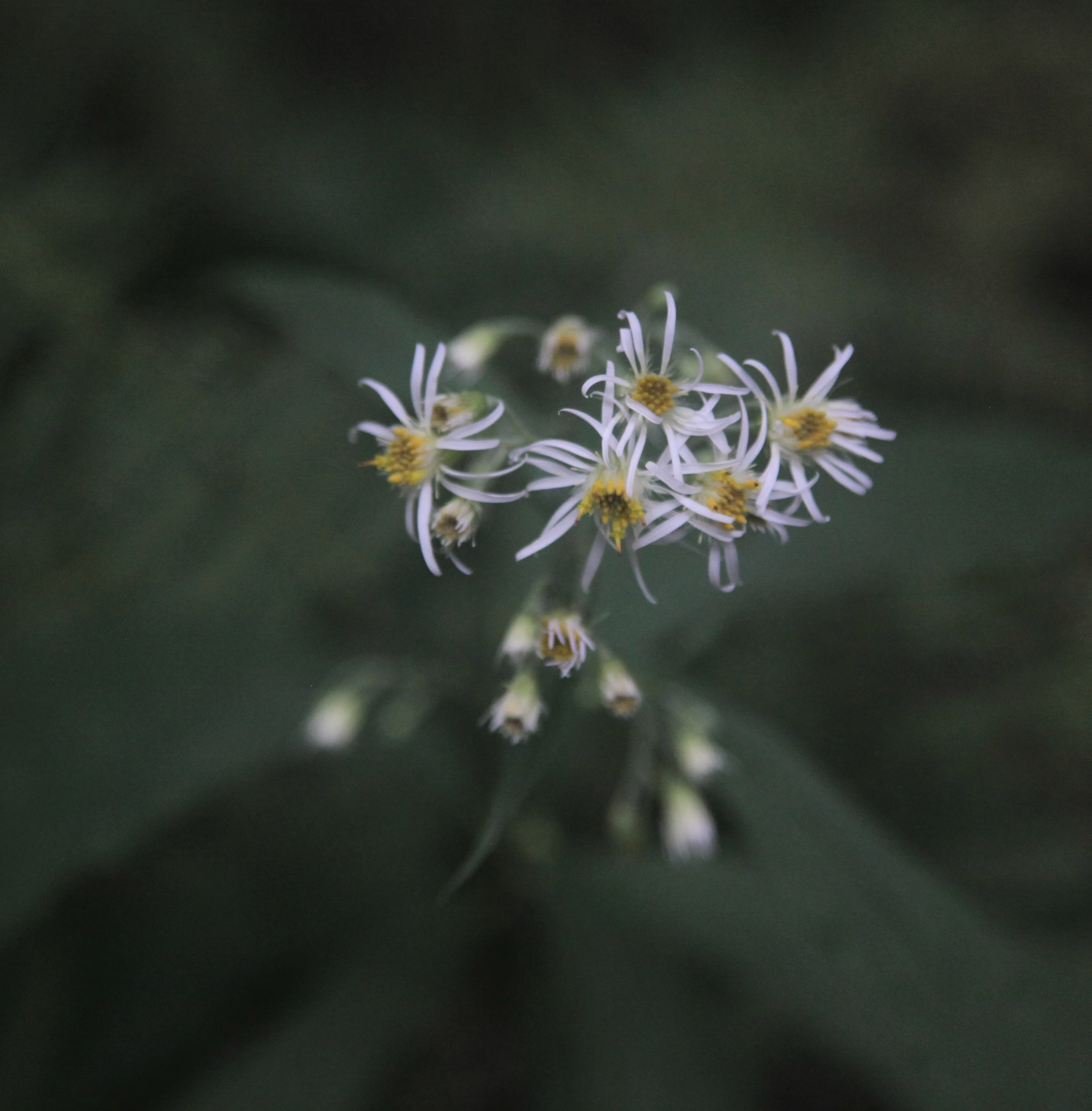
Wildflowers in Mountain Lake Wilderness Cluster (Virginia) near VA 635

The tawny crescent is a butterfly that is considered endangered and has disappeared from much of its former range in the Appalachians. One of the best known populations was at Mountain Lake. It is severely threatened by spraying intended for the control of gypsy moths. Its habitat is not well known, but is considered to prefer steep, dry, sparsely wooded hillsides.

== Geologic history ==
The region is in the Ridge and Valley Province of the Appalachian Mountains. The province consists of a thick layer of sedimentary rock that has undergone folding and/or faulting to create a series of ridges and valleys. During the sedimentation process fossils were formed leaving evidence of life existing millions of years ago. The fossils can be seen in rock exposures throughout the mountains.

== Mountain Lake ==
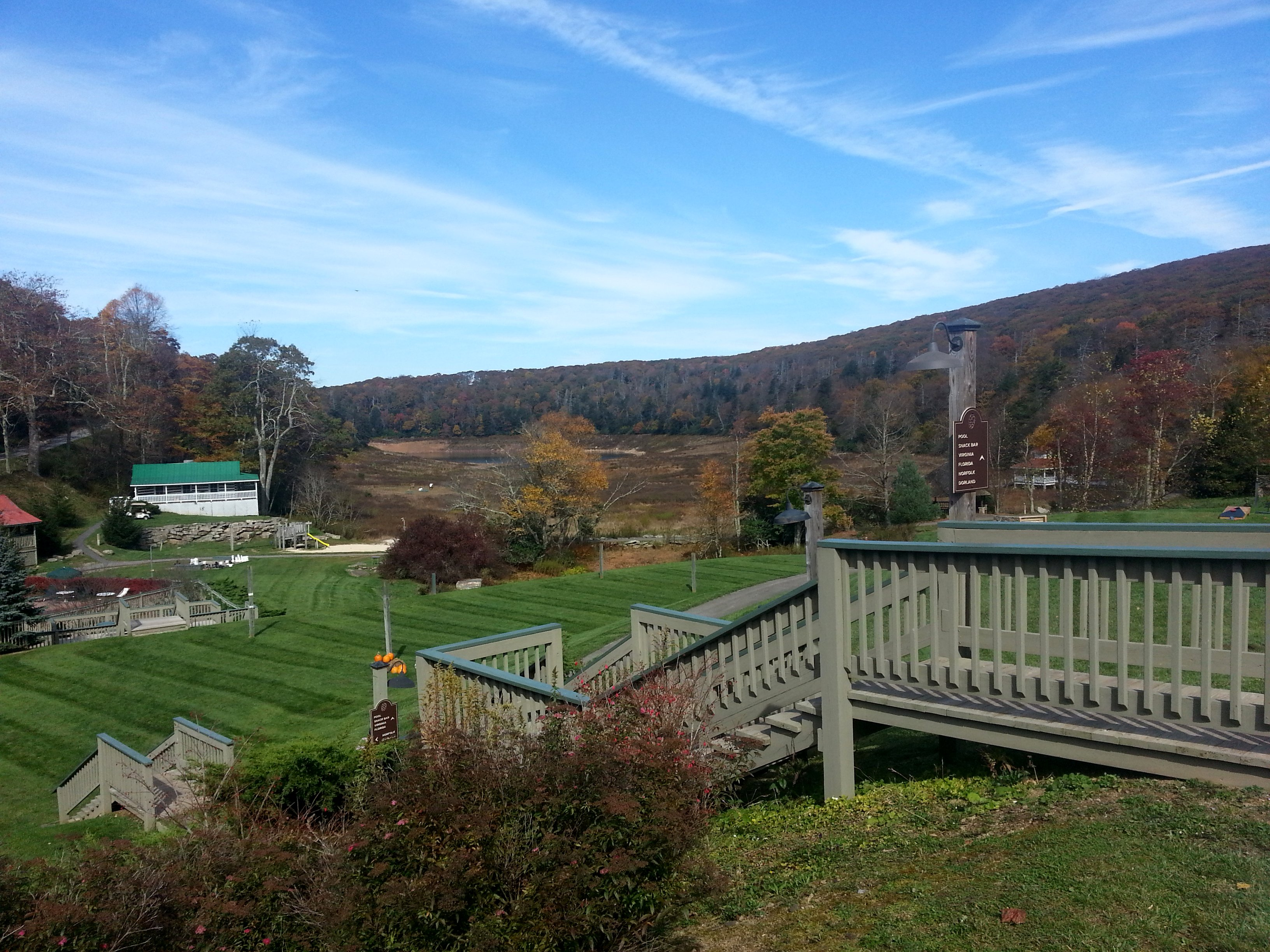
Mountain Lake Virginia lakeview

Mountain Lake has been referred to as "The Silver Gem of the Alleghenies". Many modes of formation have been suggested for the lake. Among the possibilities are the blocking of a stream by talus or slide-rock, a glacial cirque, a depression formed volcanic activity or the result of a meteoric impact. Recent studies have shown that a stream flowing from the Mountain Lake basin was blocked creating a lake. The lake is unique with its geology, hydrology, possession of a fault and colluvium, as well as high aquatic species diversity. This combination of features is possessed by few if any other lakes in the world.

The first recorded sighting of Mountain Lake by a westerner was by Christopher Gist in 1751. In 1884 W. B. Rogers conducted the first geological study of the lake. He observed that trees and shrubs were seen at considerable depth, attesting to the large fluctuations in lake level. Historically the lake has filled and emptied to as low as 20% of its full size. A second study in 1930 observed that the lake is fed mainly by springs rather than surface input. Later studies surmised that the fluctuations in level were due to a competition between leakage and drought. The low 5:1 watershed-area-to-lake-area would create low inflow compared to outflow in dry spells.

Millions of years ago, the Mountain Lake area was a high valley draining to the southwest. A landslide formed a dam blocking the outlet and creating a lake behind the dam.

== Cultural history ==
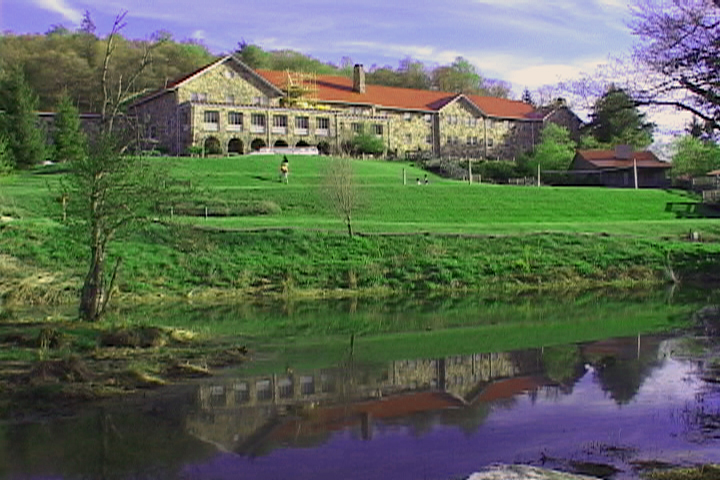
Mountain Lake Hotel, Pembroke VA

Native Americans, early users of the area as a reserve for hunting and fishing, did not intensely occupy the area, but lived in surrounding lands. The first known settler in the area was recorded on a tombstone, "Mary Porter killed by Indians in 1742". Forts were constructed for protection from Indian raids, but massacres by Indians continued to devastate many Giles county families from 1774 to 1778.

The families of early settlers were mostly independent of one another. They lived off the land weaving their clothes and using wooden plowshares for crops. Salt and iron could not be had in the backwoods, so families gathered furs and ginseng to carry by horse to town to exchange for salt and iron. At the close of the Indian Wars in 1794, the country filled rapidly. People built houses, opened farms and roads, elected officers and conducted a civil government without fear of Indian raids.

Settlers continued to engage in small scale agriculture until 1892 when the Potts Valley Branch of the Norfolk and Western arrived. Full service to Waiteville started in 1909. Logging began and most of the trees were removed. Inclined rail technology was used to gain access to steeper slopes. The railroad is now gone and the tracks have been removed, but a remnant of the rail line can be explored by bike or foot on the Potts Mountain Rail Trail.

In order to create watershed protection, the Weeks Act was passed in 1911 for the purchase of lands to create an eastern national forest. In 1937 the Jefferson National Forest was dedicated. The Forest Service has managed the land to minimize the effects of commercial operations, such as logging and mining, that would lead to environmental degradation.

== Other clusters ==
Other clusters of the Wilderness Society's "Mountain Treasures" in the Jefferson National Forest (north to south):

- Glenwood Cluster
- Craig Creek Cluster
- Barbours Creek-Shawvers Run Cluster
- Sinking Creek Valley Cluster
- Angels Rest Cluster
- Walker Mountain Cluster
- Kimberling Creek Cluster
- Garden Mountain Cluster
- Mount Rogers Cluster
- Clinch Ranger District Cluster
