= Hickory Flats =

Protected area in Giles County, Virginia

- IUCN category VI (protected area with sustainable use of natural resources)
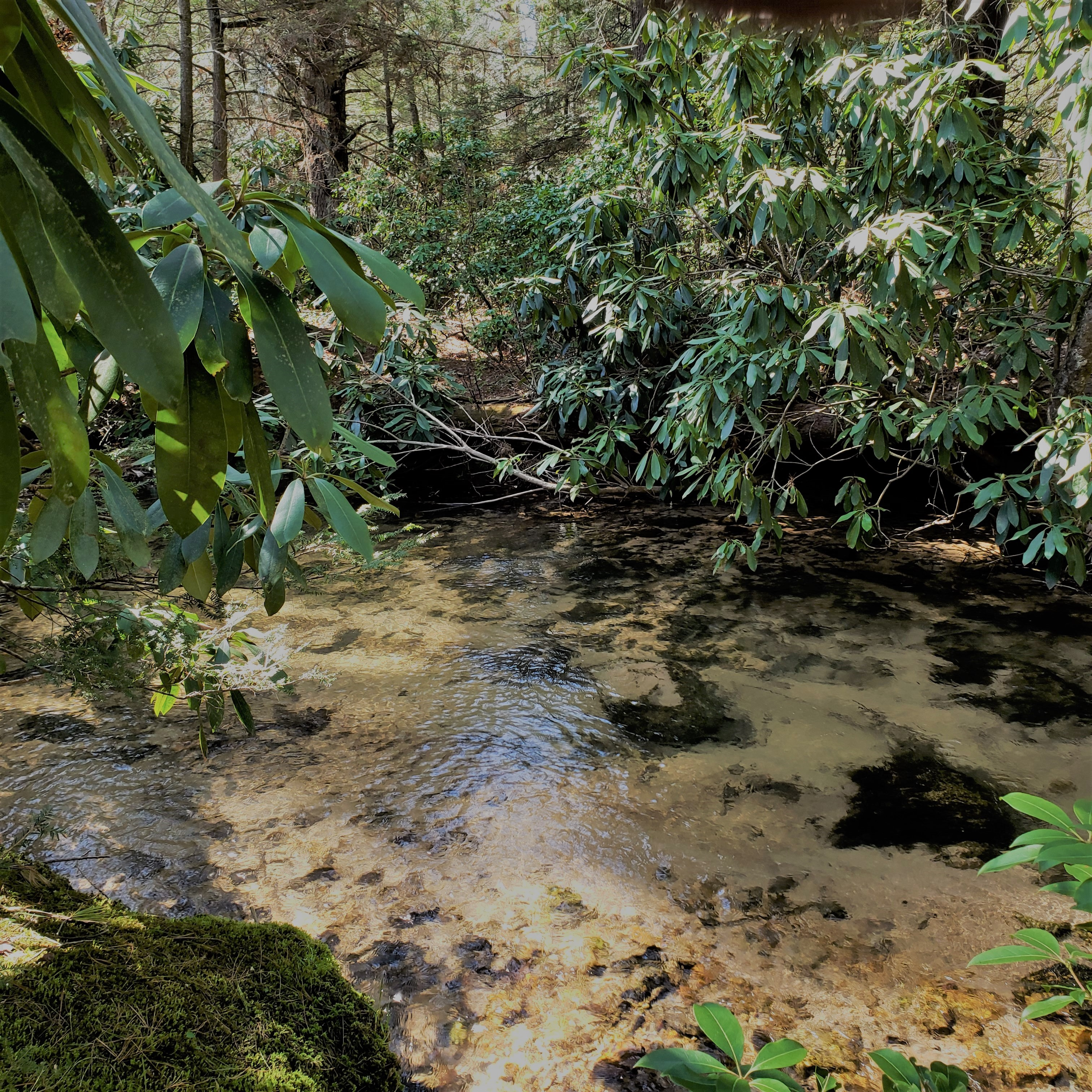

- Location within Virginia
- Location: Giles County, Virginia; Monroe County, West Virginia, United States
- Nearest town: Pembroke, Virginia
- Coordinates: 37°28′10″N 80°30′10″W
- Area: 5,000 acres (20 km^{2})

Hickory Flats is an area in the George Washington and Jefferson National Forests of western Virginia that has been recognized by the Wilderness Society as a special place worthy of protection from logging and road construction. It is in a remote location at the headwaters of two streams with a wetland that contains rare plants and provides an unusual habitat for wildlife.

The area is part of the Mountain Lake Wilderness Cluster.

== Location and access ==
Hickory Flats is located in the Appalachian Mountains of Southwestern Virginia about 20 miles north of Pembroke, Virginia and 6 miles south of Waiteville, West Virginia. Peters Mountain forms the boundary to the northwest, and Big Stony Creek Rd (VA 635) on the southwest. There are gated forest roads and abandoned Jeep trails passing through the area. Good access is gained from State Route 613 (North Fork Mountain Road) that intersects State Route 635 (Big Stony Creek Road). Thick rhododendrons and bogs limit access to the wetlands.

The Allegheny Trail passes along the north side of the area on Peters Mountain.

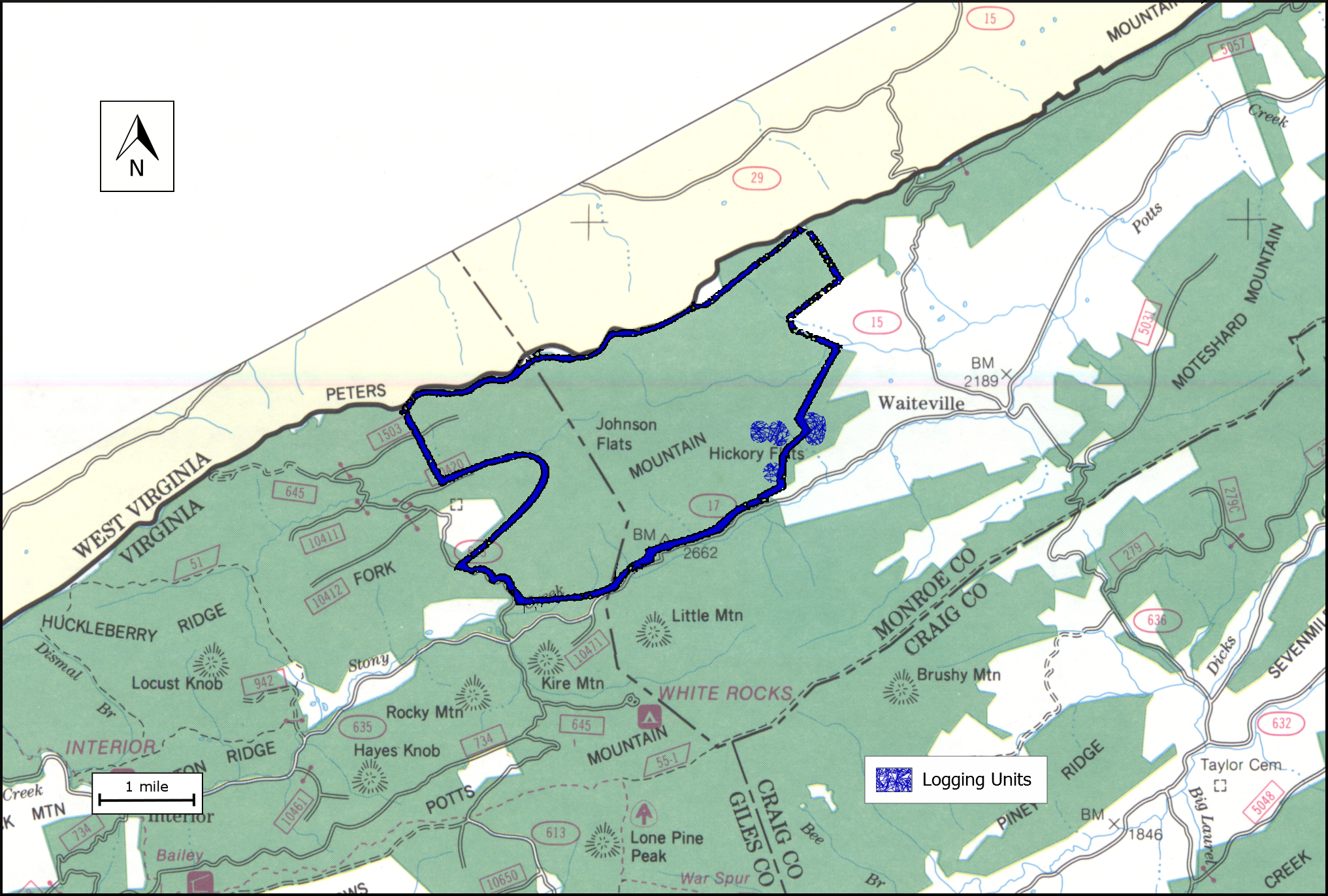
Boundary of Hickory Flats as identified by the Wilderness Society

The boundary of the wildland as determined by the Wilderness Society is shown in the adjacent map. National Geographic Trail Map 788 gives the location of other trails and forest service roads. Additional foot access can be gained using old logging roads. The Appalachian Mountains were extensively timbered in the early twentieth century leaving logging roads that are becoming overgrown but still passable. Old logging roads and railroad grades can be located by consulting the historical topographic maps available from the United States Geological Survey (USGS). The Hickory Flats wild area is covered by USGS topographic maps Waiteville, and Interior.

A great variety of information, including topographic maps, aerial views, satellite data and weather information, is obtained by selecting the link with the wild land's coordinates in the upper right of this page.

== Natural history ==
The habitat of the southern Appalachians is rich in its biological diversity with nearly 10,000 species, some not found anywhere else. The great diversity is related to the many ridges and valleys which form isolated communities in which species evolve separately from one another. The region lies south of the glaciers that covered North America 11,000 years go. To escape the glaciers, northern species retreated south to find refuge in the southern Appalachians. When the glaciers retreated, many of these species remained along with the southern species that were native to the area. The diversity includes trees, mosses, millipedes and salamanders.

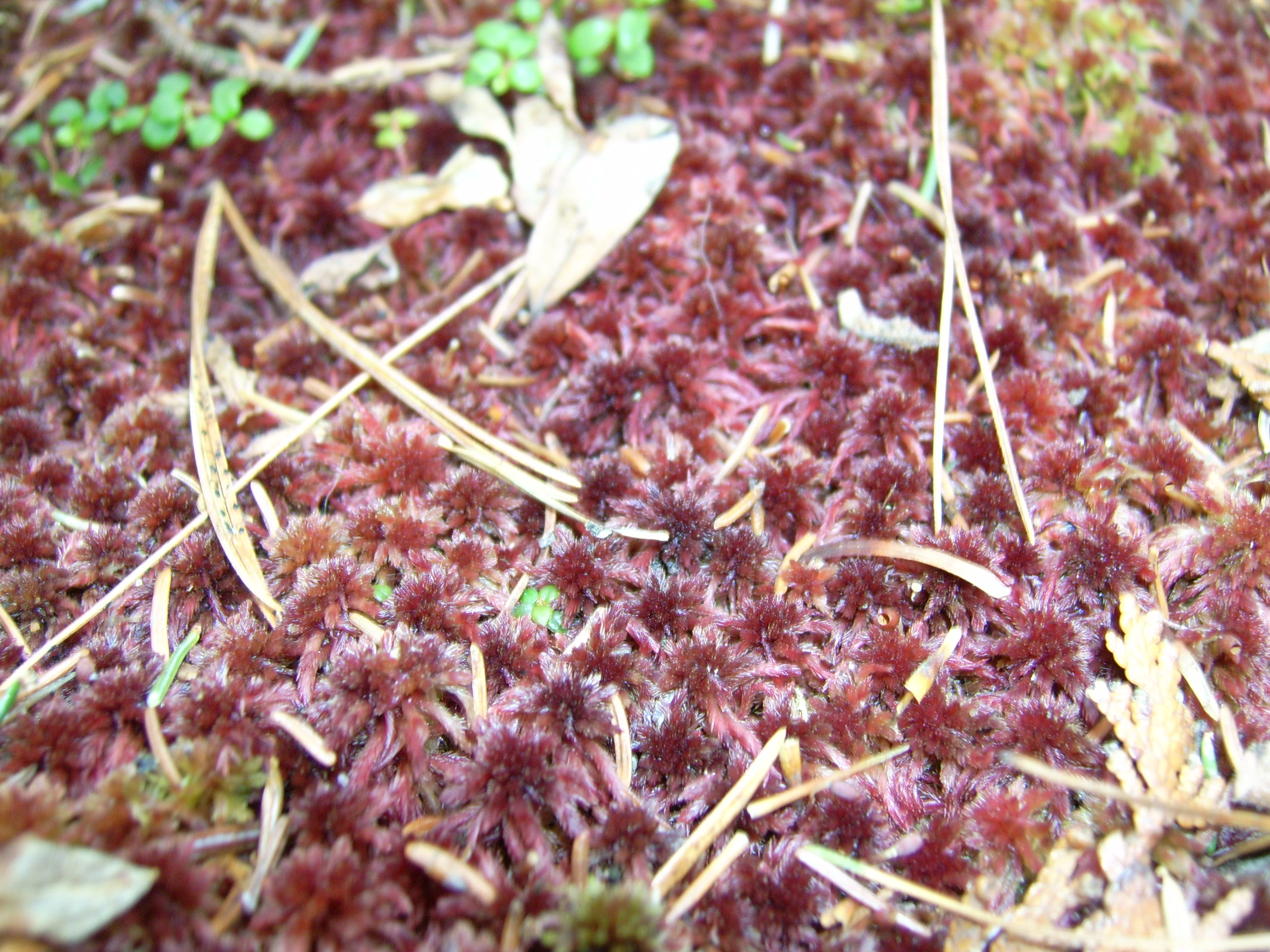
Red peat moss

Unusual plants are the five-rowed peat moss, red peat moss and northern bog club moss. The five-rowed peat moss (Sphagnum quinquefanum) can be recognized by its rather short and stiff branches which appear angular because of the arrangement of its closely set leaves widely angled in 5 ranks. Red peat moss (Sphagnum rubellum) is a small reddish-coloured peat moss with tongue-shaped stem leaves. And northern bog club moss (Lycopodiella inundata) has branches up to 10 cm high with narrow, pointed leaves 4–8 mm long.

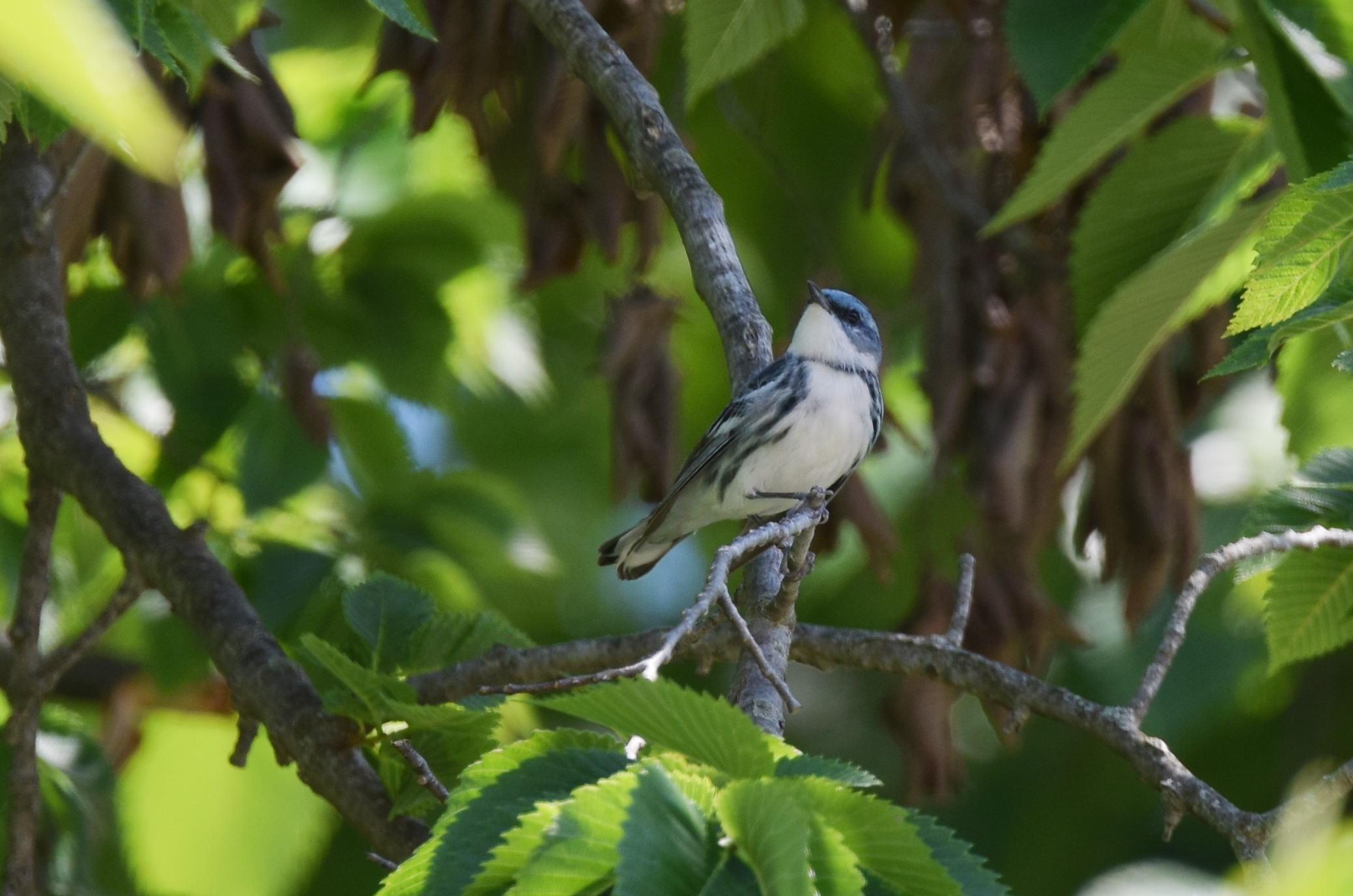
Cerulean Warbler (male)

Hickory Flats provides a secluded habitat for a population of black bear (Ursus americanus). Since bears are shy and secretive, they are rarely seen. When encountered, they will usually run away except in spring when females will protect their cubs, generally by sending them up a tree and returning later to gather them up. The area also provides habitat for ovenbirds, cerulean warblers, hooded warblers, pileated woodpeckers, eastern gray squirrel and eastern wild turkey. Johnson Flats, as well as the Peters Mountain summit, contain old growth forest. These areas serve as optimal habitat for a variety of species, particularly salamanders and other reptiles and amphibians. The valleys contain numerous beaver meadows.

The area includes the upper watershed for both Stony Creek, which flows south into the New River, and Potts Creek, which flows north into the James River. The North Fork of Stony Creek has 259 acres designated as Mountains Wetland Rare Community. It includes 50 acres of the 250-acre North Fork Stony Creek Special Biological Area. Stony Creek is eligible for Recreational River status. The colorful candy darter is found in Stony Creek's rubble riffles with fast-flowing currents.

The Stony Creek watershed on the west end of this area has been a hotspot for gypsy moth damage, with recurring infestations in various parts of the watershed and vicinity for many years. Gypsy moths have cyclical populations. After peaking in nearby Kelly Flats around 2005, populations crashed in 2009, but are expected to return.

== Topography ==
Hickory Flats is in the Ridge and Valley Province of the Appalachian Mountains. The province consists of a thick layer of sedimentary rock that has undergone folding and/or faulting to create a series of ridges and valleys. During the sedimentation process fossils were formed leaving evidence of life existing millions of years ago. The fossils can be seen in rock exposures throughout the mountains.

The topography is typical of the Central Appalachian Province, with long ridges dissected by steep draws and limited flat areas along streams. Elevations range between 2600 feet above sea level along Stony Creek and North Potts Creek to 3900 feet on the top of Fork Mountain and 4,000 feet on Peters Mountain on the north boundary of the area.

== Forest Service management ==
The Forest Service has conducted a survey of their lands to determine their potential for wilderness designation. Wilderness designation provides a high degree of protection from development. The areas that were found suitable are referred to as inventoried roadless areas. Later a Roadless Rule was adopted that limited road construction in these areas. The rule provided some degree of protection by reducing the negative environmental impact of road construction and thus promoting the conservation of roadless areas. Hickory Flats was not included in the inventoried roadless areas, and therefore subject to possible road construction and timber sales.

The Hickory Flats area is managed by the Forest Service to optimize the conditions for black bear habitat. The objectives are to provide a secluded and diverse habitat, ensure adequate den sites, and maintain hard and soft mast production.

In June 2015, the Forest Service proposed a revegetation project to create early successional habitat by commercial timber regeneration harvests. The successional habitat will provide food as well as hiding and nesting cover for a variety of species. The project will also encourage the production of both early and hard mast production to provide food for wildlife. Several objections to the plan were submitted. The Sierra Club was concerned that the area contains substantial old growth forests, recognized conservations sites, and is at the headwaters of stream systems that proved habitat for the endangered candy darter and James River spinymussel. The final objections were published by the Forest Service on September 18, 2015. The project is now (December 18, 2015) under review by the Forest Service.

== Nearby Wildlands ==
Hickory Flats is in the Mountain Lake Wilderness Cluster

Nearby wildlands recognized as one of Virginia's "Mountain Treasures" by the Wilderness Society are:

- Mottesheard
- Cascades (conservation area)
