= Allegheny Township =

Allegheny Township is the name of some places in the U.S. state of Pennsylvania:

- Allegheny Township, Armstrong County, Pennsylvania
- Allegheny Township, Blair County, Pennsylvania
- Allegheny Township, Butler County, Pennsylvania
- Allegheny Township, Cambria County, Pennsylvania
- Allegheny Township, Somerset County, Pennsylvania
- Allegheny Township, Venango County, Pennsylvania
- Allegheny Township, Westmoreland County, Pennsylvania

== See also ==
- Allegany Township, Pennsylvania
- Allegheny, Pennsylvania (disambiguation)
