= Allegheny, Pennsylvania (disambiguation) =

Allegheny, Pennsylvania may refer to:

- Allegheny City, Pennsylvania, which was annexed by the city of Pittsburgh
  - The neighborhood of Allegheny Commons (Pittsburgh)
  - The neighborhood of Allegheny Center in Pittsburgh
- Allegheny County, Pennsylvania
- The neighborhood of Allegheny West (Pittsburgh)
- The neighborhood of East Allegheny (Pittsburgh)
- The neighborhood of Allegheny West, Philadelphia

== See also ==
- Allegheny Township (disambiguation)
- Allegheny (disambiguation)
