= Allegheny station =

Allegheny station may refer to:

- Allegheny station (PAAC), a Pittsburgh Light Rail station
- Allegheny station (SEPTA Regional Rail), a SEPTA Regional Rail station in Philadelphia

== See also ==
- Allegheny (disambiguation)
