= Mountain Lake Wilderness =

Wilderness area in Virginia and West Virginia, United States

- IUCN category Ib (wilderness area)
- Location within Virginia
- Location: United States
- Coordinates: 37°21′53″N 80°33′08″W
- Area: 11,035 acres (44.66 km^{2})
- Established: 1984
- Operator: George Washington and Jefferson National Forests
- Website: Mountain Lake Wilderness

Mountain Lake Wilderness is a U.S. Wilderness Area in the George Washington and Jefferson National Forests. The wilderness area is located next to privately owned Mountain Lake, and consists of 8,314 acres (3,365 ha) in Virginia and 2,721 acres (1,101 ha) in West Virginia.

Thanks to frequent rains and a high elevation, the wilderness provides habitat not found in other areas of the southern Appalachians, habitats such as mountain bogs, vernal ponds and red spruce wetlands.

The area is part of the Mountain Lake Wilderness Cluster.

== Location and access ==
The wilderness is about 10 miles northwest of Pembroke, Virginia in Craig and Giles Counties in southwest Virginia, and Monroe County, West Virginia. State route 615 passes along the western side of the wilderness, state route 635 passes along a section to the northwest, and SR 632 runs parallel to the wilderness on the southeast, offset by about 0.5 mile.

There are eight trails in the area:

- Appalachian Trail, 5 miles, trailheads on Va 632 and 635
- Potts mountain, 2.8 miles, tralhead on Va 635
- Sartain Trail, 5.0 miles, Va 632
- War Spur Loop, 1.8 miles, trailhead on Va 635
- War Spr Connector, 1.2 miles, trailhead on Va 635
- Virginia’s Walk, 1.3 miles, trailhead on Va 645

The War Spur overlook, with "outstanding views of the surrounding mountains" that are covered with eastern hardwood forests, is reached by the War Spur and Chestnut Trail loop. The trailhead for this 2.5-mile (4.0 km) hike is on Route 700, 3 miles (5 km) north of Mountain Lake.

== Natural history ==
The area has a rich variety of wildlife; 43 species of mammals and over 70 species of birds include substantial populations of wild turkey, muskrat, beaver and gray fox. In addition small populations of least shrew, meadow jumping mouse, long-tailed weasel, striped skunk and the harvest mouse have been found. Endangered species of salamander may exist here.

Bird populations include red crossbill, winter wren, veery, black-capped chickadee, Blackburnian warbler, rosebreasted grosbeak, and cerulean warblers; birds found in high_elevations and deep-woods.

Waters flowing south into Johns Creek provide habitat for the James spiny mussel, an endangered mollusk, and streams flowing north into Big Stony Creek support the candy darter, a colorful fish considered endangered by the International Union for Conservation of Nature.

Bogs contain flexuouse peatmoss, red peatmoss, tawny cotton-grass, and wood grass, plants normally found in areas to the north. Cinnamon ferns, New York ferns and many other wetland plants are found in vernal pools. Southern mountain cranberry, flame azalea, pinxter, mayflower, yellow Clintonia are found along trails. The forests have been altered by logging in the 1920s and the loss of the American Chestnut by the chestnut blight. Besides red spruce and yellow birch, the forest includes eastern hemlock, a tree fast disappearing after infestation by the hemlock wooly adelgid, as well as oak and hickory common in the Virginia section of the Appalachians .,

Spring wildflowers include bellwort, bloodroot, columbine, dwarf iris, fire pink, hepatica, jack-in-the-pulpit, lady slipper, ragwort, Solomon’s seal spring beauty, trailing arbutus trillium, trout lily, several varieties of violets, wild germanium, wild ginger and wintergreen. In summer and fall the flower display turns to black-eyed susans, boneset, goldenrods, grass of parnassus, great blue lobelia, Indian pipe, joe pye weed, milkweed, pokeweed, stiff gentian, and jewel weed. In addition there are flowering shrubs such as flame azalea, blue berry, dogwood, redbud, service berry and rhododendron.

== Topography ==
Mountain Lake Wilderness ranges in elevation from about 2,200 feet (670 m) to over 4,000 feet (1,200 m). The area is bisected by the Eastern Continental Divide and has about 17 miles (27 km) of hiking trails, including 5 miles (8 km) of the Appalachian Trail.

The area is part of the Ridge and Valley System of mountains. The intersection of Potts Mountain and Salt Pond Mountain create a plateau like area. Piney ridge runs along the northeast side of the wilderness and Little Mountain on the northwest. The area is on the Continental Divide; streams on the west side drain into Johns Creek, part of the James River watershed that flows into the Atlantic; and streams on the south east flow into the New River and onto the Gulf of Mexico.

Johns Creek once drained into the New River watershed, but millions of years ago the James River watershed expanded, capturing Johns Creek.

Rockcrops at White Rocks, War Spur Overlook, Bear Cliffs, and Windrock give "outstanding views" over the area.

== See also ==
- George Washington and Jefferson National Forests
- Mountain Lake
- Mountain Lake Wilderness Cluster
- Virginia Wilderness Committee site
