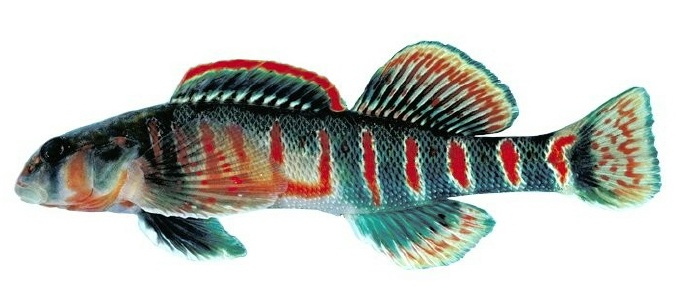

Conservation status
- Near Threatened (IUCN 3.1)

- Endangered (ESA)

Scientific classification
- Kingdom: Animalia
- Phylum: Chordata
- Class: Actinopterygii
- Order: Perciformes
- Family: Percidae
- Genus: Etheostoma
- Species: E. osburni

Binomial name
- Etheostoma osburni (C. L. Hubbs & Trautman, 1932)

Synonyms
- Poecilichthys osburni C.L. Hubbs & Trautman, 1932

= Etheostoma osburni =

Species of fish

Etheostoma osburni, the candy darter or finescale saddled darter, is a species of fish in the family Percidae, a member of the group known as darters. This species is endemic to the eastern United States where it is known only from the Kanawha River system in the states of Virginia and West Virginia.

== Description and natural history ==
E. osburni can reach a length of 10 cm (3.9 in), though most only reach about 7.3 cm (2.9 in). This species has a lifespan of up to three years. It spawns in April and May. It is an invertivore, feeding on aquatic insect larvae and water mites.

== Habitat and geographic distribution ==
E. osburni lives in a system of rivers, streams, and creeks in the central Appalachian Mountains. It can be found in rapid riffles in rocky riverbed habitat. It occurs in cold, cool, and warm waters, as long as the substrate is rocky and the water is clear. It tolerates fast currents.

== Conservation ==
E. osburni has a limited geographic range, it has been recorded in more than 10 locations and does not have a severely fragmented distribution, so it has been designated a near-threatened species on the IUCN Red List. In 2018, US Fish and Wildlife Service designated it as a federally protected endangered species. It is probably declining, however, due to threats from human activity. It prefers clear, unsilted waters, and increases in silt and sediment may reduce populations by reducing tolerable habitat.

== Taxonomy and etymology ==
E. osburni was first formally described as Poecilichthys osburni in 1932 by the American ichthyologists Carl Leavitt Hubbs and Milton Bernhard Trautman with the type locality given as Stony Creek which is a tributary of the Greenbrier River in Pocahontas County, West Virginia. The specific name honors the American zoologist Raymond Carroll Osburn (1872–1955). The candy darter is considered to be closely related to the variegate darter (E. variatum).

== In popular culture ==
In 2023 E. osburni was featured on a United States Postal Service forever stamp as part of the Endangered Species set, based on a photograph from Joel Sartore's Photo Ark. The stamp was dedicated at a ceremony at the National Grasslands Visitor Center in Wall, South Dakota.

== See also ==
- Etheostoma osburni
- A Sweeter Future for Candy Darter
- Coal operation and candy darter habitat
- Candy Darter
- Candy Darter video
- West Virginia Highlands Conservancy
