= Allegheny Valley Railroad =

Allegheny Valley Railroad is the name of two different railroads in Pennsylvania:

- Allegheny Valley Railroad (1852–1892), later part of the Pennsylvania Railroad
- Allegheny Valley Railroad (1995), current shortline

== See also ==
- Allegheny Valley Railway
