= Etheostoma variatum =

- Etheostoma variatum

Conservation status
- Least Concern (IUCN 3.1)

Scientific classification
- Kingdom: Animalia
- Phylum: Chordata
- Class: Actinopterygii
- Order: Perciformes
- Family: Percidae
- Genus: Etheostoma
- Species: E. variatum

Binomial name
- Etheostoma variatum J. P. Kirtland, 1840

Species of fish

Etheostoma variatum, the variegate darter, is a species of freshwater ray-finned fish, a darter from the subfamily Etheostomatinae, part of the family Percidae, which also contains the perches, ruffes and pikeperches. It is native to the eastern United States where it occurs primarily in the Ohio River basin; it is present in the states of Ohio, New York, Pennsylvania, Indiana, West Virginia and Kentucky with a small population in Virginia. It is a large darter, growing to 10 cm (4 in) long, orange-red with black vertical barring on its body, and horizontal barring on its front dorsal fin. Its typical habitat is swift-flowing riffles with rubble, boulder and gravel. No major threats have been identified for this fish and the International Union for Conservation of Nature has assessed its conservation status as being of "least concern".

== Description ==
Etheostoma variatum is large in size for its family; it has an average length of between two and a half and three and a half inches (6 and 9 cm). It has a wide variety of markings. There is a red-orange band on its dorsal fin, which is followed by a blue-green band and a red-brown band at the edge of the fin. There are also red spots located on its other fins.

This darter has large pectoral fins, which are used to keep the fish upright in the fast-moving streams it inhabits. It also has four to six saddles along its back. Three to four of these saddles tend to be dark and visible while the remaining saddles are not.

== Habitat ==
Etheostoma variatum lives in small and medium rivers and streams. They tend to live within riffles that contain small rocks. The darter will tend to live in the fastest flowing riffles. In order to survive, it needs rivers and streams with high water quality. Due to this attribute, the fish is often viewed as an indicator of good water quality.

The darter lives predominantly in the states of Ohio, New York, Pennsylvania, Indiana, West Virginia and Kentucky. It has also been found within Virginia, although only rarely.

== Behavior ==
=== Diet ===
The diet of E. variatum consists of crustaceans, insect larvae and other aquatic invertebrates.

=== Reproduction ===
During the early spring, males establish spawning territory, which will occur from April to May. After spawning, the eggs are laid in riffles by females, who will bury them with pebbles. After the eggs are buried, they are abandoned by the parents.

== Status ==
The population trend of this fish seems to be stable and it is a common species with numerous sub-populations over a wide range, and the International Union for Conservation of Nature has assessed its conservation status as being of "least concern".
