= Salt Pond Mountain =

Mountain in the U.S. state of Virginia

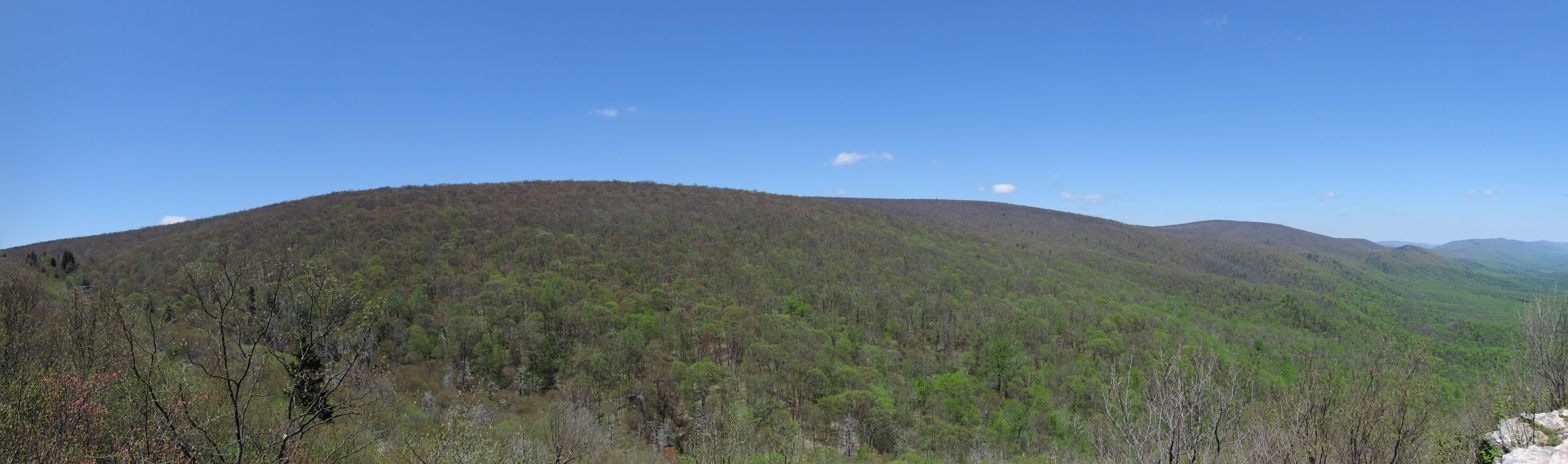

Highest point
- Elevation: 4,361 ft (1,329 m)
- Prominence: 2,041 ft (622 m)
- Coordinates: 37°24′30″N 80°29′40″W

Geography
- Location: Giles County, Virginia, U.S.
- Parent range: Ridge-and-valley Appalachians
- Topo map(s): USGS Eggleston, Interior, Waiteville

Salt Pond Mountain is a mountain located in Giles County, Virginia. The mountain, which is part of the Ridge-and-valley province of the Appalachian Mountains, extends about seven miles (11 km) from southwest to northeast. The highest peak is Bald Knob, at the southeast end, south of Mountain Lake. Salt Pond Mtn. joins Johns Creek Mountain at the southwest end, and the Big Mountain – Potts Mountain ridge at the northeast end, just south of West Virginia.

Salt Pond Mountain is on the Eastern Continental Divide between the regions which drain south into the Gulf of Mexico and east directly into the Atlantic Ocean. The south end of Salt Pond Mtn. drains into Sinking Creek and Doe Creek, thence into New River, the Kanawha River, the Ohio River, the Mississippi River, and into the Gulf of Mexico. The northwest side of Salt Pond Mtn. drains into Little Stony Creek, and thence into the New River. The southeast side of Salt Pond Mtn. drains into Johns Creek, thence into Craig Creek, and the James River, which drains into the Chesapeake Bay.

The Appalachian Trail, a 2,170-mile (3,490 km) National Scenic Trail from Georgia to Maine, crosses the northeast end of Salt Pond Mtn.

A large part of the mountain is within the Mountain Lake Wilderness Cluster.
