= Mottesheard =

Protected area in Virginia, United States

- IUCN category VI (protected area with sustainable use of natural resources)
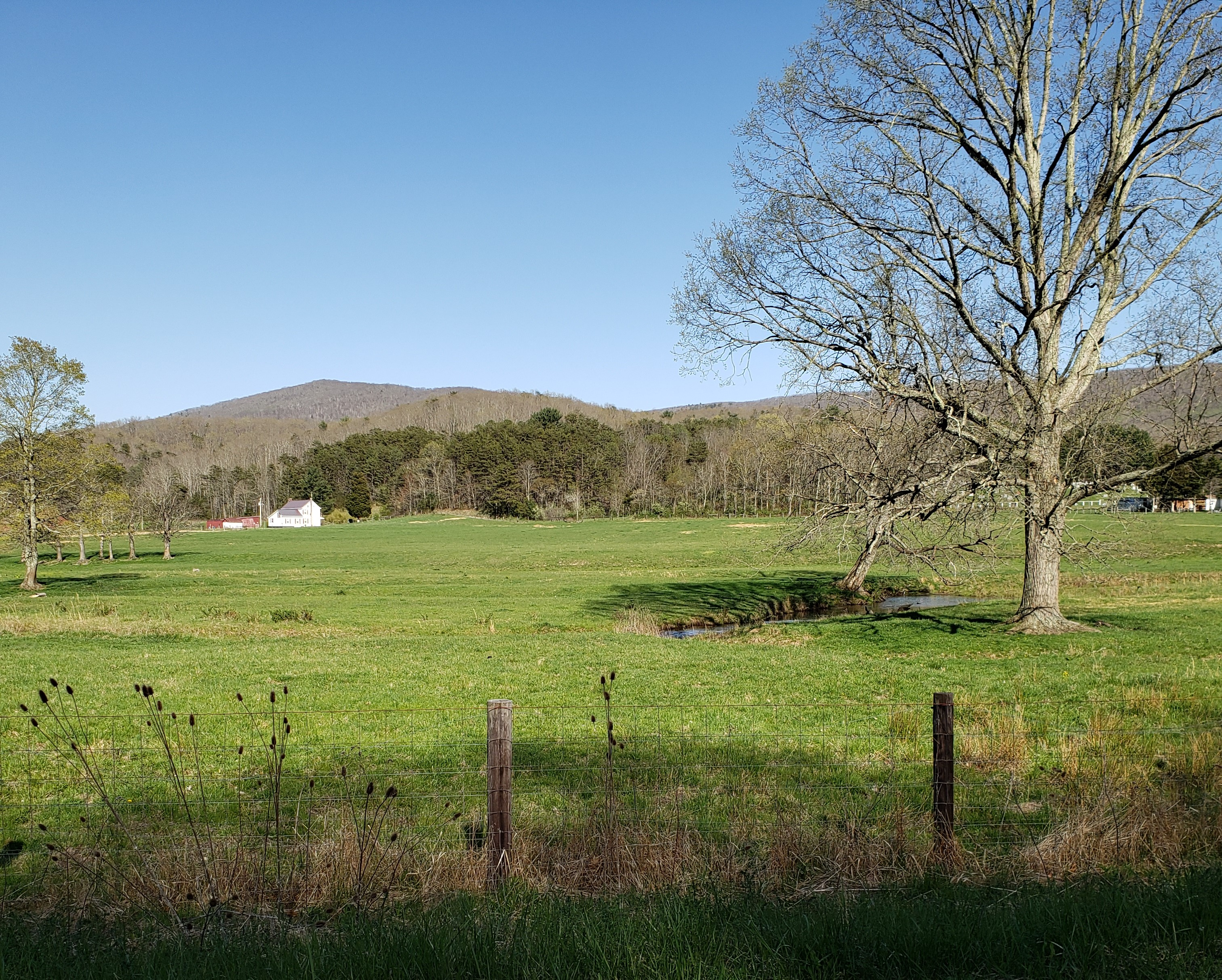

- Location within Virginia
- Location: Craig County, Virginia; Monroe County, West Virginia, United States
- Nearest town: Waiteville, West Virginia
- Coordinates: 37°29′3″N 80°21′54″W
- Area: 6,555 acres (26.53 km^{2})

Mottesheard is an area in the George Washington and Jefferson National Forests of western Virginia that has been recognized by the Wilderness Society as a special place worthy of protection from logging and road construction. It is in a remote location with rocky outcrops, old growth forests and views of the surrounding hills.

The area is part of the Mountain Lake Wilderness Cluster.

== Location and access ==
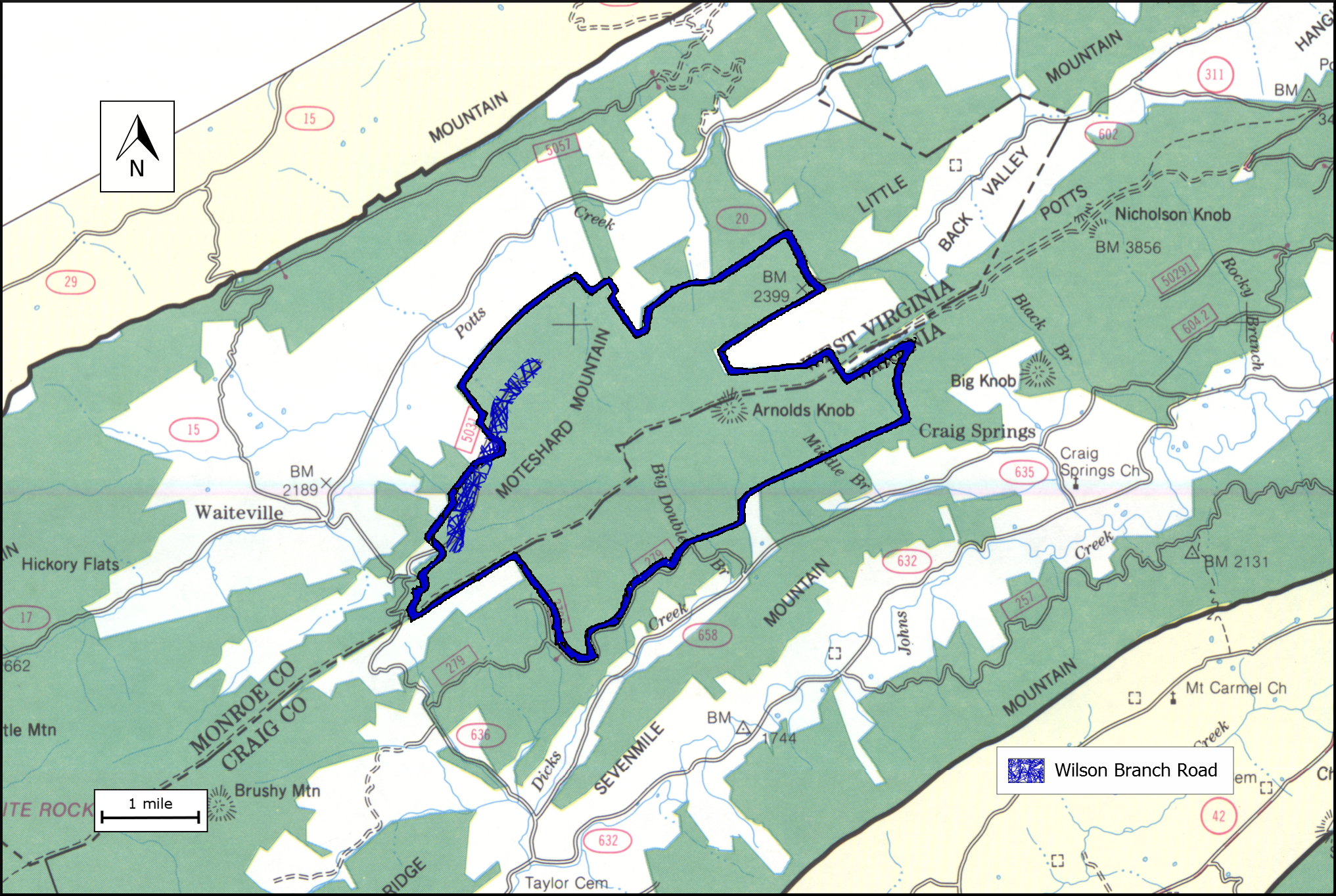
Boundary of the Mottesheard wild area as identified by the Wilderness Society

Mottesheard is located in the Appalachian Mountains of Southwestern Virginia about 5 miles west of Waiteville, West Virginia. Waiteville Rd (WVa 17) is on the northwest of the area, Limestone Rd.(WVa 15) and Old Waiteville Rd (Va 636) is to the southwest, Mudlick Rd. to the southeast, and Crowder Rd. (WVa 20) to the northeast. There are gated forest roads and abandoned jeep trails passing through the area. Access is possible from Wilson Creek Road that intersects Limestone Road southeast of Waiteville.

There are no official trails within the area, but there are roads that can be gated when the Forest Service wants to limit access. The roads are shown on National Geographic Trail Map 788.

== Natural history ==
The habitat of the southern Appalachians is rich in its biological diversity with nearly 10,000 species, some not found anywhere else. This diversity is related to the many ridges and valleys which form isolated communities in which species evolve separately from one another. The region lies south of the glaciers that covered North America 11,000 years go. To escape the glaciers, northern species retreated south to find refuge in the southern Appalachians. When the glaciers retreated, many of these species remained along with the southern species that were native to the area. The diversity includes trees, mosses, millipedes and salamanders.

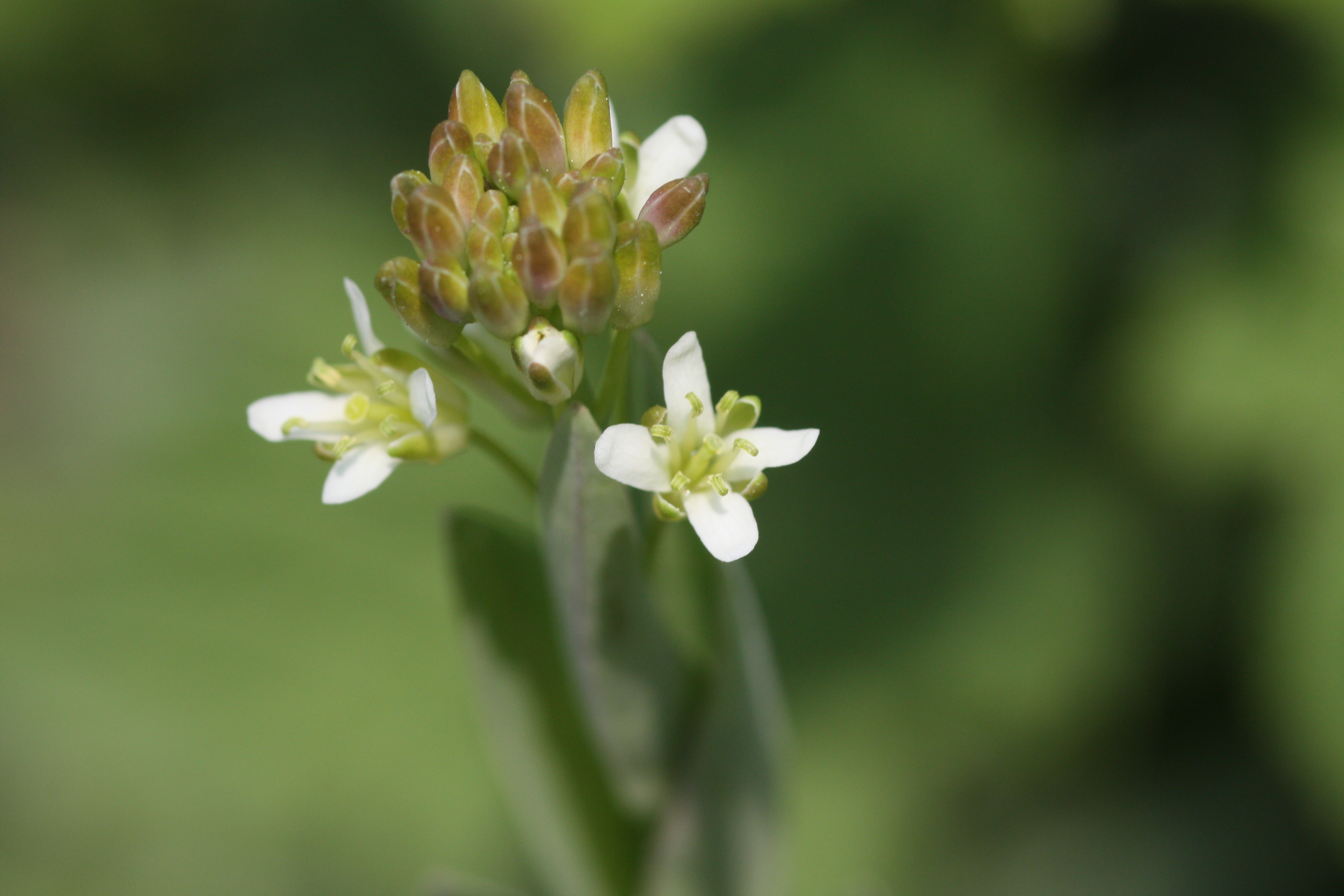
Tower_mustard plant, "Arabis glabra"

Mottesheard contains the tower-mustard plant, listed by the state as rare, and streams in the area flow into creeks inhabited by the James River Spinymussel, a federally endangered species. The tower-mustard plant (Arabis glabra) has creamy white flowers that bloom from May to June. The James River spinymussel is a small fresh water mussel slightly less than three inches long with occasional short spines on each valve.

== Topography ==
Mottesheard is in the Ridge and Valley Province of the Appalachian Mountains. The province consists of a thick layer of sedimentary rock that has undergone folding and/or faulting to create a series of ridges and valleys. During the sedimentation process fossils were formed leaving evidence of life existing millions of years ago. The fossils can be seen in rock exposures throughout the mountains.

The topography is typical of the Central Appalachian Province, with long ridges dissected by steep draws and limited flat areas along streams. Elevations range from valleys at 2200 ft to Arnold Knob at 3932 ft and Mottesheard Mountain at 3740 ft. It is lies on both sides of Potts Mountain, a ridge that extends along the West Virginia-Virginia border.

== Forest Service management ==
The Forest Service has conducted a survey of their lands to determine the potential for wilderness designation. Wilderness designation provides a high degree of protection from development. The areas that were found suitable are referred to as inventoried roadless areas. Later a Roadless Rule was adopted that limited road construction in these areas. The rule provided some degree of protection by reducing the negative environmental impact of road construction and thus promoting the conservation of roadless areas. Mottesheard was included in the inventoried roadless areas, and therefore protected from possible road construction and timber sales.

The area includes several types of Forest Service management prescriptions—"Black Bear Habitat", "Remote Backcountry—Non-Motorized" and "Old Growth With Disturbance". "Black Bear Habitat" is managed to maintain a natural, forested appearance with a minimum of roads to provide a secluded habitat. Motorized use is restricted during the spring to late summer to reduce disturbance of females with cubs. "Remote Backcountry—Non-Motorized" is managed for recreational opportunities in large remote areas where users can obtain a degree of solitude. And "Old Growth With Disturbance" is managed with an emphasis on protection and restoration of the old growth forest with associated wildlife, botanical, recreational, scientific, educational, cultural and spiritual values.

== Nearby Wildlands ==
Mottesheard is in the Mountain Lake Wilderness Cluster.

Nearby wildlands recognized as one of Virginia's "Mountain Treasures" by the Wilderness Society are:

- Hickory Flats
- Cascades (conservation area)
