= Allegheny, Kentucky =

Unincorporated community in Kentucky, United States

Allegheny
- Unincorporated community
- Location within the state of Kentucky Allegheny (the United States)
- Coordinates: 37°16′14″N 82°29′7″W
- Country: United States
- State: Kentucky
- County: Pike
- Elevation: 1,414 ft (431 m)
- Time zone: UTC-5 (Eastern (EST))
  - Summer (DST): UTC-4 (EDT)
- ZIP codes: 41547
- GNIS feature ID: 2337483

Allegheny was an unincorporated community and coal town in Pike County, Kentucky, United States. The coal works are no longer active and the site of the former community is now a ghost town.
