= Peters Mountain =

Mountain in Virginia and West Virginia, United States

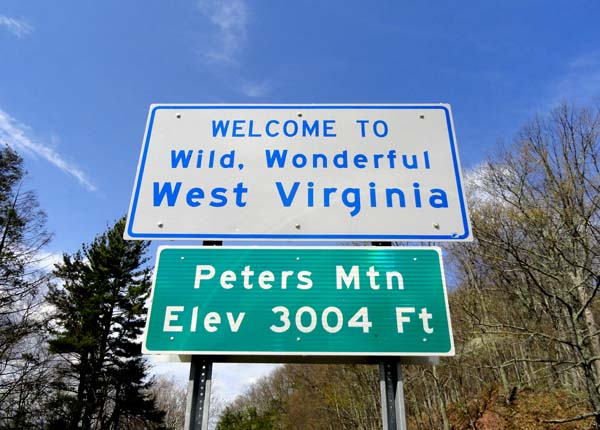
- At the state line along Route 311

Highest point
- Peak: Monroe County High Point, Monroe County, WV/Giles County, VA
- Elevation: 4,073 ft (1,241 m)
- Coordinates: 37°28′36″N 80°31′30″W

Dimensions
- Length: 52 mi (84 km)

Geography
- Location within West Virginia
- Country: United States
- States: Virginia and West Virginia
- Counties: Alleghany VA, Craig VA, Giles VA and Monroe WV
- Range coordinates: 37°36′24″N 80°14′27″W
- Parent range: Allegheny Mountains
- Topo map: USGS

Peters Mountain is a 52-mile (84 km) mountain in the U.S. states of Virginia and West Virginia. It is located on the border between Alleghany County, VA, Monroe County, WV, Giles Co., VA, and Craig Co., VA. Its elevation ranges from 4,073 feet (1,241 m) on the mountaintop to a low of 2,300 feet (700 m). It produces some of the water supply for Monroe County.

There are numerous sandstone outcroppings along the crest of the Peters Mountain and a number of high mountain bogs on Pine Swamp Ridge. The Mountain is primarily forested with upland oak, yellow poplar, red oak, and hickory. Iliamna corei, the Peters Mountain Mallow, is unique to this area and one of the rarest plants in North America, with only a few individual plants.

The mountain was named for Peter Wright, who settled by the mountain in Covington, Virginia in 1746.

The Appalachian Trail traverses part of the crest of Peters Mountain. The Allegheny Trail also reaches its southern terminus here at the state boundary.

The Peters Mountain Wilderness, lying on the east slope of Peters Mountain in Virginia and designated in 1984, now has a total of 4,531 acres (18.34 km^{2}). It is managed by Jefferson National Forest.
