= Allegheny Township, Venango County, Pennsylvania =

Township in Pennsylvania, US

- Township
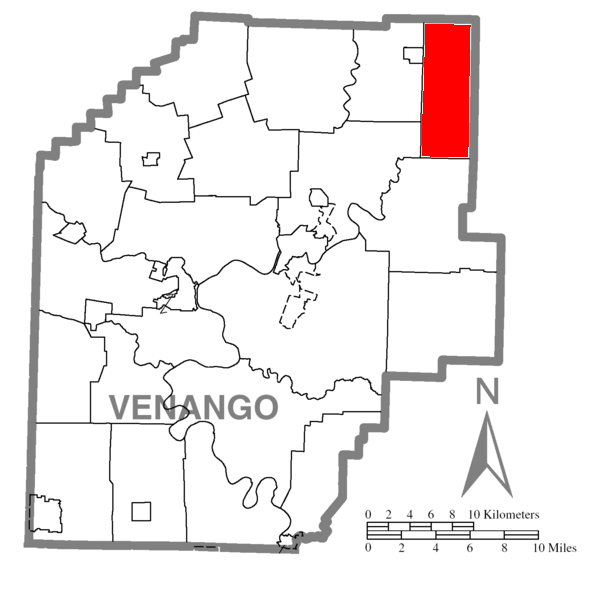
- Map of Venango County, Pennsylvania highlighting Allegheny Township

- Map of Venango County, Pennsylvania
- Country: United States
- State: Pennsylvania
- County: Venango
- Settled: 1796
- Incorporated: 1800

Government
  - Type: Board of Supervisors

Area
  - Total: 24.97 sq mi (64.68 km^{2})
  - Land: 24.97 sq mi (64.68 km^{2})
  - Water: 0 sq mi (0.00 km^{2})

Population (2020)
  - Total: 283 ▲
  - Estimate (2024): 278
  - Density: 10.5/sq mi (4.07/km^{2})
- Time zone: UTC-5 (Eastern (EST))
  - Summer (DST): UTC-4 (EDT)
- Area code: 814
- FIPS code: 42-121-00884

Allegheny Township is a township in Venango County, Pennsylvania, United States. The population was 283 at the 2020 census, an increase from 276 in 2010, which was, in turn, a decline from the tabulation of 281 as of the 2000 census.

== Geography ==
According to the United States Census Bureau, the township has a total area of 25.0 square miles (65 km^{2}), all land.

== Demographics ==
Historical population
Census	Pop.	Note	%±
2000	281		—
2010	276		−1.8%
2020	283		2.5%
2024 (est.)	278		−1.8%
U.S. Decennial Census

As of the census of 2000, there were 281 people, 108 households, and 85 families residing in the township. The population density was 11.3 people per square mile (4.3/km^{2}). There were 184 housing units at an average density of 7.4/sq mi (2.8/km^{2}). The racial makeup of the township was 96.44% White, 1.07% Native American, and 2.49% from two or more races.

There were 108 households, out of which 29.6% had children under the age of 18 living with them, 73.1% were married couples living together, 4.6% had a female householder with no husband present, and 20.4% were non-families. 15.7% of all households were made up of individuals, and 9.3% had someone living alone who was 65 years of age or older. The average household size was 2.60 and the average family size was 2.93.

In the township the population was spread out, with 22.4% under the age of 18, 5.3% from 18 to 24, 29.9% from 25 to 44, 25.3% from 45 to 64, and 17.1% who were 65 years of age or older. The median age was 42 years. For every 100 females, there were 93.8 males. For every 100 females age 18 and over, there were 103.7 males.

The median income for a household in the township was $37,500, and the median income for a family was $43,125. Males had a median income of $28,571 versus $24,063 for females. The per capita income for the township was $15,646. About 2.2% of families and 7.9% of the population were below the poverty line, including 13.8% of those under the age of 18 and 8.3% of those 65 or over.
