= Allegheny Trail =

Hiking trail in West Virginia

- Length: 330 mi (530 km)
- Location: Eastern West Virginia, USA
- Trailheads: South: Appalachian Trail; North: Mason–Dixon line
- Use: Hiking
- Hazards: Severe Weather

The Allegheny Trail is a 330-mile (530 km) hiking trail that passes through the Allegheny Mountains in West Virginia, and part of western Virginia, United States. It is the longest named trail in the state excepting the Appalachian Trail, 4 miles (6.4 km) of which traverses the state at Harpers Ferry.

== History ==
The trail was formed in 1975 by Nicolas B. Lozano and Robert (Bob) Tabor Jr. After a chance encounter at meeting of the Izaak Walton league and a long discussion in the parking lot about a shared dream of a trail connecting to the Appalachian Trail and the West Virginia – Virginia border, the idea for the Allegheny trail first took form in 1971. After scouting out potential locations for the trail in Pocahontas County, West Virginia in July 1971, the two and three others founded the West Virginia Scenic Trails Association, then known as the West Virginia Scenic Trails Conference in October 1971. After some organizational meetings, flagging began on the trail from Peters Mountain to the Salt Sulphur Springs Turnpike in August 1973. In April 1974, the West Virginia Scenic Trails Conference was renamed the West Virginia Scenic Trails Association, and remains so to this day. Also in 1974, this time in July, the original routing and blaze color for the Allegheny Trail were selected. Although International Orange was the first selection, the color was off limits due to having recently been given a national designation for trial use by off-road vehicles, so the color yellow was chosen instead. The first official agreement was signed in regard to the trail in August 1975, between the West Virginia Scenic Trails Association and the West Virginia Division of Natural Resources, with more agreements following after.

== Route ==
The trail is broken down into four sections, each with a coordinator and all but section four with an assistant coordinator administering the trail. The trail as a whole is managed and administered by West Virginia Scenic Trails Association, a volunteer association.

=== Section One ===
The first section of the Allegheny Trail begins at the northern terminus of the Allegheny Trail, which is a signed trailhead near Bruceton Mills at the Mason–Dixon line, which here represents the boundary between West Virginia and Pennsylvania. Originally routed for 89.0 miles from the Mason-Dixon line to the stables parking lot in Blackwater Falls State Park, the section now runs approximately due south for 95.1 miles and ends at the stables parking lot in Blackwater Falls State Park. This section had to be rerouted around the Army National Guard firing range at Camp Dawson.

=== Section Two ===
Section two of the trail begins at the terminus of section one in the stables parking lot in Blackwater Falls State Park and runs approximately southwest for 91.8 miles to the parking lot for the Cass Scenic Railroad. The original route in the 1983 first edition hiking guide ran for 88.9 miles from the same starting point to the east side of the Greenbrier River in Cass, West Virginia. One of the major hiking challenges in this section is the lower Glady Fork, where two washouts in 1985 and the early 2000s, as well as numerous flash floods along the 5.4 mile lower Glady Fork section of the Allegheny Trail can make navigating this section rather difficult and has necessitated the finding of an alternate high water route around the washouts. This route is not always necessary but is always available for high water conditions, which are usually in late fall to early summer.

=== Section Three ===
The original routing for section three in 1983 ran from the original terminus of section two on the east side of the Greenbrier River in Cass to The Dock on Meadow Creek near Lake Sherwood. This route was 48.7 Miles and also ran mostly southwest, with a due east section at the end. The current routing runs 64.26 miles from the Cass Scenic Railroad Parking lot to an intersection in Greenbrier County where the trail meets county road 14. This section of trail was partially temporarily rerouted to Beaver Lick mountain road in January, 2022 to navigate around a logging project near the dock that may take up to three years.

=== Section Four ===
The original routing does not provide a distance in miles, as section four was still in development when the first edition hiking guide was written in 1983. As noted in the first edition hiking guide, “Officially the southern end of the Alleghany Trail will be at the junction with the Appalachian Trail. But effectively, the Alleghany Trail will have its southernmost point at Sugarcamp farm (near Lindside).” The assumed starting point for this section is the terminus of section three. As of the 2019 4th edition of the guide, section four of the trail ends at the Appalachian Trail on Peters Mountain on the Virginia – West Virginia border.The trail does not route all the way there however, as section four is in two subsections divided by a 33.3 mile road walk. Including the road walk, this section is 69.95 miles. The two subsections themselves, excluding the road walk, total 36.65 miles.

==== Section Four North ====
The north subsection of section four is a 15.63 mile hike from the terminus of section three to interstate 64.

==== Section Four South ====
The southern subsection of section four is a 21.02 mile hike from the south trailhead at hanging rock to the southern terminus of the Alleghany Trail at the junction with the Appalachian trail on Peters Mountain, at the West Virginia – Virginia border.
