= National Register of Historic Places listings in Giles County, Virginia =

Location of Giles County in Virginia

This is a list of the National Register of Historic Places listings in Giles County, Virginia.

This is intended to be a complete list of the properties and districts on the National Register of Historic Places in Giles County, Virginia, United States. The locations of National Register properties and districts for which the latitude and longitude coordinates are included below, may be seen in an online map.

There are 11 properties and districts listed on the National Register in the county.

This National Park Service list is complete through NPS recent listings posted March 6, 2026.

== Current listings ==
| | Name on the Register | Image | Date listed | Location | City or town | Description |
|---|---|---|---|---|---|---|
| 1 | Doe Creek Farm | Doe Creek Farm | June 12, 2017 (#100001079) | 412 Doe Creek Rd. 37°19′40″N 80°34′36″W | Pearisburg | |
| 2 | Giles County Courthouse | Giles County Courthouse | September 9, 1982 (#82004560) | U.S. Route 460 and State Route 100; 37°19′37″N 80°44′06″W | Pearisburg | |
| 3 | Greater Newport Rural Historic District | Greater Newport Rural Historic District | December 14, 2000 (#00000489) | Roughly bounded by U.S. Route 460, State Route 42, and Clover Hollow, Lucas, Zells Mills, Spruce Run, and Mountain Lake Rds. 37°17′39″N 80°29′44″W | Newport | |
| 4 | Andrew Johnston House | Andrew Johnston House | February 11, 1993 (#93000041) | 208 N. Main St. 37°19′42″N 80°44′09″W | Pearisburg | |
| 5 | Narrows Commercial Historic District | Narrows Commercial Historic District | June 4, 2014 (#14000301) | 100-300 blocks of Main St. and 100 blocks of Mary St., Monroe St., Center St., and MacArthur Ln. 37°19′53″N 80°48′41″W | Narrows | |
| 6 | Newport Historic District | Newport Historic District | February 25, 1994 (#94000059) | Area surrounding Greenbriar Branch Rd. and State Route 42; 37°17′36″N 80°29′46″W | Newport | |
| 7 | Pearisburg Historic District | Pearisburg Historic District | January 30, 1992 (#92000004) | Roughly, Wenonah Ave. from Tazewell St. to Main St. and adjacent parts of N. and S. Main; 37°19′35″N 80°44′06″W | Pearisburg | |
| 8 | The People's Bank of Eggleston | The People's Bank of Eggleston | June 5, 2017 (#100001043) | 181 Village St. 37°17′17″N 80°37′07″W | Eggleston | |
| 9 | Q. M. Pyne Store | Q. M. Pyne Store | March 13, 2009 (#09000121) | 168 Village St. 37°17′16″N 80°37′06″W | Eggleston | |
| 10 | Shannon Cemetery | Shannon Cemetery | May 4, 2006 (#06000350) | Junction of State Routes 42 and 100; 37°13′05″N 80°44′30″W | Pearisburg | |
| 11 | Walker's Creek Presbyterian Church | Walker's Creek Presbyterian Church | October 22, 2003 (#03001088) | State Route 42; also Walker's Creek Cemetery; 37°11′35″N 80°50′20″W | Pearisburg | Cemetery represents a boundary increase of February 1, 2006 |

== See also ==
- List of National Historic Landmarks in Virginia
- National Register of Historic Places listings in Virginia
