= WNRV =

- Narrows-Pearisburg, Virginia; United States
- Broadcast area: Narrows, Virginia; Giles County, Virginia
- Frequency: 990 kHz
- Branding: The Ridge

Programming
- Format: Bluegrass

Ownership
- Owner: Terry W Reed; (New River Interactive, LLC)

History
- First air date: 1953
- Call sign meaning: W New River Valley; W NaRrows Virginia

Technical information
- Licensing authority: FCC
- Facility ID: 67589
- Class: D
- Power: 5,000 watts day 10 watts night
- Transmitter coordinates: 37°20′39.0″N 80°46′36.0″W
- Translator: 97.3 W247DC (Narrows)

Links
- Public license information: Public file; LMS
- Webcast: Listen Live
- Website: wnrvbluegrassradio.com

WNRV (990 AM) is a Bluegrass formatted broadcast radio station licensed to Narrows-Pearisburg, Virginia, serving Narrows and Giles County, Virginia. WNRV is owned and operated by Terry W Reed, through licensee New River Interactive, LLC.
