= New River Rebels =

- 1946–1950; Narrows, Virginia

Minor league affiliations
- Class: Class D (1946–1950)
- League: Appalachian League (1946–1950)

Major league affiliations
- Team: Chicago White Sox (1946)

Minor league titles
- League titles (2): 1946; 1947

Team data
- Name: New River Rebels (1946–1950)
- Ballpark: Ragsdale Field (1946–1950)

The New River Rebels were a minor league baseball team representing Narrows, Virginia and Pearisburg, Virginia. From 1946 to 1950, the New River Rebels played as a member of the Class D level Appalachian League, winning league championships in 1946 and 1947. New River hosted home minor league games at Ragsdale Field in Narrows. The New River Rebels were a minor league affiliate of the Chicago White Sox in 1946.

== History ==
Minor league baseball began in Narrows, Virginia and neighboring Pearisburg, Virginia, when the New River Rebels joined the eight–team Appalachian League in 1946. The league expanded from a four–team league, adding four additional teams in 1946, including the New River Rebels. The New River ballclub was founded by player/owner Shannon Hardwick.

"I was interested in being in professional baseball, so I went to Columbus, Ohio, after I got out of the Navy in November of 1945," Hardwick, an area native, reflected in 1996. "The national baseball association was meeting there and I applied for the franchise and was successful in getting it for the New River Valley. A group of us incorporated, and I served as the business manager for the first three years."

In their first season of play, the 1946 New River Rebels won the league championship as an affiliate of the Chicago White Sox, playing under manager Jack Crosswhite. The Rebels completed the regular season with a record of 83–40, finishing ahead of league members Bluefield Blue–Grays (52–72), Bristol Twins (72–51), Elizabethton Betsy Cubs (68–57), Johnson City Cardinals (64–60), Kingsport Cherokees (55–70), Pulaski Counts (65–58) and Welch Miners (33–84).

During their first season, on July 19, 1946, New River played against the league all–stars in the All–Star game, due to the Rebels being in 1st place in Appalachian League standings at the break. The New River Rebels defeated the Appalachian League All-Stars 9–8 in the game, hosted at Ragsdale Field. The Rebels would remain in first place at the conclusion of the 1946 regular season.

In the 1946 playoffs, the New River Rebels defeated the Pulaski Counts 3 games to 2. In the league Finals, the New River Rebels defeated the Elizabethton Betsy Cubs 4 games to 2 and captured the 1946 Appalachian League Championship. In their initial season, the 1946 New River Rebels drew 39,037 fans, an average of 635 per home game. Owner Shannon Hardwick was also a pitcher, helping the 1946 Rebels with a 24–3 record and a 3.53 earned run average. His 1946 record also included a 19–game win streak.

The 1947 New River Rebels defended their Appalachian League Championship. The Rebels finished the regular season with a record of 64–60, to place 3rd in the standings, continuing play under manager Jack Crosswhite. In the playoffs, the New River Rebels defeated the Bluefield Blue-Grays 3 games to 1. In the 1947 Finals, the New River Rebels defeated the Pulaski Counts 4 games to 2 to claim their second consecutive championship. The season attendance was 39,596.

Playing under returning manager Jack Crosswhite in 1948 and 1949, the team finished with a 48–78 record to place 7th in 1948 and compiled a record of 52–69 to place 5th in 1949. The team missed the Appalachian League playoffs in both seasons.

The 1950 season was the New River Rebels final season in the Appalachian League. New River finished their final season of play with a record of 31–95 to place 8th, last in the league. The managers were Floyd Brooks and Worlise Knowles. Their attendance was 24,000 for the season, an average of 381. As attendance and sponsorship had both declined, the franchise folded.

The New River Rebels folded after the 1950 season, the cities have not hosted another minor league team. "Even though it didn't last too long there are some great memories," reflected team owner/player Shannon Hardwick.

== The ballpark ==
The New Rivers Rebels teams played minor league home games at Ragsdale Field. The ballpark was located at 125 Woodland Avenue in Narrows, Virginia, where the Narrows High School football stadium stands today. It was noted that the baseball home plate was located where the stadium scoreboard currently stands.

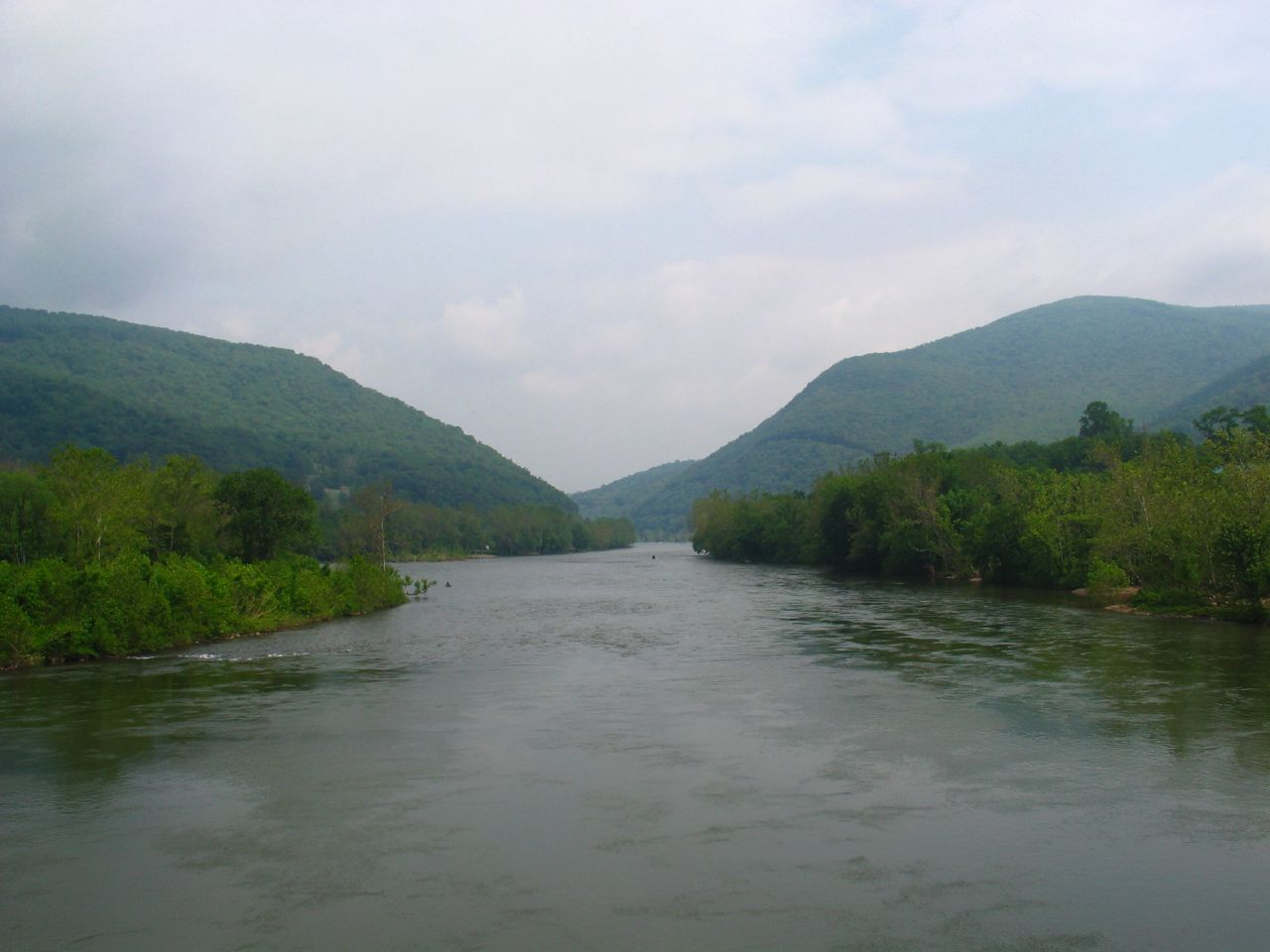
(2003) New River in Narrows, Virginia

== Timeline ==
Year(s)	# Yrs.	Team	Level	League	Affiliate	Ballpark
1946	1	New River Rebels	Class D	Appalachian League	Chicago White Sox	Regsdale Field
1947–1950	4	New River Rebels	Class D	Appalachian League	None	Regsdale Field

== Year–by–year records ==
Year	Record	Finish	Manager	Playoffs/Notes
1946	83–40	1st	Jack Crosswhite	Won pennant League champions
1947	64–60	3rd	Jack Crosswhite	League champions
1948	48–76	7th	Jack Crosswhite	Did not qualify
1949	52–69	5th	Jack Crosswhite	Did not qualify
1950	31–95	8th	Floyd Brooks / Worlise Knowles	Did not qualify

== Notable alumni ==
- Bob Bowman (1946)
- Harry Bushkar (1946)
- New River Rebels players
