= Doe Creek Farm =

- U.S. National Register of Historic Places
- U.S. Historic district
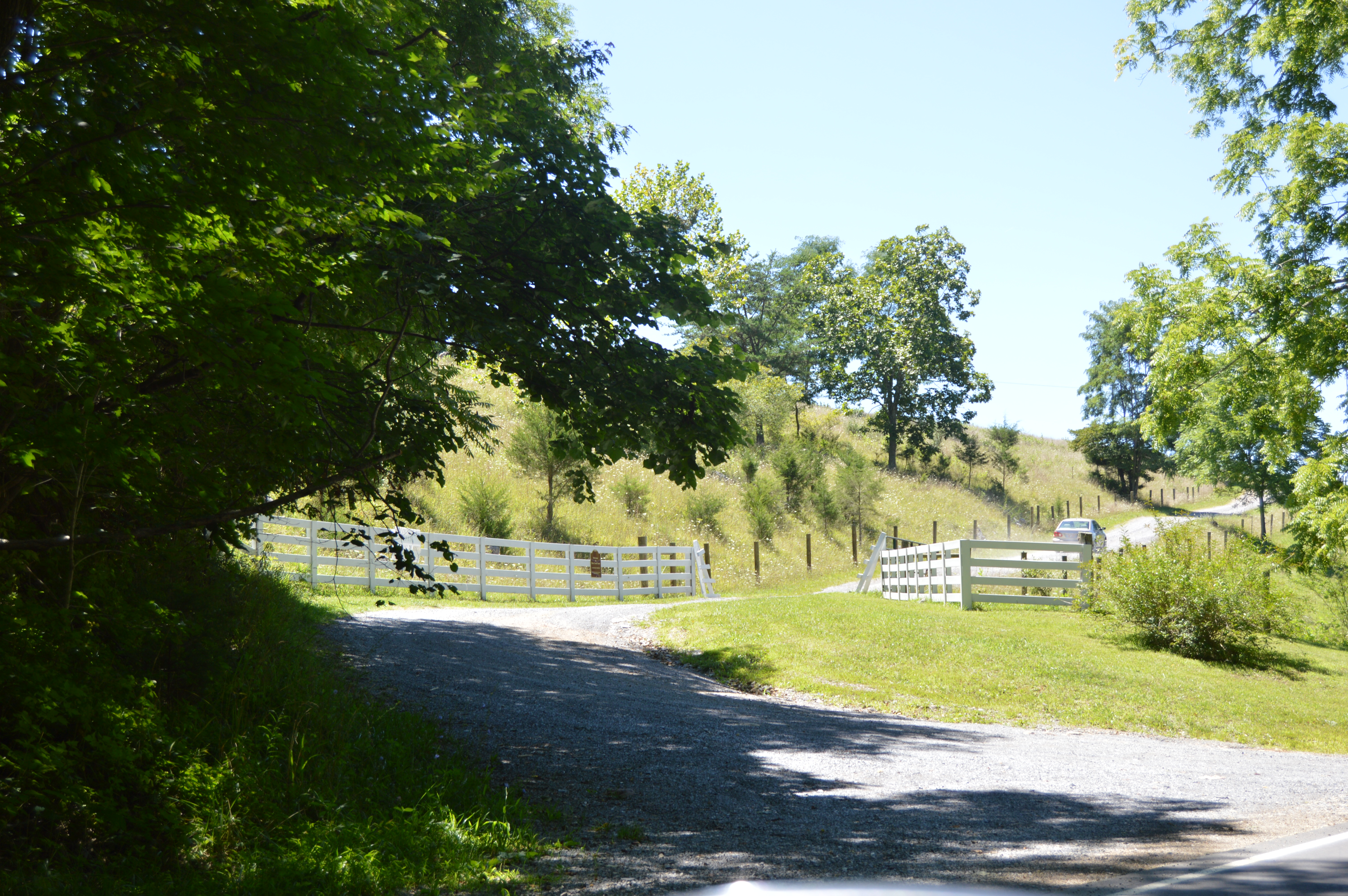
- The farm entrance

- Location within Virginia Location within the United States
- Location: 412 Doe Creek Farm Rd., near Pearisburg, Virginia
- Coordinates: 37°19′40″N 80°34′36″W
- Area: 415 acres (168 ha)
- Built: 1883
- Architectural style: Greek Revival
- NRHP reference No.: 100001079
- Added to NRHP: June 12, 2017

Doe Creek Farm is a historic farm property at 412 Doe Creek Farm Road in rural Giles County, Virginia. The farm, over 400 acres (160 ha) in size, is anchored by a Greek Revival farmhouse built in 1883, and includes several surviving 19th-century outbuildings, including a smokehouse and honey house. The property is a mix of woodland, pasture, and apple orchards. The farm was established as an orchard and stock farm in 1883 by Samuel and Mollie Hoge, on a plantation estate that had been in his father's hands (whose estate house has not survived). The farm was purchased from the Hoges in 1978 by William and Rosemary Freeman, and it is still owned and operated by Freeman family descendants. The farm has continuously operated as an apple orchard and stock farm since its establishment. The orchard was converted from a commercial to a U-Pick operation and the 1930s commercial packing house was converted to a wedding venue in 2013.

The farm was listed on the National Register of Historic Places in 2017.

== See also ==
- National Register of Historic Places listings in Giles County, Virginia
