= Mountain Lake (Virginia) =

Lake in Virginia, United States

- Salt Pond
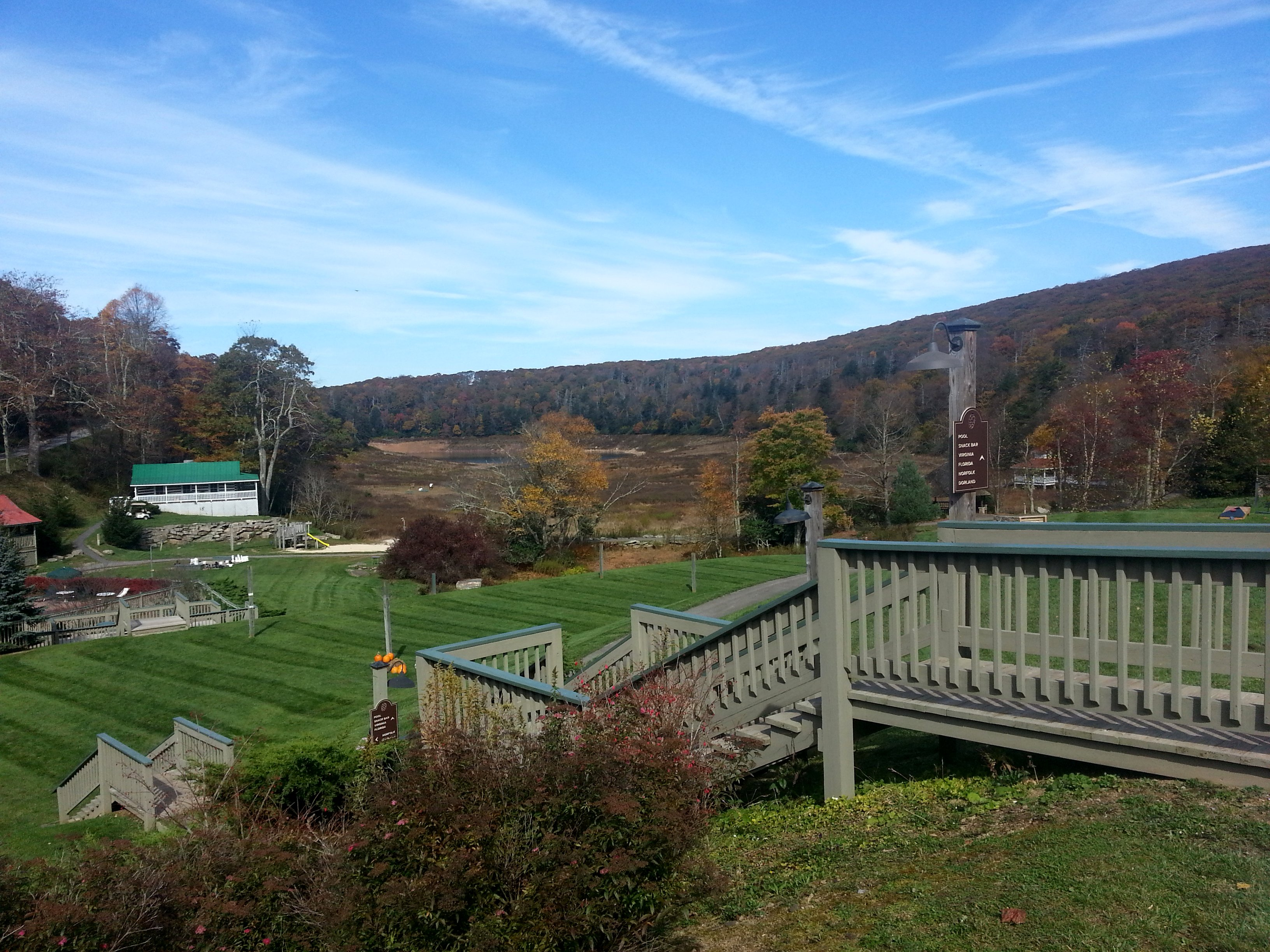

- Location within Virginia Location within the United States
- Location: Giles County, Virginia
- Coordinates: 37°21′36″N 80°32′02″W
- Basin countries: United States
- Surface area: 50 acres (20 ha)
- Max. depth: 110 ft (33.5 m)
- Surface elevation: 3,875 ft (1,181 m)

Mountain Lake is a freshwater lake located in Giles County near Newport, Virginia in the United States. Along with Lake Drummond in the Great Dismal Swamp, it is one of only two natural lakes in Virginia. It was originally known as Salt Pond, as it was where cattle were given salt.

The area is within the Mountain Lake Wilderness Cluster.

== Lake ==
Mountain Lake typically covers about 50 acres (200,000 m^{2}), and its level was largely constant at an elevation of 3,875 feet (1,181 m) during the 19th and 20th centuries. The first known written evidence of the lake was by Christopher Gist of the Ohio Land Surveying Company, in 1751. It subsequently became known as Salt Pond.

Natural lakes are common well to the north, where the Appalachian Range was subject to geologically recent glacial activity. But the basis on which this lake—the only natural one in the southern Appalachians—exists has been the source of much speculation. Recent scientific studies indicate that an unusual combination of natural processes created the lake, which is maintained by a fissure at the bottom that provides an outlet for both sediment and water and prevents the lake from otherwise simply becoming a bog. Replenishment of the water lost depends on rain levels, and apparent washing-out of sediment from the fissured bedrock bottom is causing the unstable lake levels.

The lake is estimated to be about 6,000 years old, and geologists believe it must have been formed by rock slides and damming. Cold underground springs feed the lake and rarely allow the temperature to rise above 70 °F (21 °C) on the surface and 46 °F (8 °C) fifty feet (15 m) below the surface. Because of narrow channels and openings in the lake bottom, the level has a history of changing dramatically depending on the water flow through these channels. It is more than 100 feet (30 m) deep when full.

Since 2002 it has been subject to dry-season level drops of as much as 15 feet (4.6 m). The last such level fluctuations occurred between 1751 and 1804 as historical accounts give widely different accounts of the lake size. From 2008 to 2020, Mountain Lake was nothing more than a reddish-brown pit, only partially filled with water. The lake's water levels had fluctuated dramatically over the previous 20 years. It first dropped in 1999, and returned to its normal levels in 2003. In 2006, it dropped again, and emptied completely for several days, leaving behind dead and rotting fish. From 2008 to 2012, it was mostly empty. However, resort employees noticed that the lake had begun to refill during a wet spring of 2020, and the lake had refilled to about a third full by July 14. During the lake's most recent dry period, researchers had examined the area's geology and concluded that the lake existed on a natural rise-and-fall cycle. During dry periods, accumulated sediment is believed to move through a natural plumbing system consisting of the aforementioned openings in the lake bottom. The lake is now believed to reach its lowest points on a roughly 400-year cycle.

Close to the lake is one of Virginia's few virgin forests, including a rare virgin spruce bog—Mann's Bog—with an unusual array of northern disjunct species. The lake drains into Little Stoney Creek, which passes over a spectacular waterfall known as The Cascades before reaching the New River.

During a severe cold wave in January 1985, Mountain Lake set the statewide record low for Virginia: −30 °F (−34 °C).

== Mountain Lake Lodge ==
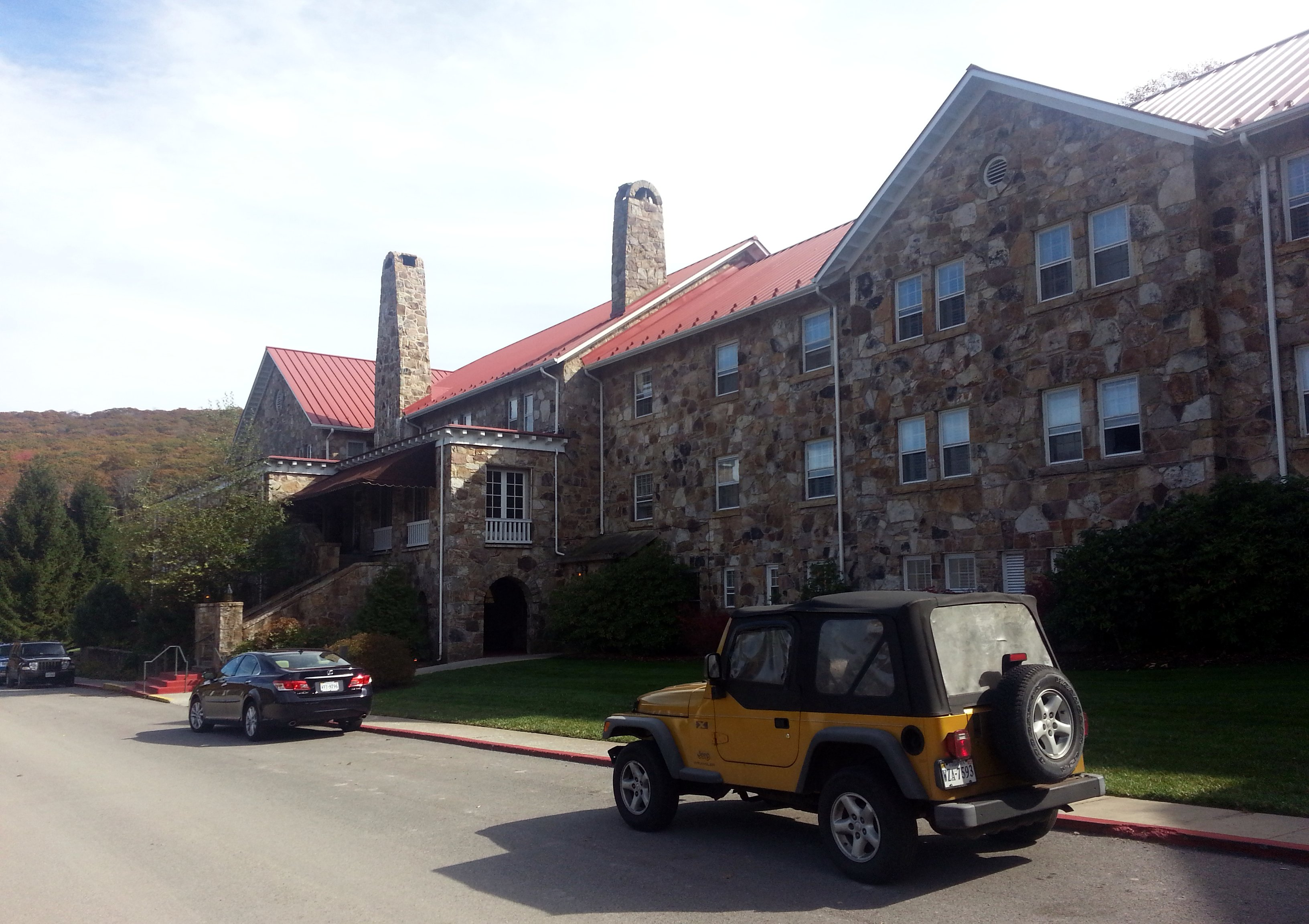
Photo of the north facade of the main building of the Mountain Lake Lodge in October 2013.

Salt Pond had been frequented throughout the early part of the 19th century and prior, then in March 1856, Henley Chapman incorporated the Mountain Lake Co. to provide accommodations and entertainment for its visitors. Soon afterward, a wooden hotel and a saw mill were built. Stagecoach travelers from Christiansburg, Virginia and Union, West Virginia were the primary customers in the days before the Virginia and Tennessee Railroad (a predecessor of the Norfolk and Western Railway) was built nearby in the late 1850s.

Following the Battle of Cloyd's Mountain in 1864, during the American Civil War (1861–1865), Union General George Crook marched his troops over to the present day town of Union, WV, via Salt Pond Mountain. Then, in 1869, following the Civil War, the hotel and its properties were sold to General and Mrs. Herman Haupt. Haupt had been head of the United States Military Railroad during the War. During their first year of ownership, though not operating publicly, the Haupts received compensation from some of their guests for the accommodations provided, prompting Giles County to require them to purchase a hotel license. Subsequently, they decided to re-open the hotel to the general public. Due to the resulting popularity of the hotel in this first season, several additions to the hotel were required to meet the increasing demand for more accommodations.

During the days of primary travel by railroad, guests of the resort exited the train at either Pembroke or Eggleston and were met by horse-drawn carriages, which transported them up the dirt Doe Creek Road to the resort. The current primary paved route up the Mountain, SR 700, was built later, over a different route than the old dirt road.

Giles County attorney Gordon Porterfield managed the property briefly before turning it over to his son Gilbert Porterfield, who managed the resort for 25 years. During Gilbert Porterfield's tenure managing the resort, its current reputation for fine cuisine was established. Also during this time, individuals were allowed to build their own cottages. They received a 15-year lease, after which the ownership of the cottages returned to the hotel. During their individual ownership, these guests also received discounts on their meals and maid service. Presently, most of the original cottage names that were established by the original owners/builders over 100 years ago are still in use.

In the 1930s, William Lewis Moody, Jr. of Galveston, Texas bought the hotel. In 1938, Moody replaced the wooden hotel with the current structure, built using stone native to the surrounding land. Moody's daughter, Mrs. Mary Moody Northen, owned the hotel until her death in 1986, following which the trustees of her estate established a foundation known as the Mary Moody Northen Endowment, which presently maintains and operates the resort. The foundation was specifically established according to Mrs. Northen's final wishes to maintain the hotel and surrounding land as she had always known it, without overbuilding and, particularly, without significantly changing the resort or upsetting the delicate ecology of the beautiful surrounding land. For most of its life as a resort, Mountain Lake Hotel was open from late spring through early fall, however, shortly after the establishment of the trust, the resort began operating year-round. Currently, it is open from early May to late November and operated by 1859 Historic Hotels Inc., a hotel management company controlled by the Moody Foundation, an entity separate from the Mary Moody Northen Endowment.

In the early 21st century, the lake levels diminished due to a prolonged drought in Southwest Virginia and the geology that makes up the bottom of the lake. In October 2008, the lake receded to a pond status, and remained mostly or completely dry until refilling in 2020. During this time, the remains of Samuel Ira Felder were discovered in the bottom of the lake. He drowned in July 1921 when he fell overboard while canoeing with friends.

=== Dirty Dancing ===
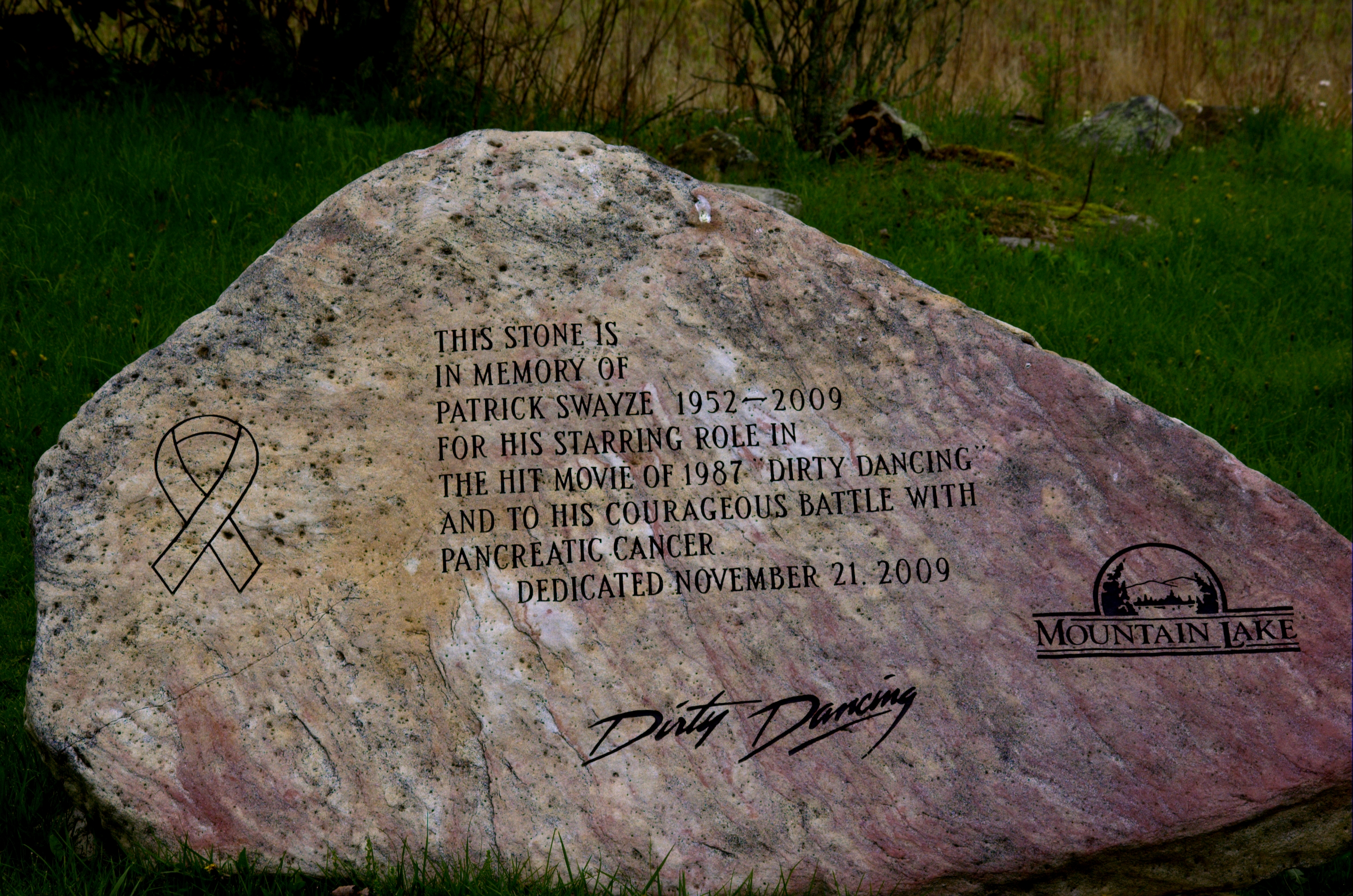
Memorial stone for Patrick Swayze dedicated in 2009, at Mountain Lake Hotel

Mountain Lake Hotel was the site for much of the on-location filming of the 1987 hit movie Dirty Dancing which starred Patrick Swayze and Jennifer Grey. The Stone Lodge stood in for "Kellerman's Resort", a fictional mountain retreat in the Catskill Mountains of upstate New York.

The other site was the 1927 Lake Lure Inn located in Lake Lure, North Carolina.

== Mountain Lake Biological Station ==
In addition to the Mountain Lake Hotel resort complex, the Mountain Lake Biological Station (MLBS), a field research and teaching station of the Biology Department at the University of Virginia originally established in 1930 is located nearby. The station is also home to the annual Silene Census which occurs in late May/early June and surveys plants in the genus Silene along roadsides surrounding the station, a project that has been ongoing since 1988. MLBS was the summer home of American author Edna Henry Lee Turpin (1867–1952).

== Mountain Lake Conservancy ==
The Mountain Lake Conservancy (formerly known as 'Wilderness Conservancy at Mountain Lake') is a non-profit organization founded to help manage and protect the 2,600 acres (11 km^{2}) of Mountain Lake property around Mountain Lake Hotel, and to provide environmental and cultural education for the public. Since 2008, the Conservancy has begun to manage and develop recreational opportunities for hotel guests and the local community.

== See also ==
- Mountain Lake Wilderness
