= Shannon Cemetery =

Historic cemetery in Virginia, United States

- U.S. National Register of Historic Places
- Virginia Landmarks Register
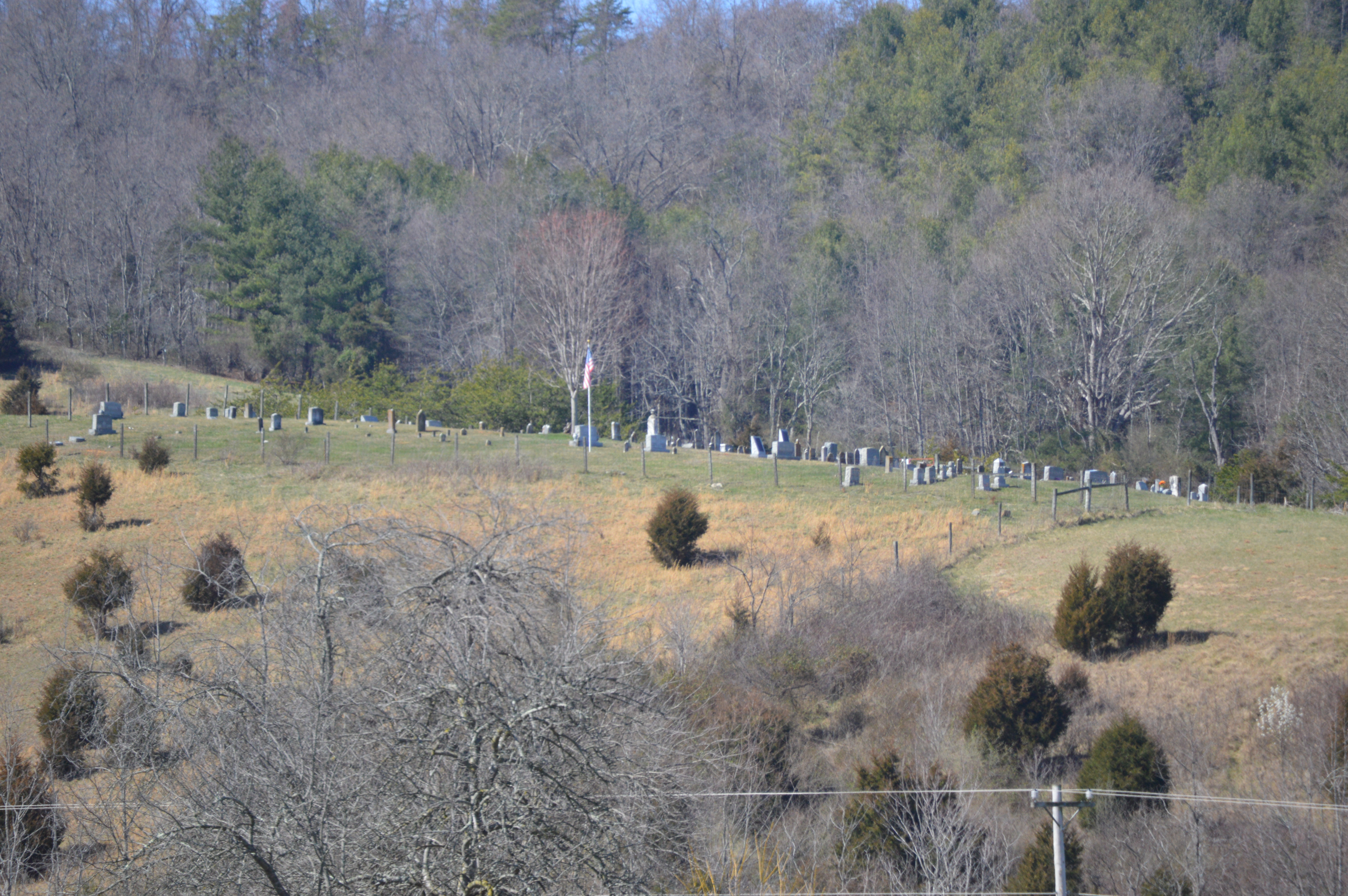
- Overview from the south

- Location within Virginia Location within the United States
- Location: Junction of State Routes 42 and 100, near Pearisburg, Virginia
- Coordinates: 37°13′4″N 80°44′30″W
- Area: Less than 1 acre (0.40 ha)
- Built by: B.F. Spyker
- NRHP reference No.: 06000350
- VLR No.: 035-5028

Significant dates
- Added to NRHP: May 4, 2006
- Designated VLR: March 8, 2006

Shannon Cemetery is a historic cemetery located near Pearisburg, Giles County, Virginia. It consists of two discontiguous sections, a white section and a black section, located approximately a thousand feet apart at about 1,900 feet in elevation above sea level. The white (south) section was established in 1781 and contains a variety of grave markers including inscribed and uninscribed fieldstones, decoratively carved tombstones of indigenous stone and imported marble, concrete markers, and twentieth century granite monuments. The black (north) section was established in the 19th century and has small uninscribed fieldstone markers and one professionally carved marble headstone. The Shannon Cemetery is believed to be the oldest maintained cemetery in the county.

It was listed on the National Register of Historic Places in 2006.
