= Staffordsville, Virginia =

Unincorporated community in Virginia, United States

- Unincorporated community
- Location within Shenandoah Valley Location within Virginia Location within the United States
- Coordinates: 37°14′29″N 80°43′00″W
- Country: United States
- State: Virginia
- County: Giles
- Elevation: 1,916 ft (584 m)
- Time zone: UTC−5 (Eastern (EST))
  - Summer (DST): UTC−4 (EDT)
- ZIP code: 24167
- Area code: 540
- GNIS feature ID: 1500147

Staffordsville is an unincorporated community in Giles County, Virginia, United States. Staffordsville is located along Virginia State Route 100 and Walker Creek, 6 miles (9.7 km) south of Pearisburg. Staffordsville has a post office with ZIP code 24167. The town is named after the Stafford family, who were early settlers of the area.
