= Kimballton, Virginia =

Unincorporated community in Virginia, United States

- Unincorporated community
- Location within Shenandoah Valley Location within Virginia Location within the United States
- Coordinates: 37°21′58″N 80°40′38″W
- Country: United States
- State: Virginia
- County: Giles
- Elevation: 1,686 ft (514 m)
- Time zone: UTC-5 (Eastern (EST))
  - Summer (DST): UTC-4 (EDT)
- Area code: 540
- GNIS feature ID: 1496965

Kimballton is an unincorporated community in Giles County, Virginia, United States. Kimballton is located on Stony Creek, 4.2 miles (6.8 km) northeast of Pearisburg. Virginia Tech's Kimballton Underground Research Facility (KURF), a low-background physics laboratory, is located in a limestone mine in Kimballton.
