= People's Bank of Eggleston =

Historic commercial building in Virginia, United States

- U.S. National Register of Historic Places
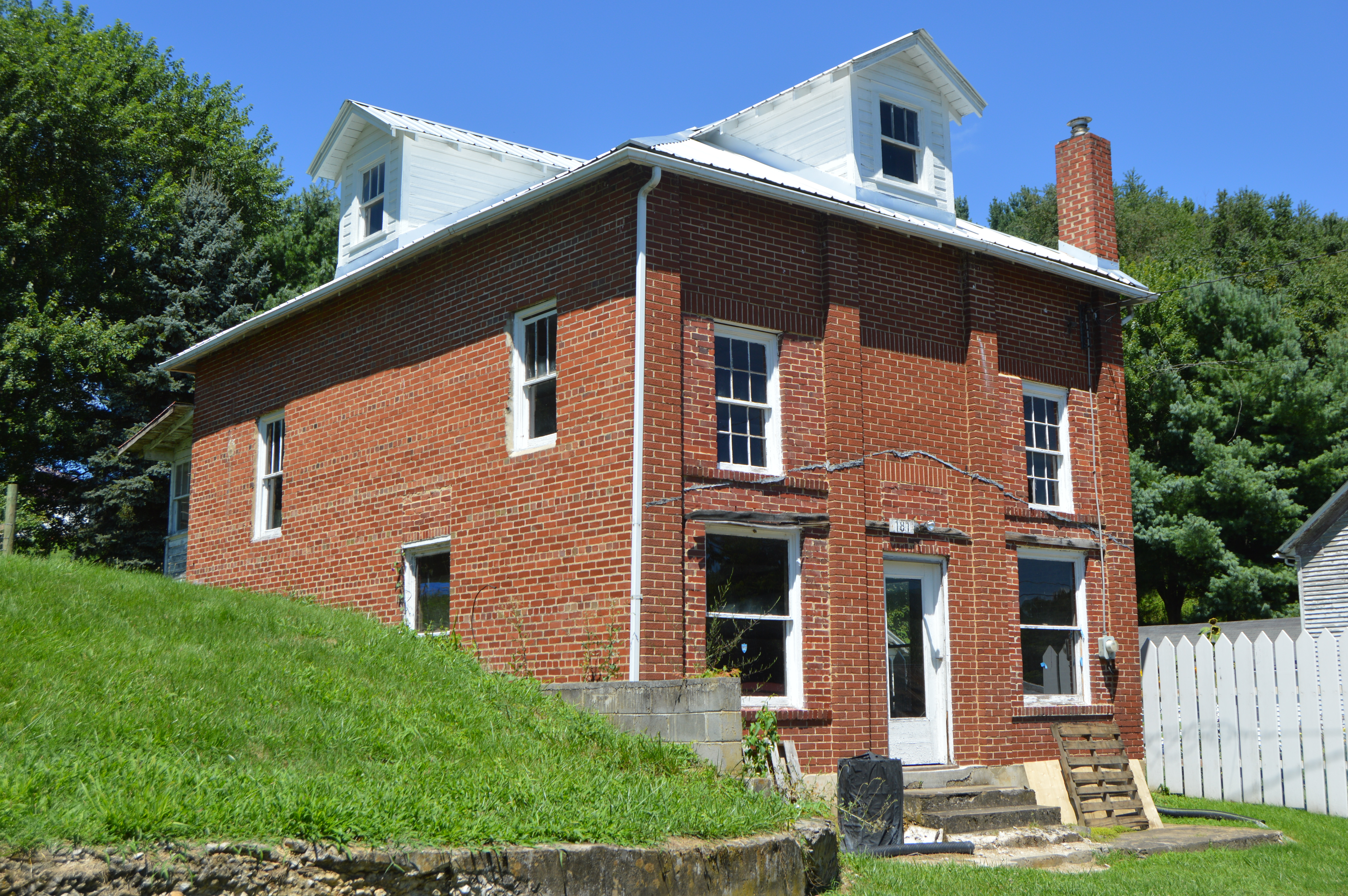
- 2017 photo

- Location within Virginia Location within the United States
- Location: 181 Village St., Eggleston, Virginia
- Coordinates: 37°17′17″N 80°37′7″W
- Built: 1925
- Architectural style: American Foursquare
- NRHP reference No.: 100001043
- Added to NRHP: June 5, 2017

The People's Bank of Eggleston is a historic bank building at 181 Village Street in the mountain hamlet of Eggleston, Virginia. It is a two-story brick building, stylistically resembling an American Foursquare house. It was built about 1925, the year the bank was founded, and was used by the bank until it failed in 1932, during the Great Depression. It is, along with the Q. M. Pyne Store, the only surviving reminder of commercial activity in the small community.

The building was listed on the National Register of Historic Places in 2017.
