= Andrew Johnston House =

Historic house in Virginia, United States

- U.S. National Register of Historic Places
- Virginia Landmarks Register
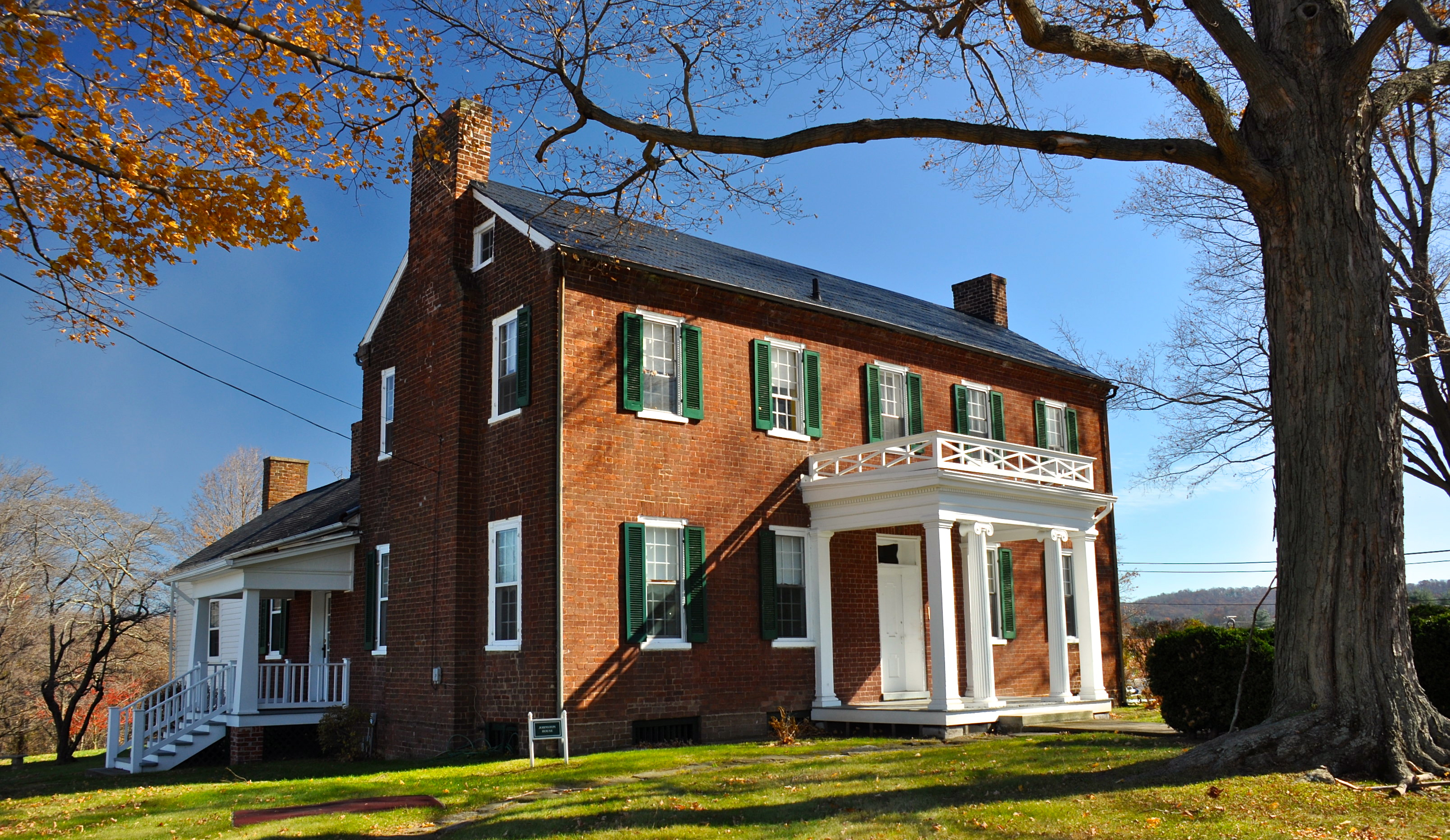
- The Andrew Johnston House in November 2013.

- Location within Virginia Location within the United States
- Location: 208 N. Main St., Pearisburg, Virginia
- Coordinates: 37°19′42″N 80°44′10″W
- Area: 1.4 acres (0.57 ha)
- Built: 1829
- Architectural style: Federal
- NRHP reference No.: 93000041
- VLR No.: 279-0001

Significant dates
- Added to NRHP: February 11, 1993
- Designated VLR: December 9, 1992

Andrew Johnston House is a historic home located at Pearisburg, Giles County, Virginia. The central block was built in 1829, and is a two-story, five-bay, central-passage plan, brick house over a low basement in the Federal style. It features a one-story, flat-roofed front portico topped by a balustrade and supported by two Ionic order and two Tuscan order columns. Also on the property is a small contributing outbuilding that was built as a doctor's office about 1857. The building houses the Giles County Historical Society, which uses it as a museum and research center.

It was listed on the National Register of Historic Places in 1993.
