= Pearisburg Historic District =

Historic district in Virginia, United States

- U.S. National Register of Historic Places
- U.S. Historic district
- Virginia Landmarks Register
- Location within Virginia Location within the United States
- Location: Roughly, Wenonah Ave. from Tazewell St. to Main St. and adjacent parts of N. and S. Main, Pearisburg, Virginia
- Coordinates: 37°19′35″N 80°44′6″W
- Area: 4 acres (1.6 ha)
- Architect: Mercer, Thomas
- Architectural style: Colonial Revival, Romanesque Revival, Federal
- NRHP reference No.: 92000004
- VLR No.: 279-0012

Significant dates
- Added to NRHP: January 30, 1992
- Designated VLR: December 11, 1991

Pearisburg Historic District is a national historic district located at Pearisburg, Giles County, Virginia. It encompasses 18 contributing buildings and 1 contributing site in the town of Pearisburg, county seat of Giles County. The district is centered on the Public Square and includes a mix of commercial, institutional, and governmental buildings. Notable buildings include the First National Bank of Pearisburg (1906), Western Hotel (Thomas Building, c. 1827), Pearis Theater (1940), Giles County Sheriff's Office and Jail (1937–38), St. Elizabeth Hospital Building (1920), Giles County Motor Company Building (1923–1924), and Christ Episcopal Church (1910). The Giles County Courthouse is listed separately.

It was listed on the National Register of Historic Places in 1992.
