= Goldbond =

Goldbond may refer to:

- Gold Bond, a skin care product
- Goldbond, Virginia, a place in the United States
