= Walker's Creek Presbyterian Church =

Historic church in Virginia, United States

- U.S. National Register of Historic Places
- Virginia Landmarks Register
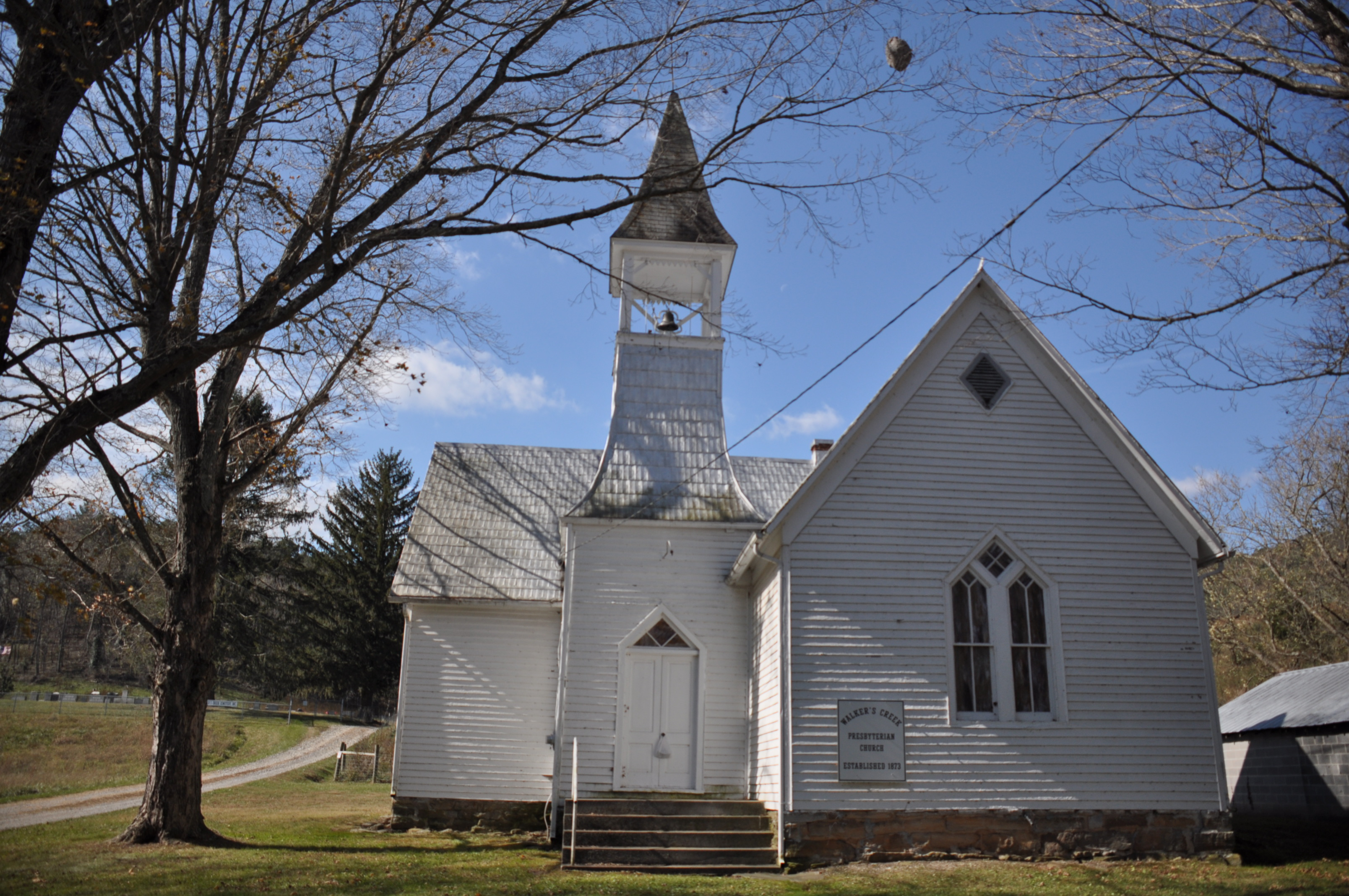
- Walker's Creek Presbyterian Church in October 2013. Contributing church cemetery is located up the road on the left hand side.

- Location within Virginia Location within the United States
- Location: Walker's Creek Valley Rd.; also Walker's Creek Cemetery, Pearisburg, Virginia
- Coordinates: 37°11′39″N 80°50′20″W
- Area: 0.1 acres (0.040 ha)
- Built: 1898, 1911
- Architect: Bane, George Lloyd (builder); Walker's Ck. P.C. Ladies Aid Society
- Architectural style: Gothic Revival
- NRHP reference No.: 03001088, 05001622 (Boundary Increase)
- VLR No.: 035-0420

Significant dates
- Added to NRHP: October 22, 2003, February 1, 2006 (Boundary Increase)
- Designated VLR: June 18, 2003, December 7, 2005

Walker's Creek Presbyterian Church is a historic Presbyterian church and cemetery located near Pearisburg, Giles County, Virginia. The church was built in 1897–1898, and is a one-story, L-shaped, frame building in the Gothic Revival style. It features a metal-sheathed gable roof, painted poplar weatherboard siding, a sandstone foundation, and an entry / bell tower. The adjacent church cemetery was established in 1911.

It was listed on the National Register of Historic Places in 2003, with a boundary increase in 2006.
