= Goldbond, Virginia =

Unincorporated community in Virginia, United States

- Unincorporated community
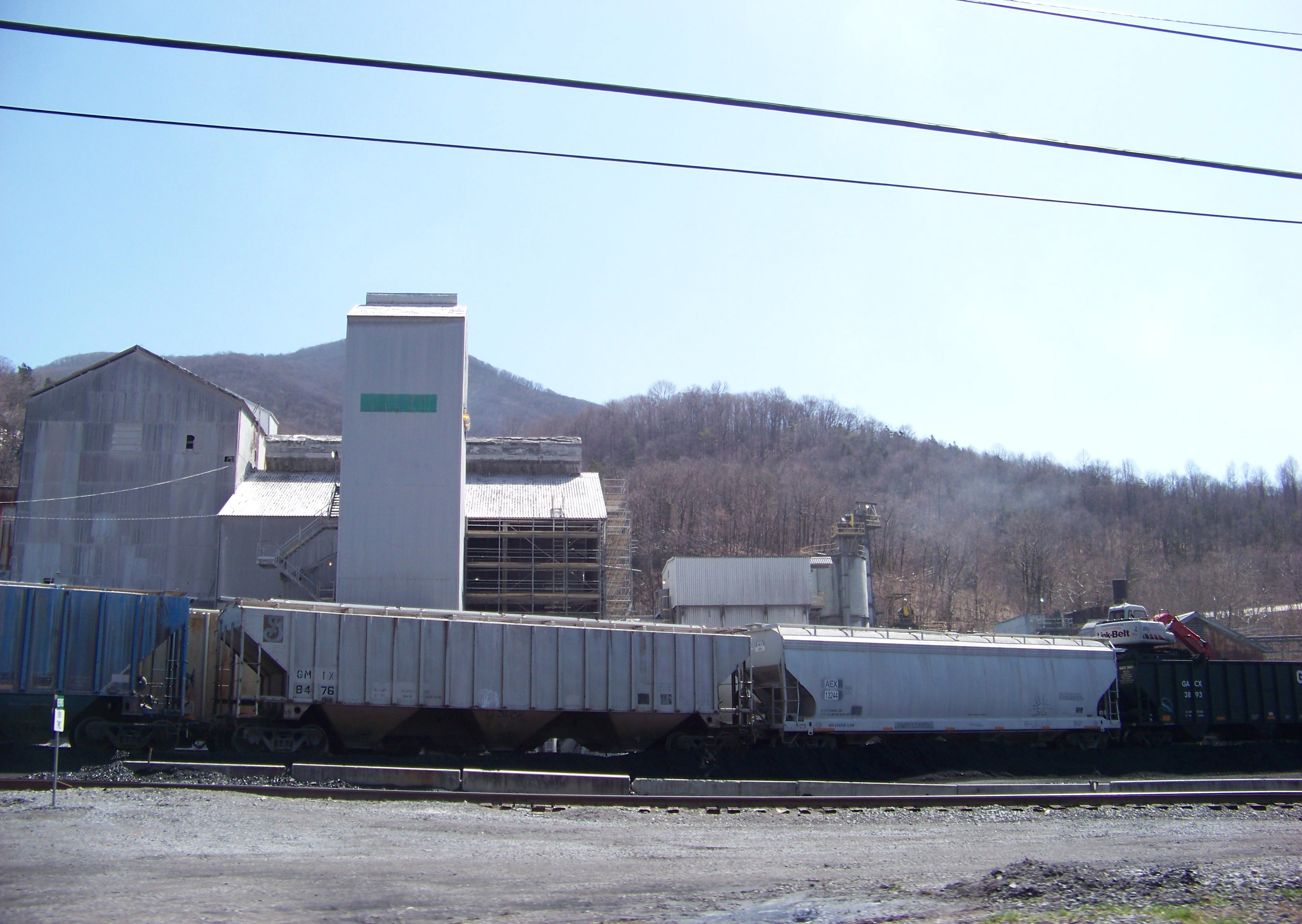
- Coal train in Goldbond

- Location within Shenandoah Valley Location within Virginia Location within the United States
- Coordinates: 37°22′48″N 80°39′59″W
- Country: United States
- State: Virginia
- County: Giles
- Elevation: 1,788 ft (545 m)
- Time zone: UTC-5 (Eastern (EST))
  - Summer (DST): UTC-4 (EDT)
- ZIP code: 24150
- Area code: 540
- GNIS feature ID: 1483687

Goldbond is an unincorporated community in Giles County, Virginia, United States.

Goldbond is located on Stony Creek and State Route 635, 5.3 miles (8.5 km) northeast of Pearisburg. The name Goldbond derives from an earlier limestone processing works situated in the community, National Gypsum Company, which produced 'Gold Bond' gypsum wallboard. Prior to the company's presence, the area was known as Kerns, Virginia, after the Kern's Bread Company which once operated there.

Archaeological evidence collected by locals along with area history suggests the community that is now Goldbond saw military action or at least preparation during the Civil War; however, no official markers note this at present.

Notable landmarks in the area include two family cemeteries (those of the Moser and Reed Families), a covered mill, a former elementary school (now a private residence), and a former local store which also served as a community U.S. Post Office until its closing on July 30, 2005. Prior to moving to a community post office format Goldbond's post office, which opened February 21, 1923, was operated on land belonging to the Reed Family. This first office was later shifted to the home of Postmasters Irene Moser (née Reed) and Tyree Moser, Sr. in whose family postal operations of the community ran for more than 60 years as noted in an extensive article in the area's newspaper, the 'Virginian Leader,' on the occasion of the couple's retirement and the office's moving in the early 1990s.^{[1]}
