= Narrows Commercial Historic District =

Historic district in Virginia, United States

- U.S. National Register of Historic Places
- U.S. Historic district
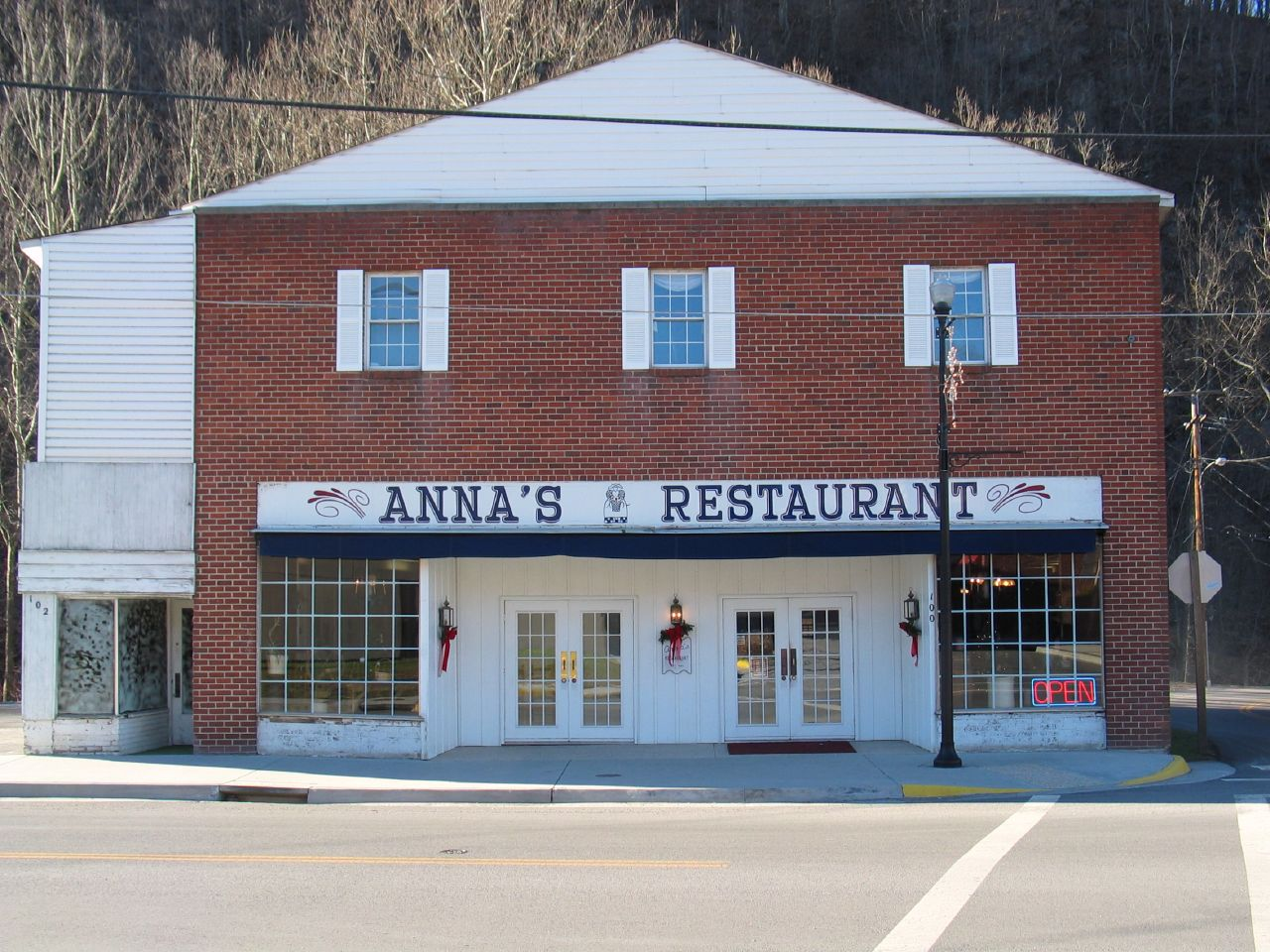

- Location within Virginia Location within the United States
- Location: 100-300 blk. Main, 100 blk. Mary, 100 blk. Monroe & 100 blk. Center Sts., 100 blk. MacArthur Ln., Narrows, Virginia
- Coordinates: 37°19′53″N 80°48′41″W
- Area: 14.67 acres (5.94 ha)
- Built: 1882
- Architect: Multiple
- Architectural style: Multiple
- NRHP reference No.: 14000301
- Added to NRHP: June 3, 2014

The Narrows Commercial Historic District encompasses the historic commercial heart of Narrows, Virginia. It is centered at the intersection of Main and Monroe Streets and MacArthur Lane, near the confluence of Wolf Creek and the New River. The area's major development did not begin until after the arrival in 1882 of the railroad, with most of it taking place in the two decades before World War II. Major buildings include the 1927 Norfolk and Western Railroad depot and the 1940 General Macarthur Hotel.

The district was listed on the National Register of Historic Places in 2014.

== See also ==
- National Register of Historic Places listings in Giles County, Virginia
