= Burgess Macneal =

American electrical engineer, recording engineer and inventor

- Born: Baltimore, MD
- Known for: Invention of Parametric EQ

Burgess Macneal is an American electrical engineer, recording engineer and inventor. He is most widely known for his role in the invention of parametric equalization and operation/ownership of the Sontec and ITI brands.

== Early years ==
Burgess Macneal attended an engineering-focused high school in Baltimore, MD. Prior to graduation, he began working for the Baltimore Symphony as a recording engineer and later took on additional duties as a broadcast engineer.

After importing of the first Neumann microphone into the United States of America, Macneal and other business partners founded a recording studio named Recordings Incorporated. In addition to recording services, the studio offered mono fusion vinyl record pressing. Later, the studio relocated its record pressing operations to Baltimore's "District Steam" which supplied industrial-pressure steam, allowing for an upgrade to steam vinyl pressing machines. The studio also offered vinyl cutting on one of Neumann's earliest manual lathes.

== Invention of Parametric EQ ==
Dean Jensen and George Massenburg came to Macneal's studio to help with the building of a console. George Massenburg was around 15 years of age at the time. Soon after beginning on the console, Macneal and his business partner decided to part ways and Recordings Incorporated was absorbed by a company named ITI (International Telecomm Incorporated). Burgess Macneal was named Vice President.

Burgess Macneal continued working with ITI and hired George Massenburg. Together they began creating a new prototype recording console for ITI. During the building of the console, around 1966, Macneal and Massenburg conceptualized an idea for a sweep-tunable EQ that would avoid inductors and switches. In approximately 1967, an engineer attending Princeton University named Bob Meushaw, a friend of Massenburg, built a three-band, frequency adjustable, fixed-Q, IC op-amp-based EQ based on passive 2 resistor/2 capacitor or 3 resistor/3 capacitor “T” filters (a design that was primarily from a 1940s Bell Labs filter handbook). Meushaw’s design provided further inspiration for the EQ concept that Macneal and Massenburg were designing. While working on the design of the circuit, Massenburg had a marked breakthrough and together with an input amplifier built by ITI’s chief engineer, the concept was functional around 1969.

Macneal and Massenberg attended the 1971 AES convention in New York and debuted the new equalizer, generating industry-wide interest and demand. The ITI engineering manager and shareholders decided to manufacture only 10 a month to keep the units scarce. The original unit was sold as the ITI MEP-130 (Mastering Equalizer Potentiometer 130) and was a console module. The original stand-alone unit was called the ITI ME-230 (Mastering Equalizer 230) and was the first commercially available parametric EQ. Massenburg and Macneal type-set and printed a paper entitled “Parametric Equalization” in 1972 and Massenburg submitted it to the Audio Engineering Society in Los Angeles. The design was never patented.

== Purchase of ITI and Creation of Sontec ==

Partly due to a refusal of the ITI engineering department to manufacture the prototyped recording consoles, ITI slid into financial difficulties. George Massenburg and the company’s salesman left. In 1974 the bank working with ITI decided to shut it down and auctioned the company assets in January 1975. At the auction George Massenburg (with Earth, Wind & Fire’s backing) bought the music recording studio and a company in Nashville bought the mastering studio. John Ariosa from Sheffield Recordings bought the voice over production studio which included the ITI EQ Prototype as well as several Little Feat masters, and further down the road bought the ITI console after it sank in the Baltimore harbor. Burgess Macneal bought the vinyl pressing plant, equalizers, intellectual property and other property of ITI and consequently became the owner of the ITI brand.

Macneal continued some of the ITI operations, rehired many of the ITI staff and renamed the brand as Sontec. The first purchaser of the Sontec EQ was Sterling Sound, which still use their Sontecs at their facility. Sontec EQs are used in most of the world’s major mastering studios including Masterdisk in Manhattan and the Capitol Records mastering studio located in the iconic Capitol Records Building in Los Angeles. Sontec products have been in production since the spring of 1975, with ongoing development.

Macneal has relocated his residence and business operations from Baltimore, Maryland to Pearisburg, Virginia.

== Sontec Compudisk ==
Burgess Macneal and, software programmer, Gerry Block created the impressively precise Sontec Compudisk pitch and depth automation controller for disc cutting lathes, which they debuted at the 1980 AES Convention. The Neumann VMS-80 appeared at the same convention, which made it difficult for people to decide whether to upgrade the whole lathe, or just improve their existing lathe's automation. The most famous studio to adopt the Compudisk was The Mastering Lab, which added one to their highly modified vintage Neumann lathes. They added an entraining bar which connected the carriages of three lathes so that the master lathe's Compudisk could move the carriages of all three lathes identically. Depth coils of the three lathes were operated electrically, in parallel, using the one controller for base depth and automated depth gain. The Compudisk cost about 3 times as much as the Zuma, but both greatly improved on the space-saving capabilities of previous designs.
