= Q. M. Pyne Store =

Historic commercial building in Virginia, United States

- U.S. National Register of Historic Places
- Virginia Landmarks Register
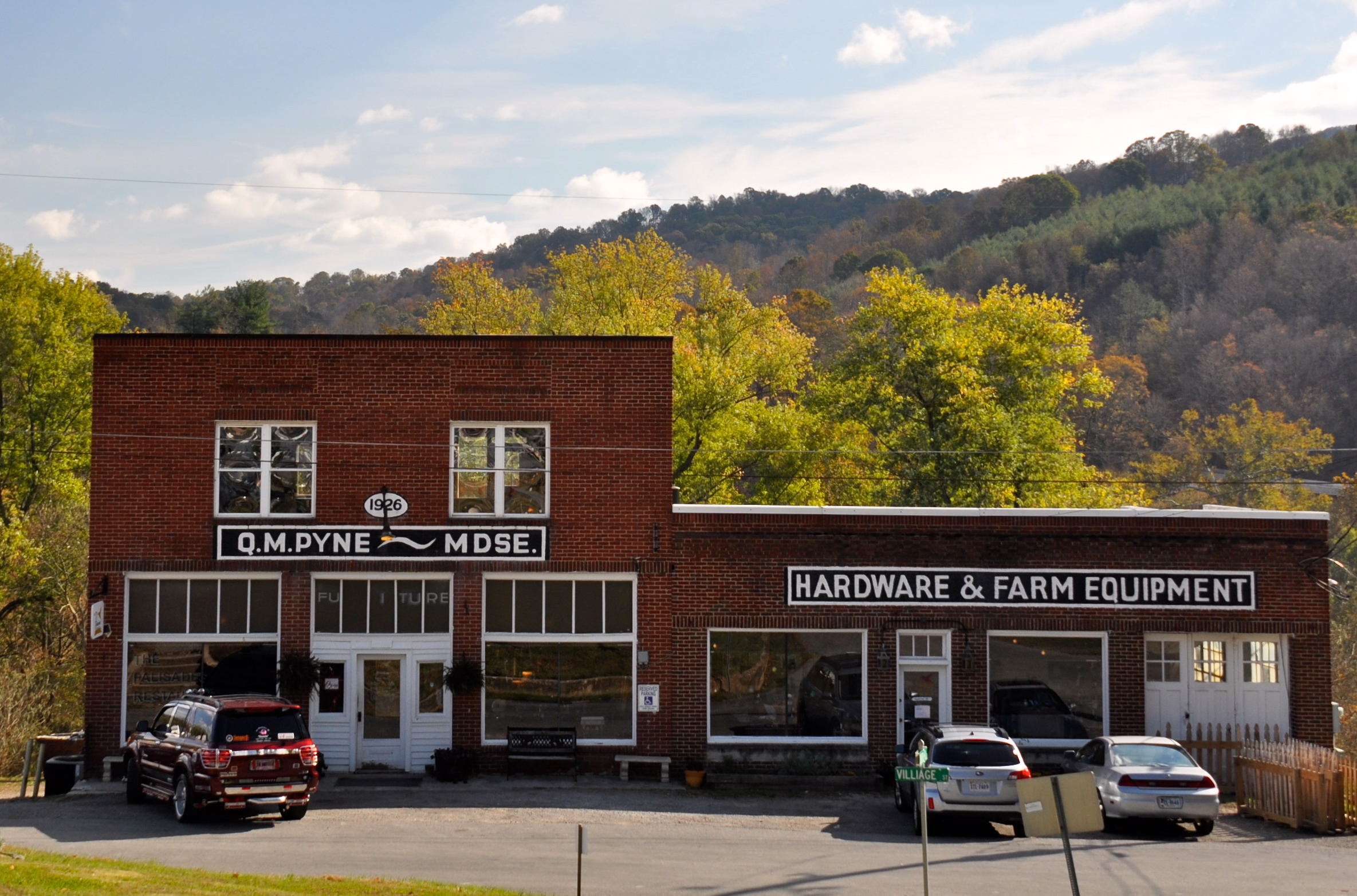
- Q.M. Pyne Store in October, 2013

- Location within Virginia Location within the United States
- Location: 168 Village St., Eggleston, Virginia
- Coordinates: 37°17′15″N 80°37′7″W
- Area: less than one acre
- Built: 1926
- Architectural style: Early Commercial
- NRHP reference No.: 09000121
- VLR No.: 035-5049

Significant dates
- Added to NRHP: March 13, 2009
- Designated VLR: December 18, 2008

Q. M. Pyne Store, also known as the Palisades Restaurant, is a historic country store located at Eggleston, Giles County, Virginia. It consists of two multi-story, brick masonry structures, attached side by side and embanked into a hillside. The north building was completed in 1926 and appended with a similar building on the south side about 1929. The north building is three stories and measures 70 feet deep and 40 feet wide. It has a flat roof, parapet and sign tablet, with a windowed storefront below. The building housed C.C. Whittaker & Company, a general store; a Chevrolet Dealership, with a showroom and a place to repair cars; a doctor's office; and the United States Post Office until it moved to its new location in the 1980s.

It was listed on the National Register of Historic Places in 2009.
