= Giles County Courthouse =

Historic courthouse in Virginia, US

- U.S. National Register of Historic Places
- U.S. Historic district – Contributing property
- Virginia Landmarks Register
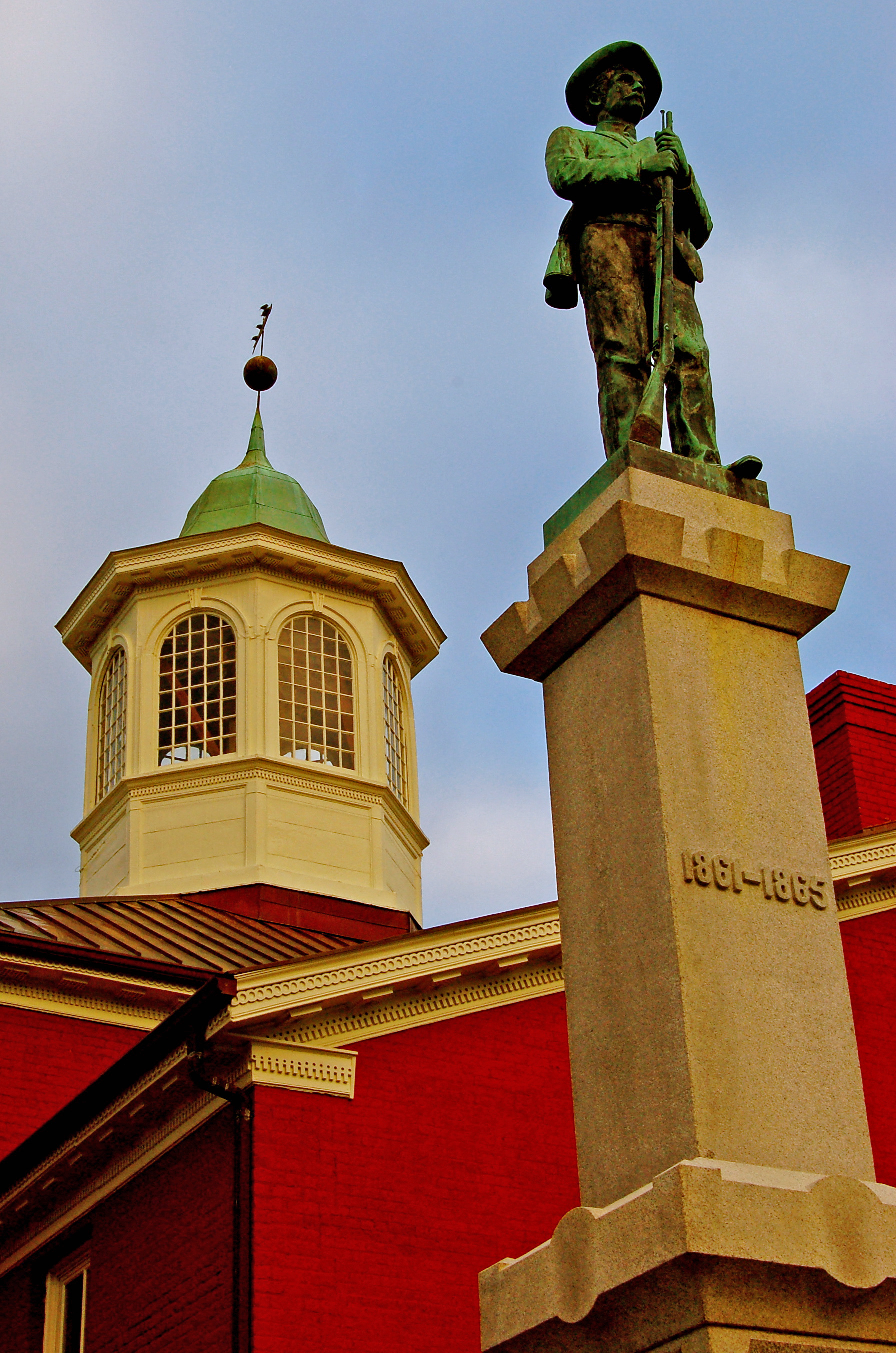
- Giles County Courthouse, December 2007

- Location within Virginia Location within the United States
- Interactive map showing the location of Files County Courthouse
- Location: VA 100 and US 460, Pearisburg, Virginia
- Coordinates: 37°19′36″N 80°44′6″W
- Area: 1 acre (0.40 ha)
- Built: 1836
- Built by: Mercer, Thomas
- Architectural style: Federal
- NRHP reference No.: 82004560
- VLR No.: 279-0003

Significant dates
- Added to NRHP: September 9, 1982
- Designated VLR: July 20, 1982

Giles County Courthouse is a historic county courthouse located at Pearisburg, Giles County, Virginia. The central block was built in 1836, and is a two-story, rectangular, brick building in the Federal style. It was originally T-shaped, but flanking wings were added soon after its original construction. It has a steep, hipped roof with a large octagonal cupola at its apex. A two-story portico was added about 1900, as was a two-story hyphen and three-story rear addition.

It was listed on the National Register of Historic Places in 1982. It is located in the Pearisburg Historic District.
