= Harry Bushkar =

American athlete (1925–2008)

Harry Bushkar Jr. (April 9, 1925 – September 1, 2008) was three-sport star at Virginia Tech (known then as Virginia Polytechnic Institute) in the 1940s, who went on to a short stint in minor league baseball. He was well known for officiating college and high school sporting events, and was commissioner of the western Virginia Football Officials Association. He was elected to the Virginia Tech Sports Hall of Fame in 1986.

== Early life ==
Bushkar was born in Russia in a small town near Leningrad (now St. Petersburg). His family moved to the United States when he was a small child and he grew up in Logan, West Virginia.

== College basketball career ==
In his first season at Virginia Polytechnic Institute (VPI) in 1942–43, Bushkar was promoted to varsity after the Southern Conference ruled that freshmen were eligible. A 5-foot-8-inch (1.73 m) guard, he was named Virginia's college basketball player of the year by the Associated Press (AP) in 1945 despite playing on a losing team. Bushkar ended his career by being named Virginia's Player of the Year and making the All-Southern Conference team in 1945–46. He was named to the AP all-state first team for the third straight season. He also made the Southern Conference All-Tournament Team. He was captain of the 1944, 1945 and 1946 Tech teams.

== College baseball career ==
Bushkar played shortstop and pitched on occasion for the Gobblers. He showed great potential on defense as a smooth fielding shortstop. Offensively, he could hit for power.

== College football career ==
Bushkar played college football on VPI's freshman team, and scored four touchdowns on the undefeated team. The school did not field a football team in the following two years. In June 1945, he graduated with a Bachelor of Science in business administration. Enrolled at VPI as a post-graduate student in fall 1945, the fullback Bushkar was the lone non-freshman on the varsity team.

== Baseball career ==
In March 1946, Bushkar withdrew from his post-graduate work and signed a baseball contract with the New York Yankees to play with the Norfolk Tars in the minor league Class B Piedmont League. He did not play any games for the Tars. His first game was with the Class D Chicago White Sox organization for the Appalachian League member New River Rebels. He played 116 games for the Rebels in 1946, and sported a .336 batting average, hit 13 home runs, and had a .518 slugging percentage for the league champions. In 1947, he moved to the Chicago Cubs organization, and up to the Class C Hutchinson Cubs of the Western Association league. He hit 10 home runs to lead the team, and had a .283 batting average. His performance earned him a promotion to the Class B New England League in 1948, where he played for the Springfield Cubs. In his final full season of minor league ball, he hit .235 with four home runs. He attempted a comeback in 1951 with the Roanoke Ro-Sox of the Class B Piedmont League where he played only 19 games and hit his final professional home run while compiling a .192 average.
