= Narrows, Virginia =

Town of Narrows, Virginia
- Town
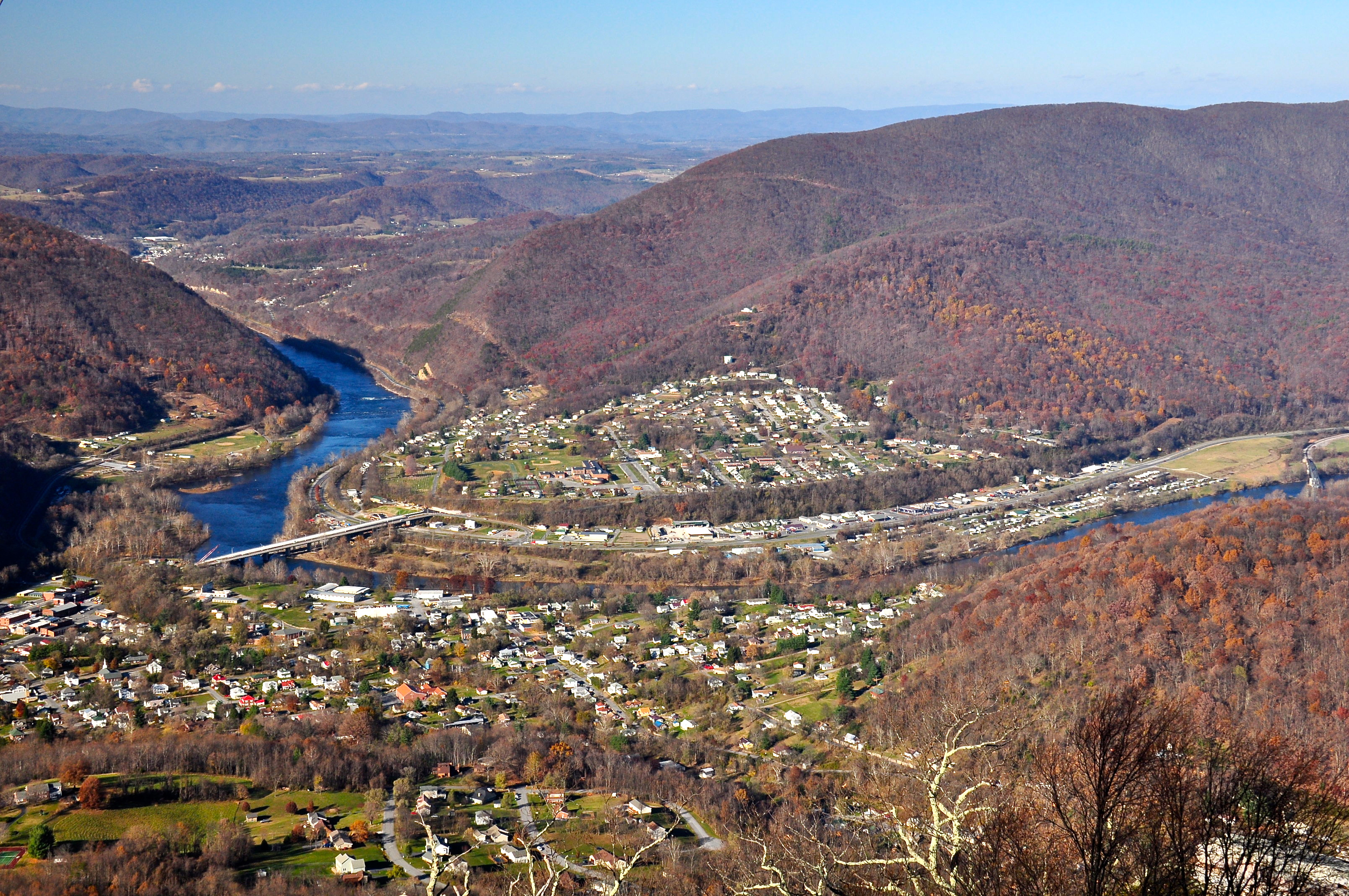
- Narrows, Virginia in November 2013.

- Location within Shenandoah Valley Location within Virginia Location within the United States
- Coordinates: 37°19′55″N 80°48′31″W
- Country: United States
- State: Virginia
- County: Giles

Government
  - Mayor: John Davis

Area
  - Total: 1.34 sq mi (3.47 km^{2})
  - Land: 1.27 sq mi (3.28 km^{2})
  - Water: 0.073 sq mi (0.19 km^{2}) 4.5%
- Elevation: 1,545 ft (471 m)

Population (2020)
  - Total: 2,093
  - Estimate (2019): 1,952
  - Density: 1,541.1/sq mi (595.04/km^{2})
- U.S. Census Bureau, 2010 Census Count
- Time zone: UTC−5 (EST)
  - Summer (DST): UTC−4 (EDT)
- ZIP code: 24124
- Area code: 540
- FIPS code: 51-54904
- GNIS feature ID: 1497034
- Website: https://townofnarrows.org/

Narrows, named for the narrowing of the New River that flows through the town, is a town in Giles County, Virginia, United States. As of the 2020 census, Narrows had a population of 2,093. It is part of the Blacksburg-Christiansburg metropolitan area.

== Geography ==
Narrows is located at 37°19′55″N 80°48′31″W (37.331818, −80.808477).

The town is just north of the Mill Creek (conservation area), an area in the Jefferson National Forest designated by the Wilderness Society as a "Mountain Treasure".

According to the United States Census Bureau, the town has a total area of 1.3 square miles (3.5 km^{2}), of which 1.3 square miles (3.3 km^{2}) is land and 0.1 square mile (0.2 km^{2}) (4.48%) is water.

== Demographics ==
Historical population
Census	Pop.	Note	%±
1910	975		—
1920	1,141		17.0%
1930	1,345		17.9%
1940	1,489		10.7%
1950	2,520		69.2%
1960	2,508		−0.5%
1970	2,421		−3.5%
1980	2,516		3.9%
1990	2,082		−17.2%
2000	2,111		1.4%
2010	2,029		−3.9%
2020	2,093		3.2%
U.S. Decennial Census

Detailed breakdowns of the 2010 census numbers are not yet available.

At the 2000 census there were 2,111 people, 890 households, and 600 families in the town. The population density was 1,649.7 people per square mile (636.8/km^{2}). There were 971 housing units at an average density of 758.8 per square mile (292.9/km^{2}). The racial makeup of the town was 98.86% White, 0.24% African American, 0.05% Native American, 0.05% Asian, 0.28% from other races, and 0.52% from two or more races. Hispanic or Latino of any race were 0.43%.

Of the 890 households 27.9% had children under the age of 18 living with them, 53.1% were married couples living together, 10.3% had a female householder with no husband present, and 32.5% were non-families. 29.6% of households were one person and 16.2% were one person aged 65 or older. The average household size was 2.35 and the average family size was 2.90.

The age distribution was 22.9% under the age of 18, 7.2% from 18 to 24, 28.3% from 25 to 44, 23.3% from 45 to 64, and 18.4% 65 or older. The median age was 39 years. For every 100 females, there were 85.0 males. For every 100 females aged 18 and over, there were 81.5 males.

The median household income was $31,875 and the median family income was $42,610. Males had a median income of $31,806 versus $22,222 for females. The per capita income for the town was $17,933. About 5.4% of families and 8.7% of the population were below the poverty line, including 11.4% of those under age 18 and 11.9% of those age 65 or over.

== History ==
Settled as early as 1778, a post office was opened in 1873 and the town was incorporated in 1904.

From 1946 to 1950, the New River Rebels were a minor league baseball team representing Narrows and Pearisburg, Virginia . The New River Rebels were a member of the Class D Appalachian League from 1946 to 1950. The Rebels captured Appalachian League Championships in 1946 and 1947. The New River Rebels were an affiliate of the Chicago White Sox in 1946 and played at Ragsdale Field.

On December 22, 1996, Airborne Express Flight 827 crashed in Narrows, killing all six people on board.

The Narrows Commercial Historic District was added to the National Register of Historic Places in 2014.

== Education ==
The Giles County Public Schools includes the Narrows High School.
