= Narrows High School =

Public high school in Virginia, US

Coordinates: 37.337707°N 80.804359°W

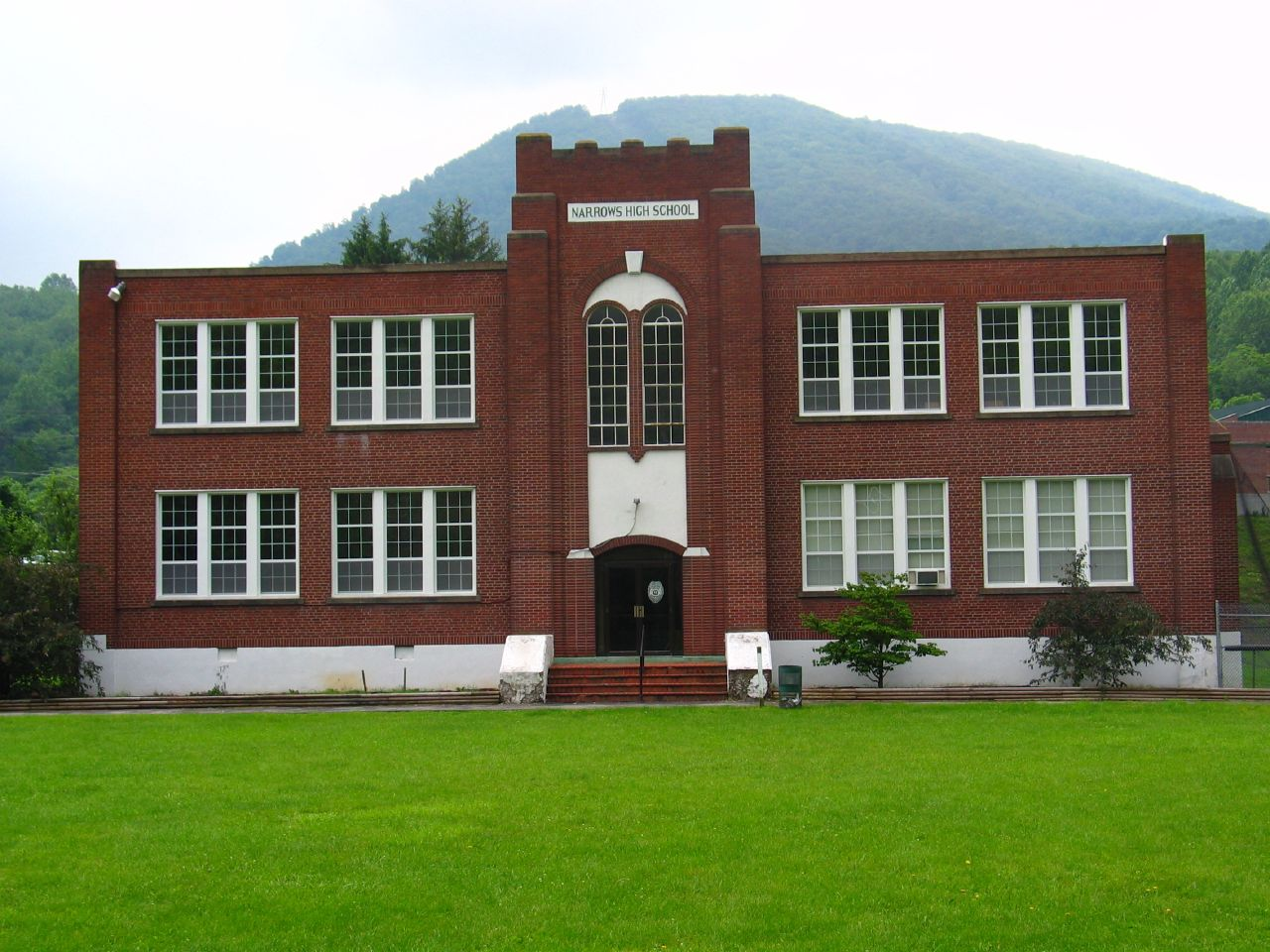
- Narrows High School (original building)

Location
- 1 Green Wave Lane; Narrows, VA 24124; United States

Information
- School type: Public high school
- School district: Giles County Public Schools
- Principal: Brian Bowles
- Grades: 8th to 12th
- Enrollment: 290 (2022-2023)
- Colors: Green; Gold
- Athletics conference: VHSL Class 1 VHSL Region C VHSL Pioneer District
- Mascot: Greenwave
- Website: School website

Narrows High School is a public high school in Narrows, Giles County, Virginia, United States that enrolls students from grades 8 through 12. As of 2022 the school has an enrollment of about 290 students.

== Awards and recognition ==
In 2013, Narrows was one of 194 high schools recognized by Working in Support of Education (w!se) with the Blue Star School certification. It is awarded based on student performance on the w!se Financial Literacy Certification Test.

== Controversy ==
In September 2011, Narrows High School was sued by the American Civil Liberties Union of Virginia (ACLU) for displaying a framed copy of the Ten Commandments. The ACLU argued that the display violated the separation of church and state. According to the Los Angeles Times, a settlement was reached that allowed the school to display a page of a history textbook with an image of the Ten Commandments with a subtitle that read: "The values found in the Bible, including the Ten Commandments and the teachings of Jesus, inspired American ideas about government and morality."

On January 2, 2013, officials with the Giles County Public Schools closed all five district campuses including Narrows High School when a website attempted to connect the community with The Dark Knight Rises and the Sandy Hook Elementary School shooting in Newtown, Connecticut. The website RevelationNow.net had posted an article titled "The next school massacre target?" on December 18, just four days after the Sandy Hook shooting.

== Notable alumni ==
- Alicia Sable '97, who plays "Tammy Stackhouse" on the Amazon series Alpha House
