= Pembroke, Virginia =

- Town
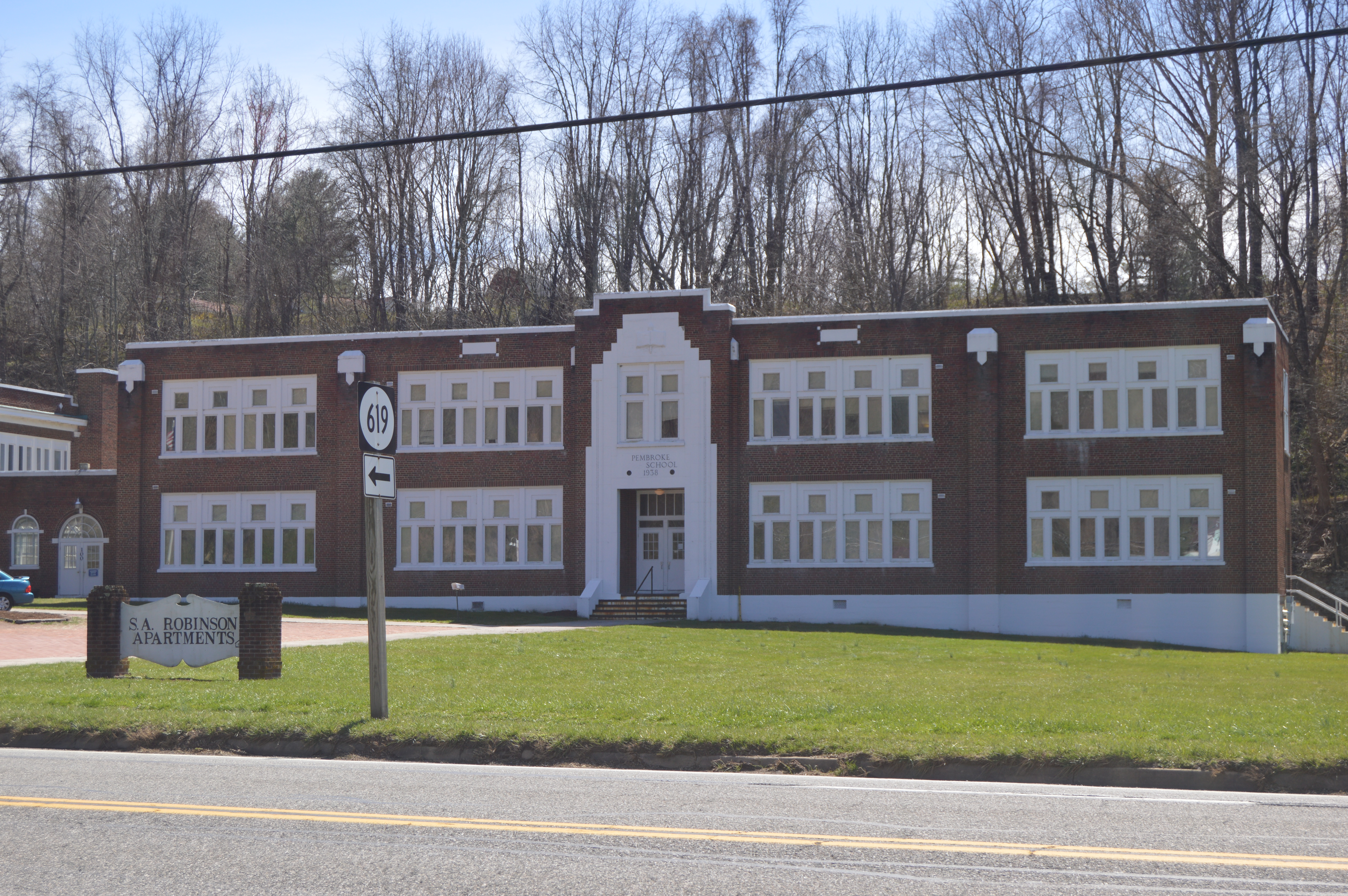
- The former Pembroke School on U.S. Route 460

- Location within Shenandoah Valley Location within Virginia Location within the United States
- Coordinates: 37°19′19″N 80°38′11″W
- Country: United States
- State: Virginia
- County: Giles

Area
  - Total: 1.08 sq mi (2.81 km^{2})
  - Land: 1.08 sq mi (2.81 km^{2})
  - Water: 0 sq mi (0.00 km^{2})
- Elevation: 1,654 ft (504 m)

Population (2020)
  - Total: 1,152
  - Estimate (2019): 1,081
  - Density: 995.5/sq mi (384.36/km^{2})
- Time zone: UTC-5 (Eastern (EST))
  - Summer (DST): UTC-4 (EDT)
- ZIP code: 24136
- Area code: 540
- FIPS code: 51-61336
- GNIS feature ID: 1497081
- Website: www.pembrokeva.org

Pembroke ( /ˈpɪmbrʊk/ PIM-bruuk) is a town in Giles County, Virginia, United States. As of the 2020 census, Pembroke had a population of 1,152. It is part of the Blacksburg-Christiansburg metropolitan area.

Pembroke is home to the Mountain Lake Lodge that was featured in Dirty Dancing.

== History ==
Pembroke, settled in the mid-1750s along the New River, was named by postmaster John Lybrook in 1845 after encountering the name in literature, possibly Shakespeare's Sonnets. It is home to Virginia's smallest library, housed in a historic frame building that once served as a stagecoach stop and post office.

== Geography ==
Pembroke is located at 37°19′19″N 80°38′11″W (37.321902, -80.636403).

According to the United States Census Bureau, the town has a total area of 1.1 square miles (2.9 km^{2}), all land.

== Demographics ==
Historical population
Census	Pop.	Note	%±
1950	1,010		—
1960	1,038		2.8%
1970	1,095		5.5%
1980	1,302		18.9%
1990	1,064		−18.3%
2000	1,134		6.6%
2010	1,128		−0.5%
2020	1,152		2.1%
U.S. Decennial Census

As of the census of 2000, there were 1,134 people, 491 households, and 317 families living in the town. The population density was 1,027.6 people per square mile (398.0/km^{2}). There were 520 housing units at an average density of 471.2 per square mile (182.5/km^{2}). The racial makeup of the town was 92.59% White, 6.79% African American, 0.09% Native American, 0.26% Asian, 0.09% from other races, and 0.18% from two or more races. Hispanic or Latino of any race were 0.35% of the population.

There were 491 households, out of which 27.1% had children under the age of 18 living with them, 49.1% were married couples living together, 11.4% had a female householder with no husband present, and 35.4% were non-families. 31.6% of all households were made up of individuals, and 15.9% had someone living alone who was 65 years of age or older. The average household size was 2.31 and the average family size was 2.89.

In the town, the population was spread out, with 22.2% under the age of 18, 6.0% from 18 to 24, 31.2% from 25 to 44, 23.6% from 45 to 64, and 16.9% who were 65 years of age or older. The median age was 38 years. For every 100 females there were 91.9 males. For every 100 females age 18 and over, there were 88.5 males.

The median income for a household in the town was $34,444, and the median income for a family was $42,632. Males had a median income of $27,419 versus $22,240 for females. The per capita income for the town was $16,643. About 5.3% of families and 6.5% of the population were below the poverty line, including 3.1% of those under age 18 and 11.1% of those age 65 or over.

== Climate ==
The climate in this area features moderate differences between highs and lows, and there is adequate rainfall year-round. According to the Köppen Climate Classification system, Pembroke has a marine west coast climate, abbreviated "Cfb" on climate maps.
