= Eggleston, Virginia =

Unincorporated community in Virginia, United States

- Census-designated place
- Location within Shenandoah Valley Location within Virginia Location within the United States
- Coordinates: 37°17′14″N 80°37′21″W
- Country: United States
- State: Virginia
- County: Giles

Area
  - Total: 0.90 sq mi (2.33 km^{2})
  - Land: 0.83 sq mi (2.14 km^{2})
  - Water: 0.073 sq mi (0.19 km^{2})
- Elevation: 1,821 ft (555 m)

Population (2020)
  - Total: 143
  - Density: 173/sq mi (66.8/km^{2})
- Time zone: UTC-5 (Eastern (EST))
  - Summer (DST): UTC-4 (EDT)
- ZIP code: 24086
- Area code: 540
- GNIS feature ID: 1494216

Eggleston is an unincorporated community and census-designated place in Giles County, Virginia, United States. Eggleston is located along the New River, 2.5 miles (4.0 km) south-southeast of Pembroke. It was first listed as a CDP in the 2020 census with a population of 143.

Eggleston has a post office with ZIP code 24086.

It lies at an elevation of 1,821 feet.

== Demographics ==
Eggleston first appeared as a census designated place in the 2020 U.S. census.
