= Giles County, Virginia =

County in Virginia, United States

- County
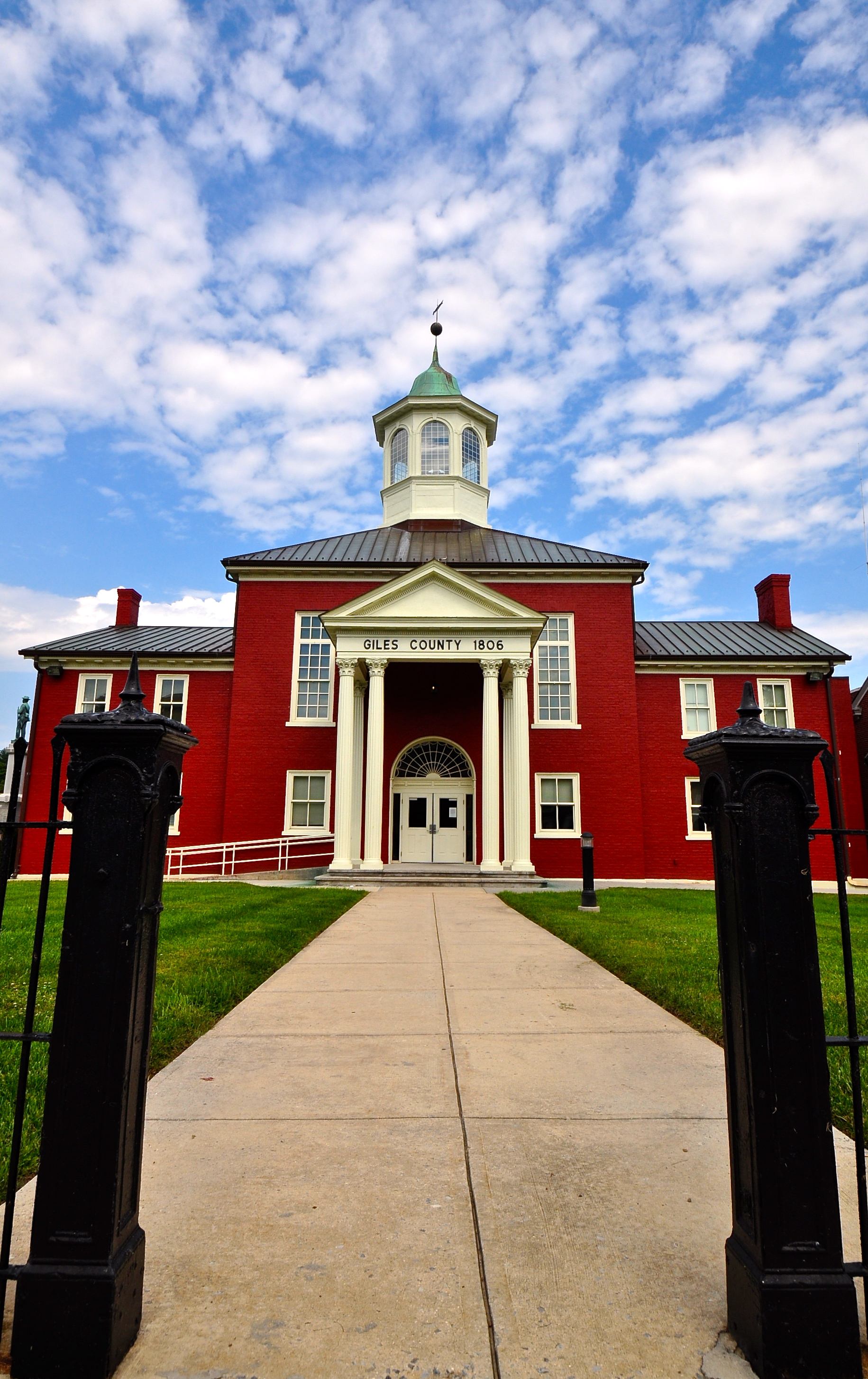
- Giles County Courthouse

- Seal

- Location within the U.S. state of Virginia
- Coordinates: 37°19′N 80°42′W
- Country: United States
- State: Virginia
- Founded: 1806
- Named for: William Branch Giles
- Seat: Pearisburg
- Largest town: Pearisburg

Area
  - Total: 360 sq mi (930 km^{2})
  - Land: 356 sq mi (920 km^{2})
  - Water: 4.6 sq mi (12 km^{2}) 1.3%

Population (2020)
  - Total: 16,787
  - Estimate (2025): 16,564 ▼
  - Density: 47.2/sq mi (18.2/km^{2})
- Time zone: UTC−5 (Eastern)
  - Summer (DST): UTC−4 (EDT)
- Congressional district: 9th
- Website: www.virginiasmtnplayground.com

Giles County is a county located in the U.S. state of Virginia on the West Virginia state line. As of the 2020 census, the population was 16,787. Its county seat is Pearisburg.

Giles County is included in the Blacksburg–Christiansburg metropolitan area.

Giles County is the location of Mountain Lake, one of only two natural fresh water lakes in Virginia. The lake drains into Little Stony Creek, which passes over a waterfall known as The Cascades before reaching the New River.

== History ==
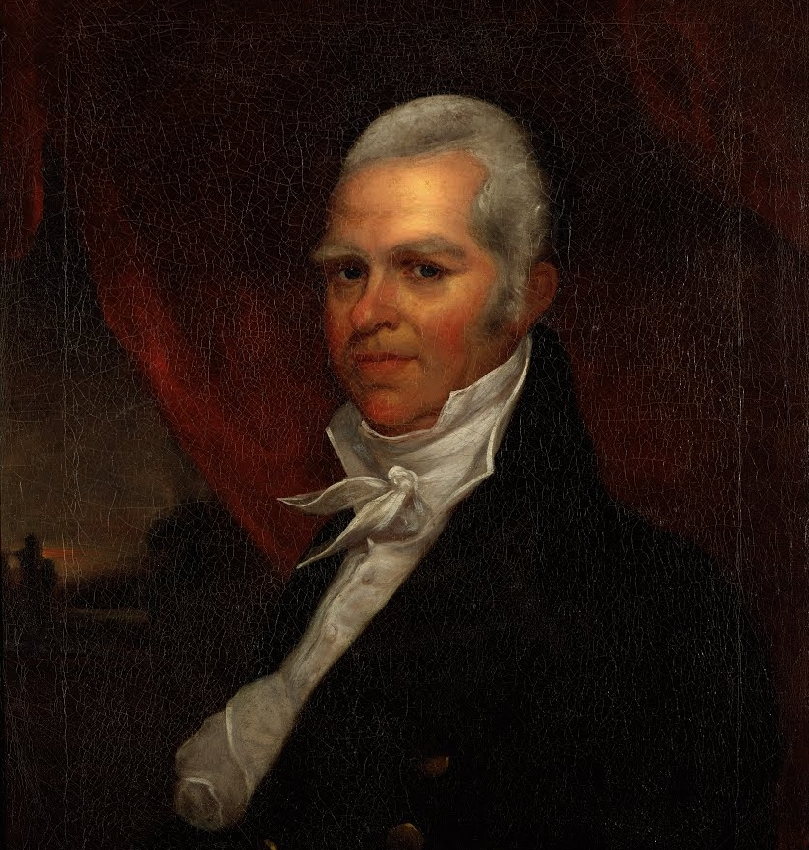
William Branch Giles, for whom the county was named

Giles County was established in 1806 from Montgomery, Monroe, Wythe, and Tazewell counties. The county is named for William Branch Giles who was born in Amelia County in 1762. Giles became a lawyer and from there was elected to the United States House of Representatives where he served from 1790 to 1815. He also served in the Virginia General Assembly from 1816 to 1822. In 1827, he was elected Governor. In all, he served his nation and state around a total of forty years.

One of the strongest earthquakes in Virginia and the East Coast of the country had an epicenter in Giles County. The magnitude 5.9 earthquake struck on May 31, 1897. It caused damage to chimneys in the epicenter area and was felt hundreds of miles away. In Giles County, the quake also derailed a train.

== Geography ==
According to the U.S. Census Bureau, the county has a total area of 360 square miles (930 km^{2}), of which 356 square miles (920 km^{2}) is land and 4.6 square miles (12 km^{2}) (1.3%) is water. Giles County is one of the 423 counties served by the Appalachian Regional Commission, and it is identified as part of "Greater Appalachia" by Colin Woodard in his book American Nations: A History of the Eleven Rival Regional Cultures of North America.

It is the site of two of the highest mountain peaks of Virginia.

=== Adjacent counties ===
- Summers County, West Virginia – north
- Monroe County, West Virginia – north
- Craig County – east
- Montgomery County – southeast
- Pulaski County – south
- Bland County – west
- Mercer County, West Virginia – northwest

=== National protected area ===
- Jefferson National Forest (part)

=== Major highways ===
- US 219 (Federal Street)
- US 460 (Virginia Avenue)
- SR 42 (Virginia State Route 42) (disconnected; one piece comes in from Bland County to VA 100 while the other goes from U.S. 460 into Craig County)
- SR 61 (Wolf Creek Highway outside of Narrows)
- SR 100 (Virginia State Route 100)

=== Railroads ===
- Norfolk Southern (Virginia Division)

== Demographics ==
Historical population
Census	Pop.	Note	%±
1810	3,745		—
1820	4,521		20.7%
1830	5,274		16.7%
1840	5,307		0.6%
1850	6,570		23.8%
1860	6,883		4.8%
1870	5,875		−14.6%
1880	8,794		49.7%
1890	9,090		3.4%
1900	10,793		18.7%
1910	11,623		7.7%
1920	11,901		2.4%
1930	12,804		7.6%
1940	14,635		14.3%
1950	18,956		29.5%
1960	17,219		−9.2%
1970	16,741		−2.8%
1980	17,810		6.4%
1990	16,366		−8.1%
2000	16,657		1.8%
2010	17,286		3.8%
2020	16,787		−2.9%
2025 (est.)	16,564	▼	−1.3%
U.S. Decennial Census; 1790–1960 1900–1990; 1990–2000 2010 2020

=== Racial and ethnic composition ===
Giles County, Virginia – Racial and ethnic composition Note: the US Census treats Hispanic/Latino as an ethnic category. This table excludes Latinos from the racial categories and assigns them to a separate category. Hispanics/Latinos may be of any race.
Race / Ethnicity (NH = Non-Hispanic)	Pop 1980	Pop 1990	Pop 2000	Pop 2010	Pop 2020	% 1980	% 1990	% 2000	% 2010	% 2020
White alone (NH)	17,306	15,994	16,141	16,580	15,673	97.17%	97.73%	96.90%	95.92%	93.36%
Black or African American alone (NH)	354	283	263	259	238	1.99%	1.73%	1.58%	1.50%	1.42%
Native American or Alaska Native alone (NH)	5	8	20	19	28	0.03%	0.05%	0.12%	0.11%	0.17%
Asian alone (NH)	40	24	31	54	69	0.22%	0.15%	0.19%	0.31%	0.41%
Native Hawaiian or Pacific Islander alone (NH)	x	x	0	0	0	x	x	0.00%	0.00%	0.00%
Other race alone (NH)	8	0	14	7	19	0.04%	0.00%	0.08%	0.04%	0.11%
Mixed race or Multiracial (NH)	x	x	83	158	516	x	x	0.50%	0.91%	3.07%
Hispanic or Latino (any race)	97	57	105	209	244	0.54%	0.35%	0.63%	1.21%	1.45%
Total	17,810	16,366	16,657	17,286	16,787	100.00%	100.00%	100.00%	100.00%	100.00%

=== 2020 census ===
As of the 2020 census, the county had a population of 16,787. The median age was 46.0 years. 20.0% of residents were under the age of 18 and 22.2% of residents were 65 years of age or older. For every 100 females there were 96.5 males, and for every 100 females age 18 and over there were 95.1 males age 18 and over.

The racial makeup of the county was 94.0% White, 1.5% Black or African American, 0.2% American Indian and Alaska Native, 0.4% Asian, 0.0% Native Hawaiian and Pacific Islander, 0.4% from some other race, and 3.6% from two or more races. Hispanic or Latino residents of any race comprised 1.5% of the population.

0.0% of residents lived in urban areas, while 100.0% lived in rural areas.

There were 7,107 households in the county, of which 24.9% had children under the age of 18 living with them and 25.3% had a female householder with no spouse or partner present. About 29.4% of all households were made up of individuals and 14.8% had someone living alone who was 65 years of age or older.

There were 8,285 housing units, of which 14.2% were vacant. Among occupied housing units, 73.7% were owner-occupied and 26.3% were renter-occupied. The homeowner vacancy rate was 2.1% and the rental vacancy rate was 9.7%.

=== 2010 census ===
As of the census of 2010, there were 17,286 people, 7,215 households, and 4,899 families residing in the county. The population density was 48 people per square mile (19 people/km^{2}). There were 8,319 housing units at an average density of 23 units per square mile (8.9 units/km^{2}).

There were 7,215 households, out of which 29.27% had children under the age of 18 living with them, 52.46% were married couples living together, 10.49% had a female householder with no husband present, and 32.10% were non-families. 27.86% of all households were made up of individuals, and 12.56% had someone living alone who was 65 years of age or older. The average household size was 2.38 and the average family size was 2.88.

In the county, the population was spread out, with 22.70% under the age of 18, 4.89% from 20 to 24, 23.85% from 25 to 44, 29.43% from 45 to 64, and 18.03% who were 65 years of age or older. The median age was 43 years. For every 100 females, there were 96.14 males. For every 100 females age 18 and over, there were 93.55 males.

The median income for a household in the county was $45,231, and the median income for a family was $53,750. Males had a median income of $41,521 versus $36,886 for females. The per capita income for the county was $23,766. About 6.60% of families (2000 census) and 12.7% of the population were below the poverty line(2012), including 17.70% of those under age 18 (2012)and 10.50% of those age 65 or over (2000 census).

== Government ==
=== Board of Supervisors ===
- At-Large District: Paul W. "Chappy" Baker (I)
- At-Large District: Richard "Ricky" McCoy (I)
- Central District: Jeffrey Morris (I)
- Eastern District: Perry Martin (I)
- Western District: John Lawson (I)

=== Constitutional officers ===
- Clerk of the Circuit Court: Sherry E Gautier (I)
- Commissioner of the Revenue: Lisa Corell (I)
- Commonwealth's Attorney: Robert M. Lilly, Jr. (I)
- Sheriff: W. Morgan Millirons (I)
- Treasurer: Angela L. Higginbotham (I)

Giles is represented by Republican Travis Hackworth in the Virginia Senate, Republican Jason Ballard in the Virginia House of Delegates, and Republican H. Morgan Griffith in the U.S. House of Representatives.

=== Law enforcement ===
The Giles County Sheriff's Department patrols and investigates crimes in the county. It also serves process, provides security for the county court, and operates the county's E-911 service. Since the establishment of the Sheriff's Office, 1 officer has died in the line of duty, in 1954.

=== Presidential election results ===
United States presidential election results for Giles County, Virginia
Year	Republican		Democratic		Third party(ies)	
Year	No.	%	No.	%	No.	%
1912	267	21.43%	725	58.19%	254	20.39%
1916	596	41.39%	839	58.26%	5	0.35%
1920	877	44.14%	1,104	55.56%	6	0.30%
1924	852	38.21%	1,319	59.15%	59	2.65%
1928	1,313	50.38%	1,293	49.62%	0	0.00%
1932	1,016	36.26%	1,754	62.60%	32	1.14%
1936	1,047	40.33%	1,547	59.59%	2	0.08%
1940	1,024	37.32%	1,716	62.54%	4	0.15%
1944	1,203	41.34%	1,703	58.52%	4	0.14%
1948	1,448	46.48%	1,529	49.09%	138	4.43%
1952	1,935	52.94%	1,717	46.98%	3	0.08%
1956	2,270	51.84%	2,016	46.04%	93	2.12%
1960	2,030	46.91%	2,214	51.17%	83	1.92%
1964	1,952	37.78%	3,133	60.63%	82	1.59%
1968	2,722	43.36%	2,045	32.58%	1,510	24.06%
1972	3,671	64.34%	1,869	32.75%	166	2.91%
1976	2,731	40.53%	3,779	56.08%	229	3.40%
1980	2,978	42.91%	3,627	52.26%	335	4.83%
1984	4,340	58.18%	3,047	40.84%	73	0.98%
1988	3,490	52.50%	3,042	45.76%	116	1.74%
1992	3,023	39.61%	3,346	43.84%	1,263	16.55%
1996	2,566	38.15%	3,196	47.52%	964	14.33%
2000	3,574	52.40%	3,004	44.05%	242	3.55%
2004	4,320	57.62%	3,047	40.64%	131	1.75%
2008	4,462	57.24%	3,192	40.95%	141	1.81%
2012	4,660	61.66%	2,730	36.12%	168	2.22%
2016	5,910	71.97%	1,950	23.75%	352	4.29%
2020	6,876	74.93%	2,156	23.50%	144	1.57%
2024	7,102	76.67%	2,069	22.34%	92	0.99%

== Communities ==
=== Towns ===
After the dissolution of the Town of Glen Lyn in 2024, Giles County has four incorporated towns.

Town	Population in 2022
Narrows	2,046
Pearisburg	2,832
Pembroke	1,129
Rich Creek	735

=== Census-designated places ===
- Eggleston
- Ripplemead

=== Unincorporated communities ===
- Glen Lyn
- Goldbond
- Hoges Chapel
- Kimballton
- Maybrook
- Newport
- Prospectdale
- Staffordsville
- Trigg
- White Gate

== Education ==
Giles county is home to three public elementary/middle schools, two public high schools, and one technical school:

Eastern Elementary/Middle School (Pembroke)
Macy McClaugherty Elementary/Middle School (Pearisburg)
Narrows Elementary/Middle School (Narrows)
Giles High School (Pearisburg)
Narrows High School (Narrows)
Giles County Technology Center (Pearisburg)

The schools have a combined enrollment of 2425 as of mid 2014.

== In popular culture ==
- The county and its courthouse are the setting of the 2013 film Wish You Well.

== See also ==
- Giles County Sheriff's Office
- National Register of Historic Places in Giles County, Virginia
