= Pearisburg, Virginia =

- Town
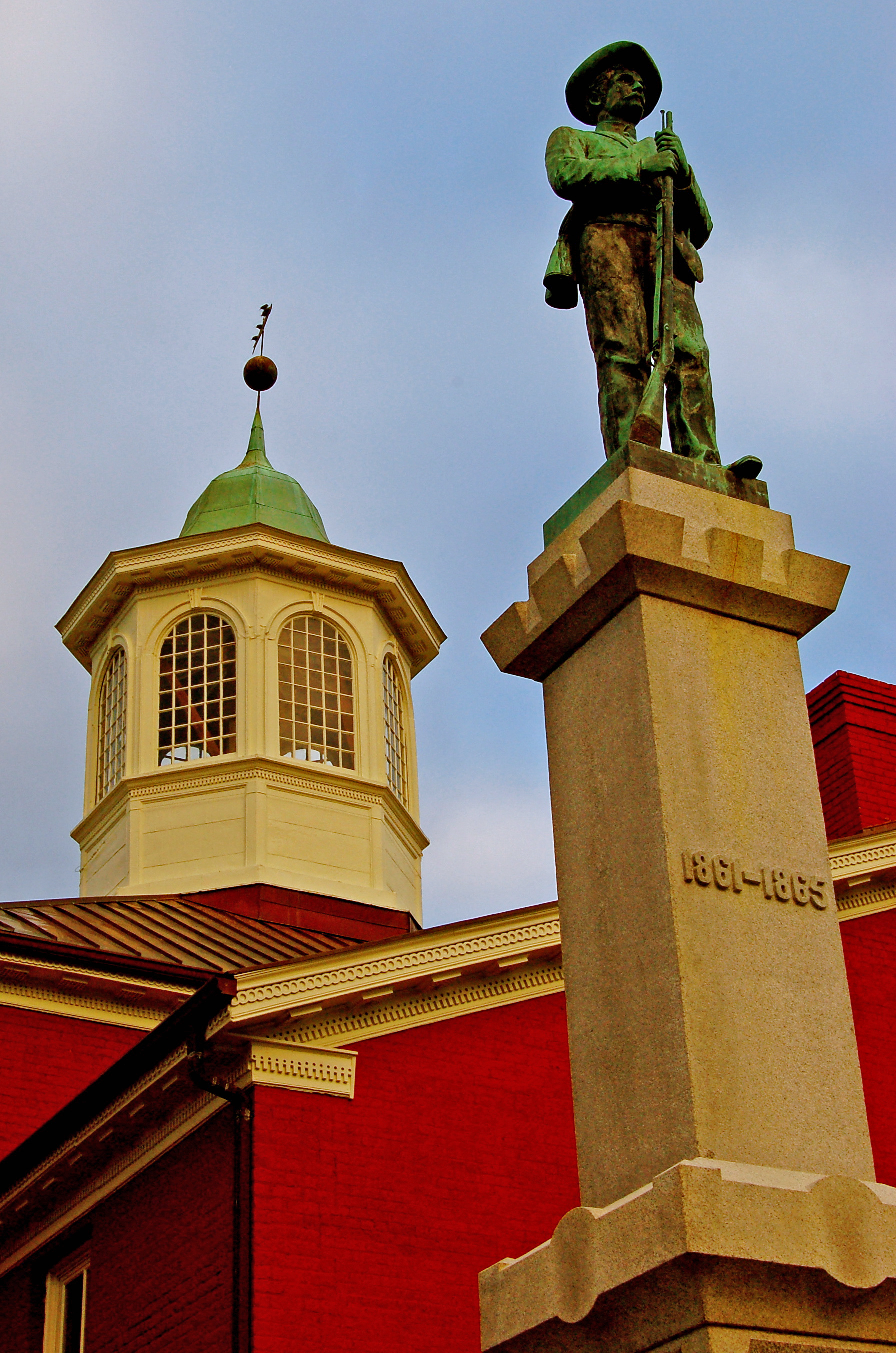
- Giles County Courthouse, Confederate Memorial and cupola in Pearisburg

- Seal

- Location within Shenandoah Valley Location within Virginia Location within the United States
- Coordinates: 37°19′45″N 80°43′57″W
- Country: United States
- State: Virginia
- County: Giles

Government
  - Mayor: Robert Dickerson

Area
  - Total: 3.20 sq mi (8.28 km^{2})
  - Land: 3.19 sq mi (8.27 km^{2})
  - Water: 0.0039 sq mi (0.01 km^{2}) 0.15%
- Elevation: 1,808 ft (551 m)

Population (2020)
  - Total: 2,909
  - Density: 911/sq mi (351.9/km^{2})
- Time zone: UTC−5 (EST)
  - Summer (DST): UTC−4 (EDT)
- ZIP code: 24134
- Area code: 540
- FIPS code: 51-61208
- GNIS feature ID: 1498527
- Website: www.pearisburg.org

Pearisburg is a town in and the county seat of Giles County, Virginia, United States. The population was 2,909 at the time of the 2020 census. Pearisburg is part of the Blacksburg-Christiansburg metropolitan area.

== History ==
Pearisburg was founded in 1808 when Giles County was established. It was named after George Pearis, a local landowner who donated a 50-acre (20 ha) tract to be used for a town that would grow up around the county courthouse. Pearis had operated a ferry on the New River at a settlement called "Bluff City", which is incorporated into the present boundaries of the town of Pearisburg.

== Geography ==
Pearisburg is located slightly west of the center of Giles County at 37°19′45″N 80°43′57″W (37.329184, −80.732490). It is south of the New River at the foot of Pearis Mountain, which rises to 3,700 feet (1,100 m) to the southwest of town. The Appalachian Trail descends Pearis Mountain and passes through the western limit of the town before crossing the New River.

U.S. Route 460 passes through the north side of town, leading southeast 24 miles (39 km) to Blacksburg and west 27 miles (43 km) to Princeton, West Virginia. Virginia Route 100 passes through the center of Pearisburg, leading south 20 miles (32 km) to Dublin near Interstate 81.

According to the United States Census Bureau, Pearisburg has a total area of 3.2 square miles (8.2 km^{2}), of which 0.004 square miles (0.01 km^{2}), or 0.15%, are water.

== Demographics ==
Historical population
Census	Pop.	Note	%±
1880	285		—
1890	341		19.6%
1900	464		36.1%
1910	470		1.3%
1920	537		14.3%
1930	668		24.4%
1940	987		47.8%
1950	2,005		103.1%
1960	2,268		13.1%
1970	2,169		−4.4%
1980	2,128		−1.9%
1990	2,064		−3.0%
2000	2,729		32.2%
2010	2,786		2.1%
2020	2,909		4.4%
U.S. Decennial Census

As of the census of 2000, there were 2,729 people, 1,219 households, and 789 families residing in the town. The population density was 890.7 people per square mile (344.3/km^{2}). There were 1,279 housing units at an average density of 417.5 per square mile (161.4/km^{2}). The racial makeup of the town was 96.12% White, 2.02% African American, 0.07% Native American, 0.51% Asian, 0.44% from other races, and 0.84% from two or more races. Hispanic or Latino of any race were 0.70% of the population.

There were 1,219 households, out of which 27.3% had children under the age of 18 living with them, 49.0% were married couples living together, 11.5% had a female householder with no husband present, and 35.2% were non-families. 31.9% of all households were made up of individuals, and 17.1% had someone living alone who was 65 years of age or older. The average household size was 2.23 and the average family size was 2.77.

In the town, the population was spread out, with 22.1% under the age of 18, 6.8% from 18 to 24, 26.7% from 25 to 44, 24.7% from 45 to 64, and 19.8% who were 65 years of age or older. The median age was 41 years. For every 100 females, there were 88.6 males. For every 100 females aged 18 and over, there were 81.6 males.

The median income for a household in the town was $33,720, and the median income for a family was $39,938. Males had a median income of $30,347 versus $23,482 for females. The per capita income for the town was $17,412. About 11.5% of families and 15.0% of the population were below the poverty line, including 19.1% of those under age 18 and 13.0% of those age 65 or over.

== Climate ==
The climate in this area features moderate differences between highs and lows, and there is adequate rainfall year-round. According to the Köppen Climate Classification system, Pearisburg has a marine west coast climate, abbreviated "Cfb" on climate maps.

Climate data for Pearisburg, Virginia (1991–2020 normals, extremes 1970–present)
Month	Jan	Feb	Mar	Apr	May	Jun	Jul	Aug	Sep	Oct	Nov	Dec	Year
Record high °F (°C)	77 (25)	80 (27)	88 (31)	90 (32)	92 (33)	97 (36)	100 (38)	100 (38)	95 (35)	95 (35)	82 (28)	75 (24)	100 (38)
Mean maximum °F (°C)	63.8 (17.7)	67.0 (19.4)	75.2 (24.0)	81.5 (27.5)	85.2 (29.6)	89.0 (31.7)	90.4 (32.4)	89.7 (32.1)	87.4 (30.8)	81.2 (27.3)	72.9 (22.7)	64.8 (18.2)	91.6 (33.1)
Mean daily maximum °F (°C)	42.5 (5.8)	46.3 (7.9)	54.6 (12.6)	65.3 (18.5)	72.6 (22.6)	79.6 (26.4)	82.8 (28.2)	81.4 (27.4)	76.2 (24.6)	66.3 (19.1)	55.4 (13.0)	45.9 (7.7)	64.1 (17.8)
Daily mean °F (°C)	32.7 (0.4)	35.6 (2.0)	42.7 (5.9)	52.2 (11.2)	60.4 (15.8)	68.0 (20.0)	71.7 (22.1)	70.4 (21.3)	64.6 (18.1)	53.8 (12.1)	43.2 (6.2)	35.9 (2.2)	52.6 (11.4)
Mean daily minimum °F (°C)	22.9 (−5.1)	25.0 (−3.9)	30.7 (−0.7)	39.1 (3.9)	48.2 (9.0)	56.5 (13.6)	60.6 (15.9)	59.5 (15.3)	53.1 (11.7)	41.3 (5.2)	31.1 (−0.5)	25.9 (−3.4)	41.2 (5.1)
Mean minimum °F (°C)	4.6 (−15.2)	8.4 (−13.1)	15.1 (−9.4)	25.6 (−3.6)	33.6 (0.9)	44.3 (6.8)	51.6 (10.9)	50.2 (10.1)	39.5 (4.2)	26.4 (−3.1)	17.7 (−7.9)	9.8 (−12.3)	1.7 (−16.8)
Record low °F (°C)	−18 (−28)	−13 (−25)	−5 (−21)	15 (−9)	26 (−3)	34 (1)	40 (4)	37 (3)	29 (−2)	16 (−9)	8 (−13)	−12 (−24)	−18 (−28)
Average precipitation inches (mm)	3.14 (80)	2.63 (67)	3.65 (93)	3.70 (94)	4.69 (119)	4.00 (102)	4.70 (119)	3.46 (88)	3.35 (85)	2.89 (73)	2.70 (69)	3.26 (83)	42.17 (1,071)
Average snowfall inches (cm)	6.5 (17)	6.6 (17)	4.0 (10)	0.7 (1.8)	0.0 (0.0)	0.0 (0.0)	0.0 (0.0)	0.0 (0.0)	0.0 (0.0)	0.0 (0.0)	0.3 (0.76)	4.6 (12)	22.7 (58)
Average extreme snow depth inches (cm)	4.2 (11)	4.6 (12)	2.8 (7.1)	0.6 (1.5)	0.0 (0.0)	0.0 (0.0)	0.0 (0.0)	0.0 (0.0)	0.0 (0.0)	0.0 (0.0)	0.1 (0.25)	2.8 (7.1)	8.2 (21)
Average precipitation days (≥ 0.01 in)	10.7	9.4	11.6	12.1	13.9	12.5	13.1	12.2	9.5	8.3	8.8	10.7	132.8
Average snowy days (≥ 0.1 in)	3.6	3.3	2.2	0.5	0.0	0.0	0.0	0.0	0.0	0.0	0.5	2.6	12.7
Source: NOAA

== Notable people ==
- Jason Ballard, member of the Virginia House of Delegates
- Walter C. Caudill, former member of the Virginia House of Delegates and Senate of Virginia
- James M. French, member of the Virginia Senate
- Sally Miller Gearhart, author and political activist
- David Emmons Johnston, congressman
- Rick Kingrea, former NFL linebacker
- Burgess Macneal, engineer and inventor
- William McComas, congressman
- Marty Smith, sports journalist
- Randall Lee Smith, convicted murderer
- Jefferson Stafford, member of the Virginia House of Delegates
- James F. Strother, congressman
- Creed Taylor, jazz record producer
- John W. Williams, clerk of the Virginia House of Delegates
- Joseph R. Yost, former member of the Virginia House of Delegates
