= Great Dismal Swamp maroons =

Escaped slaves living in American swamplands

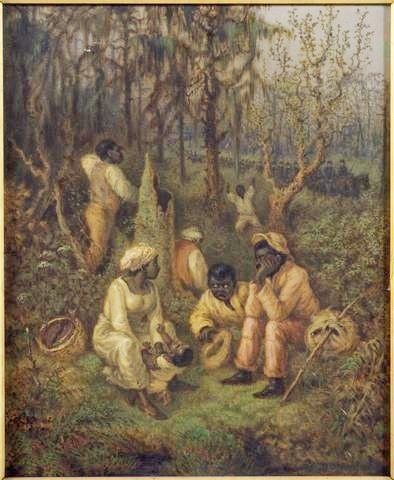
- Fugitive Slaves in the Dismal Swamp, Virginia, by David Edward Cronin, 1888.

Regions with significant populations
- Great Dismal Swamp

Languages
- English, English-based pidgin and or English-based creole

Religion
- Christianity

Related ethnic groups
- African-Americans, maroons, creoles

The Great Dismal Swamp maroons were people who inhabited the swamplands of the Great Dismal Swamp in Virginia and North Carolina after escaping enslavement. Although conditions were harsh, research suggests that thousands lived there between about 1660 and the 1860s. Harriet Beecher Stowe told the maroon people's story in her 1856 novel Dred: A Tale of the Great Dismal Swamp. The most significant research on the settlements began in 2002 with a project by Dan Sayers of American University.

== History ==
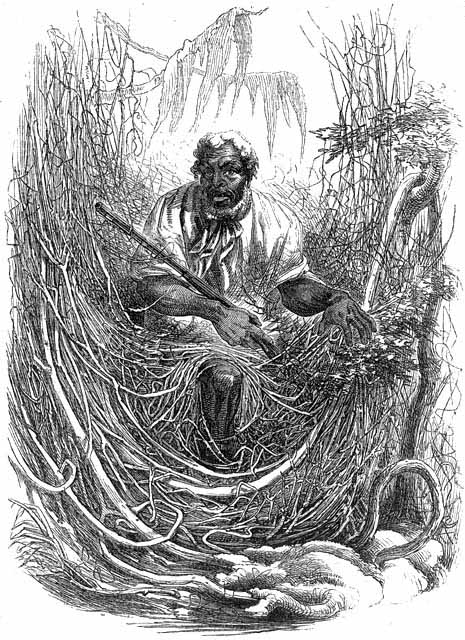
Osman, a maroon in Great Dismal Swamp. Image by David Hunter Strother in Harper's New Monthly Magazine, 1856.

The first Africans brought to the English colony of Virginia arrived in 1619 on the White Lion, an English privateer operating under a letter of marque from the Dutch Republic. These Africans, numbering roughly 20-strong, had been seized from the Portuguese slave ship São João Bautista by the crew of White Lion as the slaver was transporting them from Portuguese Angola to the Americas. The Africans were legally deemed to be indentured servants, since slave codes were not passed in Virginia until 1661. As indentured servants, they were automatically entitled to freedom after the passage of a certain period of time, and were also allowed to purchase freedom as well. Other indentured servants gained freedom by converting to Christianity, since the English colonists of Virginia were opposed to the enslavement of Christians. Slave labor was used in many efforts to drain and log the Great Dismal Swamp during the 18th and 19th centuries. People who escaped slavery by running away to the countryside came to be known as maroons.

Maroonage, self-liberated Africans in isolated or hidden settlements, existed in all the Southern states, and swamp-based maroon communities existed in the Deep South, in Alabama, Florida, Georgia, Louisiana, and South Carolina. Maroonage in the Upper South was largely limited to Virginia and the Great Dismal Swamp.

The origin of the word maroon is uncertain, with competing theories linking it to Spanish, Arawak or Taino root words. In all likelihood, the words maroon and Seminole share the same etymology in the Spanish word cimarrón, meaning "wild" or "untamed". This word usually referred to self-liberated Africans who escaped enslavement and is ultimately derived from the word for "thicket" in Old Spanish.

At the beginning of the 18th century, maroons came to live in the Great Dismal Swamp. Most settled on mesic islands, the high and dry parts of the swamp. Inhabitants included people who had purchased their freedom as well as those who had escaped. Other people used the swamp as a route on the Underground Railroad as they made their way further north. Some formerly enslaved lived there in semi-free conditions, but how much independence they actually enjoyed there has been a topic of much debate. Nearby whites often left maroons alone so long as they paid a quota in logs or shingles, and businesses may have ignored the fugitive status of people who provided work in exchange for trade goods.

Herbert Aptheker stated already in 1939, in "Maroons Within the Present Limits of the United States", that likely "about two thousand Negroes, fugitives, or the descendants of fugitives" lived in the Great Dismal Swamp, trading with white people outside the swamp. Results of a study published in 2007, "The Political Economy of Exile in the Great Dismal Swamp", say that thousands of people lived in the swamp between 1630 and 1865, Native Americans, maroons and enslaved laborers on the canal. A 2011 study speculated that thousands may have lived in the swamp between the 1600s and 1860. While the precise number of maroons who lived in the swamp at that time is unknown, it is believed to have been one of the largest maroon colonies in the United States. It is established that "several thousand" were living there by the 19th century.

Fear of slave unrest and fugitive slaves living among maroon population caused concern amongst local whites. A militia force with dogs went into the swamp in 1823 in an attempt to remove the maroons and destroy their community, but most people escaped. In 1847, North Carolina passed a law specifically aimed at apprehending the maroons in the swamp. However, unlike other maroon communities, where local militias often captured the residents and destroyed their homes, those in the Great Dismal Swamp mostly avoided capture or the discovery of their homes.

The Chesapeake, the Nansemonds, the Recharians, and the Merrians are all Native American tribes that had connections to the swamp in the 17th century. The presence of hunting bolas indicates that the area may have served as a hunting ground as far back as 5,000 years ago. Native American communities were already in existence in the swamp when the maroons began to settle there. Because leaving the area could lead to recapture, the inhabitants often used what was readily available in the swamp, even recycling tool remnants left by Native Americans.

Since the maroons had few possessions, the few small artifacts that have been recovered have given historians little insight into their day-to-day lives. To date, excavation has yet to find any human remains. According to Sayers, a historical archaeologist at American University who has led research on the maroons of the swamp, it is possible that the acidity of the water disintegrated any bones which may have been left behind. The Tuscarora tribe resided in the swamp in the early 1700s.

Some maroons were born to those who escaped slavery and lived in the swamp for their entire lives despite the hardships of swamp life: dense underbrush, insects, venomous snakes, and bears. The difficult conditions also made the swamp an ideal hiding place, not just for the formerly enslaved but also for free Africans, enslaved Africans who worked on the swamp's canals, Native Americans, and outcast whites such as criminals. Maroons are known to have often interacted with enslaved Africans and poor whites to obtain work, food, clothes, and money. Some maroons plundered nearby farms and plantations, stole from anchored boats, and robbed travelers on nearby roads; those caught were tried for murder or theft.

In 1768, George Washington's brother, John, posted an advertisement that his man Tom had run away, likely to the swamp. Some maroon communities were set up near the Dismal Swamp Canal, built between 1793 and 1805, which is still in operation. These maroons interacted more with the outside world than those who lived in the swamp's interior, and had more contact with outsiders once canal construction began. Some took jobs on the canal, and with increased contact with the outside world, some people living in the swamp eventually moved away. During the American Civil War, the United States Colored Troops entered the swamp to liberate the people there, many of whom then joined the Union Army. Most of the maroons who remained in the swamp left after the Civil War.

The maroon communities in the Great Dismal Swamp were founded on persistence. The conditions in the swamp, whether that be the hot, humid weather, the deadly animals, or the bugs, made it a difficult place to live. These resistant communities would choose areas that were difficult to reach. This allowed for many of these communities to live in peace and to live freely. Maroon communities would also use only natural resources they found in the Great Dismal Swamp to build structures, tools, and other resources. Other more settled communities in this time period would have left behind mass-produced goods, but because of the natural resources maroon communities used, everything marking establishment has eroded away. Maroon communities succeeded in adapting to the ever changing environment and ecology of the Great Dismal Swamp.

These communities disbanded for a number of reasons. When the American Civil War began, many people living in these communities left to fight for the Union. Once the war was over and slavery was abolished, many left to find family and to move north. The further development of the Great Dismal Swamp also led to the end of these communities. Many free and enslaved African Americans worked with companies to develop the land in the swamp. The Great Dismal Swamp was drained to create fields. The swamp was also cleared and graded to build roads. By 1836, railroads were being built through the swamp as well. After this construction in the swamp, a 22.5-mile interstate highway was built around the area. With increasing traffic through the area, the Great Dismal Swamp was no longer seen as a place that was "dismal", but more attractive to the people who could afford to visit, and commercial enterprises started to move into the area. Many tourists would come to see the swamp and use the water for medicinal purposes. Many of the free and enslaved people began to leave as the swamp was taken over by commerce and tourism.

While these communities eventually disbanded, these maroon communities represented opportunities for black resistance, initiative and autonomy. Researchers have criticized the lack of acknowledgment of these communities, due to both the racial makeup of the community and because they left few artifacts for archaeologists to recover and study.

According to American University researcher Daniel Sayers: "There were hardships and deprivations, for sure ... But no overseer was going to whip them here. No one was going to work them in a cotton field from sunup to sundown, or sell their spouses and children. They were free. They had emancipated themselves."

== Location ==
The Great Dismal Swamp spans an area of southeastern Virginia and northeastern North Carolina between the James River near Norfolk, Virginia, and the Albemarle Sound near Edenton, North Carolina. The swamp is estimated to have originally been over 1 million acres (4,000 km^{2}), but human encroachment has destroyed up to 90% of the swampland.

Today, the Great Dismal Swamp National Wildlife Refuge is just over 112 thousand acres (450 km^{2}). The swamp also includes Lake Drummond, which is about 3,100 acres (13 square km). The Great Dismal Swamp is now preserved and protected from further destruction by the Dismal Swamp Act of 1974 which included Great Dismal Swamp National Wildlife Refuge, and North Carolina's declaration of the Dismal Swamp State Park.

== References in literature and art ==
In 1842, Henry Wadsworth Longfellow wrote the poem "The Slave in Dismal Swamp" for his collection Poems on Slavery. The poem uses six quintain stanzas to tell about the "hunted Negro", mentioning the use of bloodhounds and describing the conditions as being "where hardly a human foot could pass, or a human heart would dare". The poem may have inspired artist David Edward Cronin, who served as a Union officer in Virginia and witnessed the effect of slavery, to paint Fugitive Slaves in the Dismal Swamp, Virginia in 1888.

In 1856, Harriet Beecher Stowe, the author of Uncle Tom's Cabin, published her second anti-slavery novel, Dred: A Tale of the Great Dismal Swamp. The title character is a maroon of the Great Dismal Swamp who preaches against slavery and incites slaves to escape.

In 2022, Amina Luqman-Dawson published a young adult novel called Freewater, set in the Great Dismal Swamp. In 2023, the historical fiction novel won the Newbery Medal as well as the Coretta Scott King Award.

== Research ==
The Great Dismal Swamp Landscape Study began in 2002 and was led by Dan Sayers, a historical archaeologist at American University's Department of Anthropology. In 2003, he conducted the first excavation in the swamp, and in 2009, in partnership with the U.S. Fish and Wildlife Service (which manages the Great Dismal Swamp National Wildlife Refuge) and American University, initiated the annual research program titled the Great Dismal Swamp Archaeology Field School. This effort continues the work of the landscape study. It examines the impact of colonialism, slavery, and development on the swamp, especially on the self-sustaining maroon settlements in the swamp's interior. It also studies native lifestyles before European contact. Prior to Sayers' efforts, no field research had been done on the Great Dismal Swamp maroons. Even today, the swamp is impenetrable in places; a research group gave up in 2003 because it lost its way so many times. Sites deep in the swamp's interior are still so remote that a guide is needed to find them. The National Endowment for the Humanities gave the "We The People Award" of $200,000 to the project in 2010.

In fall 2011, a permanent exhibit was opened by the National Park Service to commemorate those who lived in the swamp during pre-Civil War times. Sayers summarizes: "These groups are very inspirational. As details unfold, we are increasingly able to show how people have the ability, as individuals and communities, to take control of their lives, even under oppressive conditions."

== See also ==
- African-Americans in North Carolina
- African Americans in Virginia
- Atlantic Creole
- Bristol slave trade
- Coastwise slave trade
- Colonial South and the Chesapeake
- First Africans in Virginia
- Gullah
- History of slavery in Virginia
- Seasoning (colonialism)
- Slavery in the colonial history of the United States
- Tobacco colonies
