= Deep Creek, Virginia =

- Unincorporated area
- Location within the Commonwealth of Virginia Deep Creek (the United States)
- Coordinates: 36°44′33″N 76°20′33″W
- Country: United States
- State: Virginia
- Independent city: Chesapeake
- Time zone: UTC−5 (Eastern (EST))
  - Summer (DST): UTC−4 (EDT)

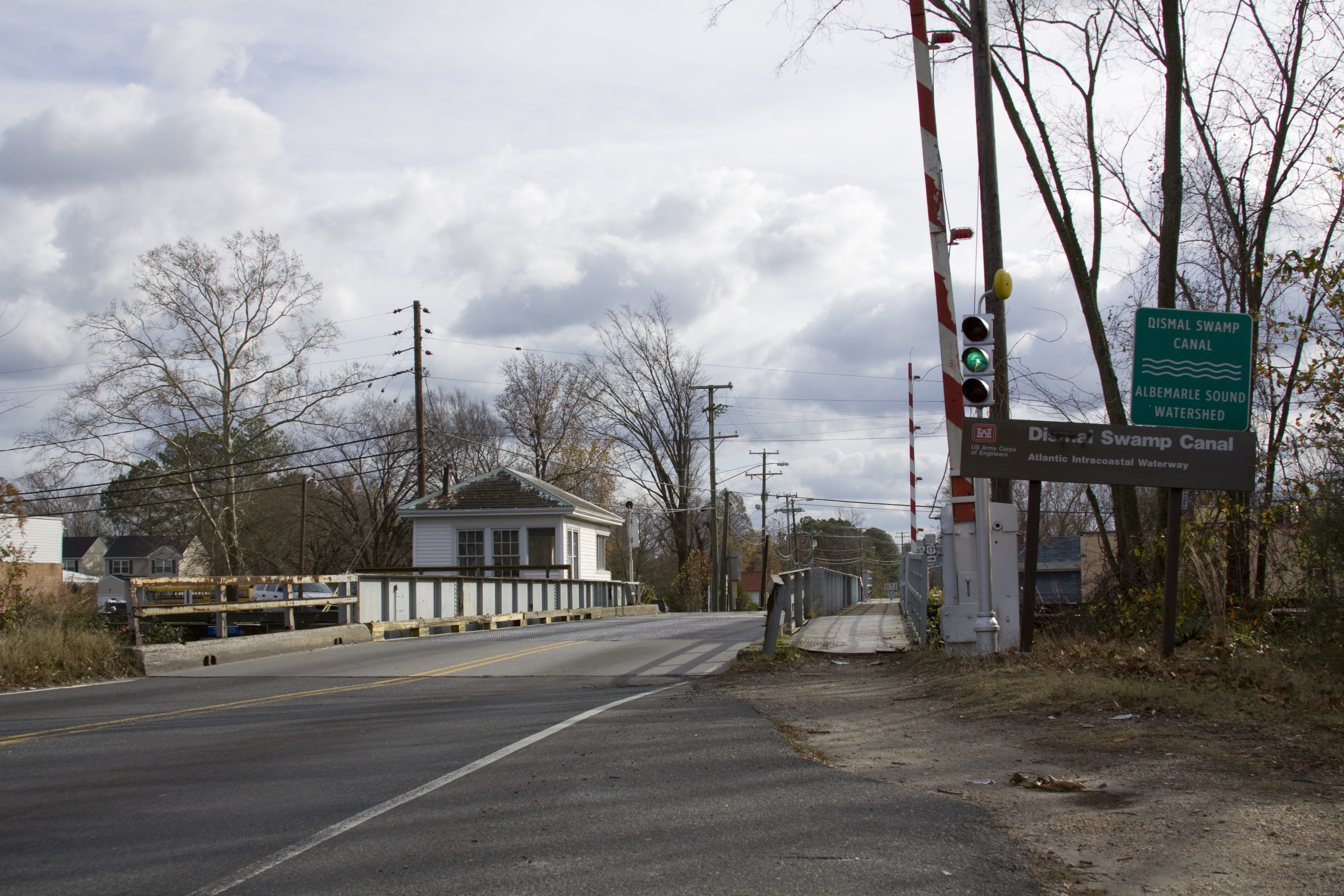
Deep Creek Bridge, a bascule-type drawbridge over the Dismal Swamp Canal

Deep Creek is a former unincorporated town of the former Norfolk County (extinct) which since 1963 has been located in the independent city of Chesapeake in the South Hampton Roads region of southeastern Virginia. Deep Creek is located on the original route of U.S. Highway 17 (also known as the Ocean Highway), on a section now designated as U.S. Route 17 Business, and has been largely bypassed by modern highway improvements.

== History ==
Deep Creek was a small settlement on the edge of the Great Dismal Swamp. In the 18th and 19th centuries, the unincorporated town was a busy stage-coach stop on the road between Norfolk and Elizabeth City, North Carolina. Until lumbering of the swamp was discontinued, it was the principal shipping point for the vast Dismal Swamp lumbering enterprises.

The northern portion of the Dismal Swamp Canal connects with the Southern Branch Elizabeth River at Deep Creek. Paralleling U.S. 17, the historic canal is listed in the National Register of Historic Places and has been designated a National Historic Civil Engineering Landmark. The Dismal Swamp Canal is now recognized as part of the National Underground Railroad and along with the Great Dismal Swamp, is noted as a former sanctuary for escaping slaves seeking freedom.

== Modern times ==
In modern times, Deep Creek is a suburban community which retains some of its original rural character. This combination at Deep Creek of old and new is typical of the City of Chesapeake in general, which contains both large suburban commercial and residential areas in its northern portion, and vast area of undeveloped forests and wetlands along its southern perimeter, in addition to including a substantial portion of the Great Dismal Swamp National Wildlife Refuge.

== See also ==
- Chesapeake, Virginia
- Political subdivisions of Virginia#Boroughs
