= Dismal Swamp State Park =

State park in North Carolina, United States

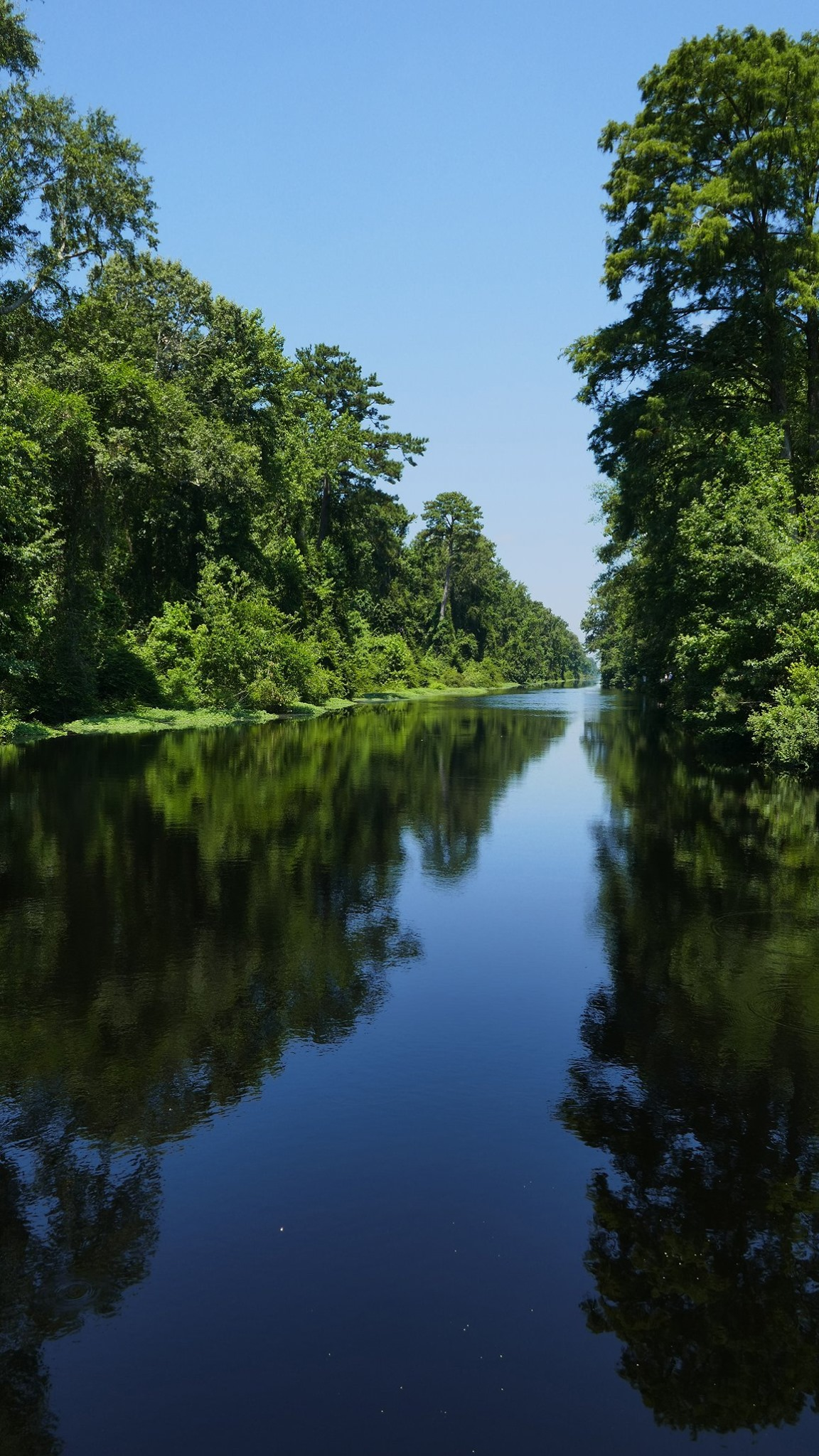
- Dismal Swamp Canal in Dismal Swamp State Park

- Location within North Carolina Location within the United States
- Interactive map of Dismal Swamp State Park
- Location: Camden County, North Carolina, United States
- Coordinates: 36°30′21″N 76°21′18″W
- Area: 14,432 acres (5,840 ha)
- Elevation: 16 ft (4.9 m)
- Established: 1974
- Administrator: North Carolina Division of Parks and Recreation
- Website: Official website

Dismal Swamp State Park is a North Carolina state park in Camden County, North Carolina, in the United States. The park was created as a state natural area in 1974 with the help of The Nature Conservancy, and on July 28, 2007, the North Carolina General Assembly re-designated it as a state park. It opened to the public in 2008. This marked the first time that public access to Great Dismal Swamp was made possible in North Carolina. The park covers 14,432 acres (58.40 km^{2}) of protected land on the North Carolina/Virginia border. Park offices are 3 miles (4.8 km) south of the border on U.S. Route 17 near South Mills. Features of the park include the canal which is used regularly by boaters using the Intracoastal Waterway and several miles of hiking and biking trails.

== History ==
By 1650, few American Indians remained in the Great Dismal Swamp area, and European settlers showed little interest in the swamp. In 1665, William Drummond, future governor of North Carolina, was the first European to explore the lake which now bears his name. William Byrd II led a surveying party into the swamp to draw a dividing line between Virginia and North Carolina in 1728. George Washington visited the swamp and called it a "glorious paradise". He then formed the Dismal Swamp Land Company in 1763, which proceeded to drain and harvest timber from part of the area. A five-mile (8 km) ditch on the west side of the current refuge still bears his name. In 1805, the Dismal Swamp Canal began serving as a commercial highway for timber coming out of the swamp.

Before and during the American Civil War, the Great Dismal Swamp was a hideout for runaway slaves from the surrounding area. Recent research showed that thousands of Great Dismal Swamp maroons lived in the swamp between the 1600s and 1865. Harriet Beecher Stowe's Dred: A Tale of the Great Dismal Swamp is based on them.

While all efforts to drain the swamp failed, logging of the swamp proved to be a successful commercial activity. Logging operations continued as late as 1976. The entire swamp has been logged at least once, and many areas have been burned by periodic wildfires. Agricultural, commercial, and residential development destroyed much of the swamp, so that the remaining portion within and around the refuge represents less than half of the original size of the swamp.

Before the refuge was established, over 140 miles (230 km) of roads were constructed to provide access to the timber. These roads disrupted the swamp's natural hydrology, as the ditches which were dug to provide soil for the road beds drained water from the swamp. The roads also blocked the flow of water across the swamp's surface, flooding some areas of the swamp with stagnant water. The logging operations removed natural stands of bald cypress and Atlantic white cypress that were replaced by other forest types, particularly red maple. A drier swamp and the suppression of wildfires, which once cleared the land for seed germination, created ecological conditions that were less favorable to the survival of cypress stands. As a result, plant and animal variety decreased.

Dismal Swamp State Park opened in 2008. It is accessed via a floating bridge over the Dismal Swamp Canal. This is the only public access to the park's visitor center, other than boat launches along the canal. Hiking and biking trails have opened and additional trails are under construction.

== Ecology ==
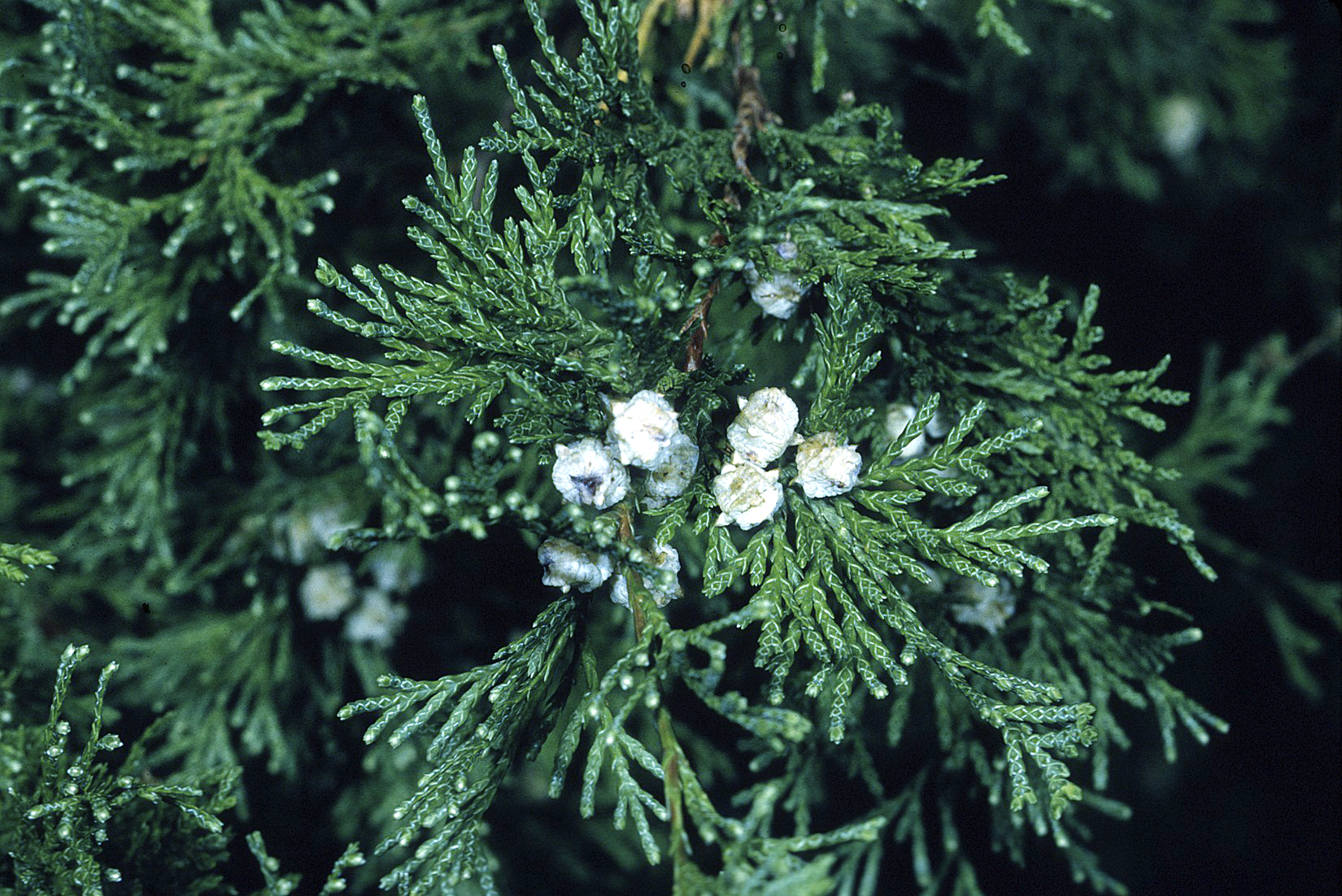
The Atlantic white cedar is an evergreen found at Dismal Swamp State Park

Dismal Swamp State Park is much drier than it was in the past. The efforts of man in the last 200 years to drain the swamp have left it drastically altered. Ditches and logging trails have cut off the normal flow of the swamp and created a series of stagnant pools and patches of dry land where continuously water covered swamps once stood. The trees of the area have changed from various types of cypress and other water loving plants to red maple and white cedar.

The white cedar thrives in the peat that is common in the area. These trees provide a habitat for several rare species. Hessel's hairstreak a species of butterfly that is dependent on the white cedar has been spotted at the park. Black-throated green warblers make their nests in the white cedars.

The drained swamp lands have converted to hardwood forests of red maple, black walnut, pawpaw and several species of oak. White-tailed deer, wild turkey, bobwhite and marsh rabbits live in the areas along the trails. Blackberry and blueberry patches line the trails. These berries attract a large number of American black bears to the area. Other common animals include the raccoon, opossum and gray fox as well as the occasional bobcat.

Butterflies are plentiful at Dismal Swamp State Park. Forty-three species have been found in the park, including large numbers of palamedes, zebra swallowtails, tiger swallowtails and Atlantic holly azures. Several varieties of warbler and vireo are common. Woodpeckers and hawks nest here as do barred owls.

== Recreation ==
Dismal Swamp State Park is open for year-round recreation. Dismal Swamp Canal is open to canoes and kayaks. A boat ramp at the park provides access to the canal. There are 16.7 miles (26.9 km) of logging trails open to hiking and mountain biking through swamp forests. Park rangers host environmental education and interpretive events. The visitor center is accessed from a floating bridge across the canal.
