= Freewater =

2022 children's novel by Amina Luqman-Dawson

- First edition cover
- Author: Amina Luqman-Dawson
- Language: English
- Genre: Historical fiction
- Publisher: Little, Brown Books for Young Readers
- Publication date: February 1, 2022
- Publication place: United States
- Awards: 2023 Coretta Scott King Author Award; Newbery Medal
- ISBN: 978-0316056618

Freewater is a 2022 children's novel by American author Amina Luqman-Dawson, and published by Little Brown and Company. The story, about two young children who escape from slavery and find a community in the Great Dismal Swamp, won both the Coretta Scott King Award and Newbery Medal in 2023.

== Plot ==
Luqman-Dawson's book is set in the southeastern United States during its slavery era. Two children and their mother are fleeing together from a horrific life on a plantation. The children become separated from the mother during the attempt. After making their way into a swamp, they are rescued by a Black man named Suleman, an escaped slave himself. He takes them to "Freewater": a community of Maroons hidden deep in the Great Dismal Swamp. Freewater is populated entirely by people who managed to escape slavery, as well as their children. While the community of Freewater is a creation of the author, it is based on actual communities that existed in the area.

The book is written with an alternating point of view, helping to develop a large and "multidimensional cast."

== Reception ==
Luqman-Dawson's book has received generous praise. Kirkus Reviews calls the novel "An exceptional addition to the resistance stories of enslaved people," and singles out the setting's description for special praise: "...so vivid that it becomes a key aspect of the narrative." BookPage calls the story "historical fiction at its finest."

== See also ==
- Great Dismal Swamp maroons

Awards
Preceded by The Last Cuentista	Newbery Medal recipient 2023	Succeeded by The Eyes and the Impossible
