= David Cronin =

David Cronin may refer to:

- David Cronin, pilot of United Airlines Flight 811
- David Edward Cronin (1839–1925), American painter, illustrator and journalist
