= The Eyes and the Impossible =

2023 children's book by Dave Eggers

- Author: Dave Eggers
- Illustrator: Shawn Harris
- Language: English
- Publisher: McSweeney’s, Knopf
- Publication date: May 9, 2023
- Publication place: United States
- Pages: 256
- Awards: Newbery Medal (2024)
- ISBN: 978-1-5247-6420-3

The Eyes and the Impossible is a 2023 all-ages book written by Dave Eggers with illustrations by Shawn Harris. It tells the story of Johannes, a dog appointed by three elderly bison to be the "eyes" of the park in which they live. The book was praised by critics and was the recipient of the 2024 Newbery Medal.

== Plot ==
Johannes is a free dog, born in a large park near an ocean. He spends his days running through the park until he is called by the three bison, Freya, Meredith and Samuel. They task him to become their eyes, reporting every day what he has seen in the park, especially if it can disturb the 'Equilibrium.' Johannes is helped by his assistant Eyes: Yolanda, the pelican; Sonja, the squirrel; Bertrand, the seagull; and Angus, the raccoon.

One day, the Eyes report humans are erecting a new building across from the museum where the white alligator lives. In front, the animals notice mysterious rectangles with fantastical images. Johannes, hypnotized, lets himself be captured by a group of Troubled Travelers, leading his assistants to stage a rescue.

== Reception ==
The Eyes and the Impossible was received positively by critics, including starred reviews by Kirkus Reviews and Publishers Weekly. Writing for The Booklist, Emily Graham called the book "delightful" and praised the way the narration of the story was done through the dog's eyes, noting similarities to one of Eggers' short stories, "After I Was Thrown in the River and Before I Drowned". Michelle Shaw, for the School Library Journal, said the book's "unique story will enchant readers and encourage them to focus on what is most important in life."

Kirkus Reviews commented on how the narration is a "mix of poetic language, sophisticated vocabulary, philosophy, humor, hyperbole, and both short declarative and run-on sentences," and praised Shawn Harris' art found throughout the book. Publishers Weekly calls Johannes a "fully fleshed protagonist" due to the multiple perspectives he offers during the narration of the story.

== Adaptations ==
The Eyes and the Impossible has been adapted for the theater by the company Word for Word, premiering in San Francisco on February 26 2026.

Awards
Preceded by Freewater	Newbery Medal recipient 2024	Succeeded by Incumbent
