= African Americans in Virginia =

Racial group in the US state

Black Virginians
Total population
- 1,607,581

Regions with significant populations
- Virginia Beach, Newport News, and Norfolk

Languages
- Southern American English, African American English

Religion
- Historically Black Protestant

African Americans are the largest racial minority in Virginia. According to the 2010 Census, more than 1.5 million, or one in five Virginians is "Black or African American". African Americans were enslaved in the state. As of the 2020 U.S. Census, African Americans were 18.6% of the state's population and 3 of the 95 counties in Virginia are African American majority (Brunswick at 54.09%, Greensville at 58.08%, and Sussex at 53.25%).

== History ==
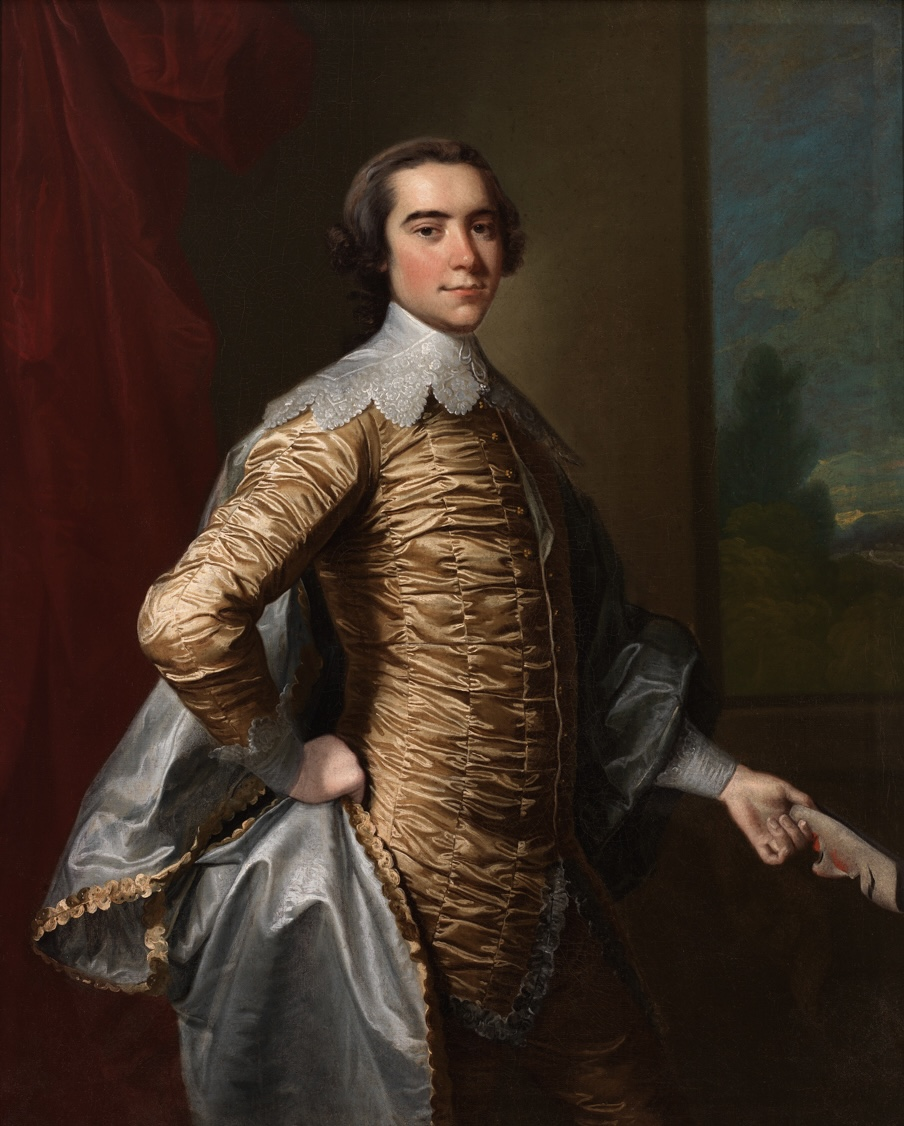
Robert Carter III owned the most African American slaves in Virginia.

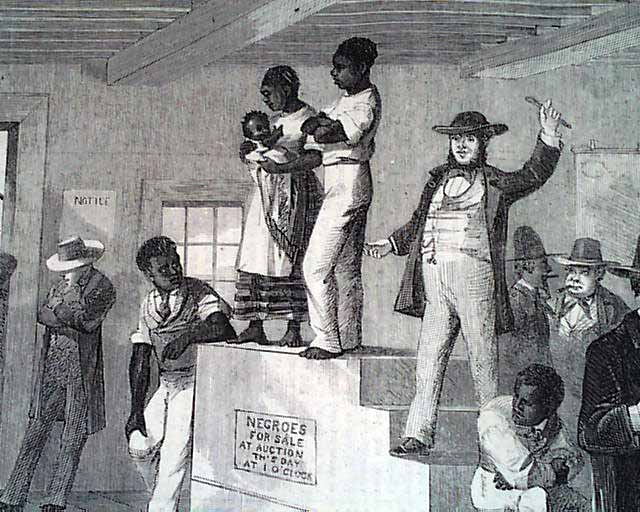
Slave auction in Virginia, 1861

Native Americans were enslaved by the Spanish before the arrival of British colonists and African American slaves.

The first twenty African slaves from Angola landed in Virginia in 1619 on a Portuguese slave ship. Lynchings, racial segregation and white supremacy were prevalent in Virginia. The first African slaves arrived in the British colony Jamestown, Virginia and were then bought by English colonists.

Virginia's initial African American slaves reached Point Comfort, located at the southern end of the Virginia peninsula, in August 1619. There, "20 and odd Negroes" or more from the English vessel White Lion were traded for provisions, and some were subsequently taken to Jamestown, where they were sold once more. A few days later, another English ship, the Treasurer, docked in the state, and its captain sold two or three more African slaves. Historians have traditionally thought that these African slaves arrived in Virginia from the Caribbean; however, Spanish documentation indicates they were captured in a Spanish-controlled region of West Central Africa. It is likely that they spoke Kimbundu, and many may have possessed at least a basic understanding of Catholic religion.

Great Dismal Swamp maroons were people who fled to swamps in Virginia to escape slavery, circa 1700s until 1860s.

White slave owners often raped and sexually abused black slaves. The rape of enslaved women was not a crime under most state laws in the 19th century. White men used black bodies for monetary gain, wealth, sexual pleasure, punishment, and for creating more slaves.

Slavery was officially abolished in Virginia in 1865 after the American Civil War.

== Education ==
The Laurel Grove Colored School and Church was a congregation founded by former enslaved African Americans in the 1880s in Franconia, Virginia. The school was active in the education of Black students from the early 1880s until 1932. The school building is now a living museum of a 1920s African American one room school; the site contains a cemetery; and the church operates as the Laurel Grove Baptist Church.

== Notable people ==
- William T. Amiger (1870–1929), college president, educator, Baptist minister
- Chris Brown (born 1989), singer
- Missy Elliott (born 1971), rapper
- Booker T. Washington (1856–1915), educator, author, orator and adviser
- Pharrell Williams (born 1973), musician, singer
- Trey Songz (born 1984, né Tremaine Aldon Neverson), singer
- Wanda Sykes (born 1964), comedian and actress
- Plaxico Burress (born 1977), football player

== See also ==
- Great Dismal Swamp maroons
- Black Southerners
- First Africans in Virginia
- History of slavery in Virginia
- Demographics of Virginia
- List of African-American newspapers in Virginia
