= Dred: A Tale of the Great Dismal Swamp =

1856 novel by Harriet Beecher Stowe

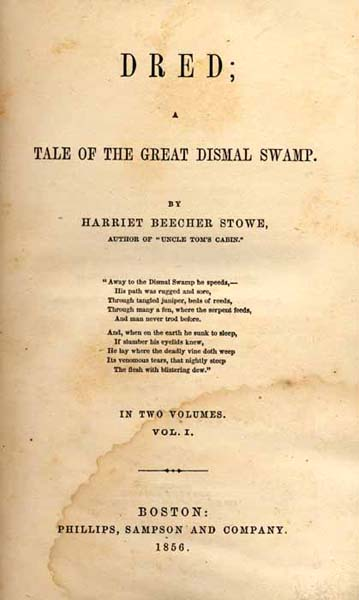
- Title page of the first edition
- Author: Harriet Beecher Stowe
- Language: English
- Genre: Novel
- Publisher: Phillips, Sampson and Company (first edition)
- Publication date: 1856
- Publication place: United States
- Media type: Print (Hardback & Paperback)
- Pages: 329 (vol. I, first edition), 370 (vol. II, first edition)

Dred: A Tale of the Great Dismal Swamp is the second popular novel from American author Harriet Beecher Stowe. It was first published in two volumes by Phillips, Sampson and Company in 1856. Although it enjoyed better initial sales than her previous, and more famous, novel Uncle Tom's Cabin, it was ultimately less popular. Dred was of a more documentary nature whereas Uncle Tom's Cabin had much stronger characters.

== Plot summary ==
Dred is the story of Nina Gordon, impetuous young heiress to a large southern plantation, whose land is rapidly becoming worthless. It is run competently by one of her slaves, Harry, who endures a murderous rivalry with Nina's brother Tom Gordon, a drunken, cruel slave-owner. Nina, a flighty young girl, maintains several suitors before finally settling down with a man named Clayton, who is socially and religiously liberal and very idealistic; he has a down-to-earth perpetual-virgin sister, Anne.

In addition to Harry (who, as well as being the administrator of Nina's estate, is secretly her and Tom's half-brother), the slave characters include the devoutly Christian Milly (actually the property of Nina's Aunt Nesbit), and Tomtit, a joker-type character. There is also a family of poor whites who have a single, devoted slave, Old Tiff.

Dred, the titular character, is one of the Great Dismal Swamp maroons, escaped slaves living in the Great Dismal Swamp, preaching angry, violent retribution for the evils of slavery and rescuing escapees from the dog of the slave-catchers.

== Major themes ==
The response to Stowe's first work greatly impacted her second anti-slavery novel. Uncle Tom's Cabin drew criticism from abolitionists and African-American authors for the passive martyrdom of Uncle Tom and endorsement of colonization as the solution to slavery. Dred, by contrast, introduces a black revolutionary character who is presented as an heir to the American revolution rather than a problem to be expatriated. Dred can thus be placed within an African-American literary tradition as well as a political revision of the sentimental novel (see David Walker's Appeal (1829) and Frederick Douglass's The Heroic Slave (1852)).

Dred himself is a composite of Denmark Vesey and Nat Turner, two real leaders of slave insurrections. Stowe included a copy of Nat Turner's famous confessions as an appendix to the novel.

One often-overlooked subplot involves Judge Clayton, who issues a proslavery opinion that absolves the man who attacked Cora's slave Milly of liability. This judge was constrained by the law from providing relief; this fits with Stowe's belief that law and judges—and religious leaders, too—could not be expected to help end slavery. It was humane sentiments rather than the rule of law that would be the lever for antislavery action.

The novel is also interesting in the historical context of runaway slave communities surviving for a long time in swamp areas. Swamps were places where runaway slaves could hide, and therefore became a taboo subject, particularly in the south.
