= Great Dismal Swamp National Wildlife Refuge =

United States National Wildlife Refuge in Virginia

- IUCN category IV (habitat/species management area)
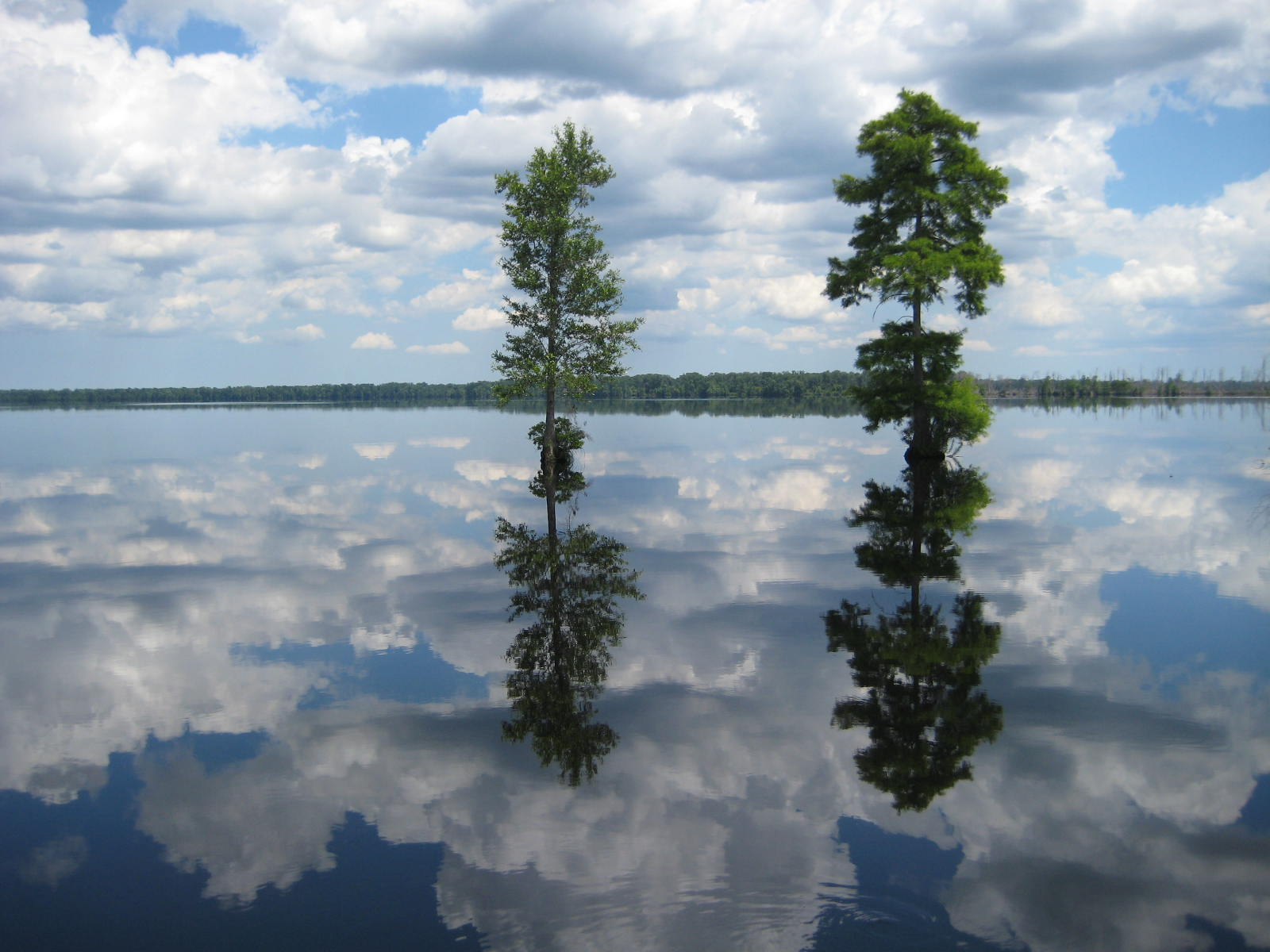
- Photograph of Lake Drummond, Great Dismal Swamp National Wildlife Refuge, Virginia

- Location within Virginia Location within the United States
- Location: Camden, Gates, Pasquotank counties, North Carolina, Chesapeake, Suffolk, Virginia, United States
- Coordinates: 36°35′00″N 76°27′00″W
- Area: 112,000 acres (450 km^{2})
- Established: 1974
- Governing body: U.S. Fish and Wildlife Service
- Website: Great Dismal Swamp National Wildlife Refuge

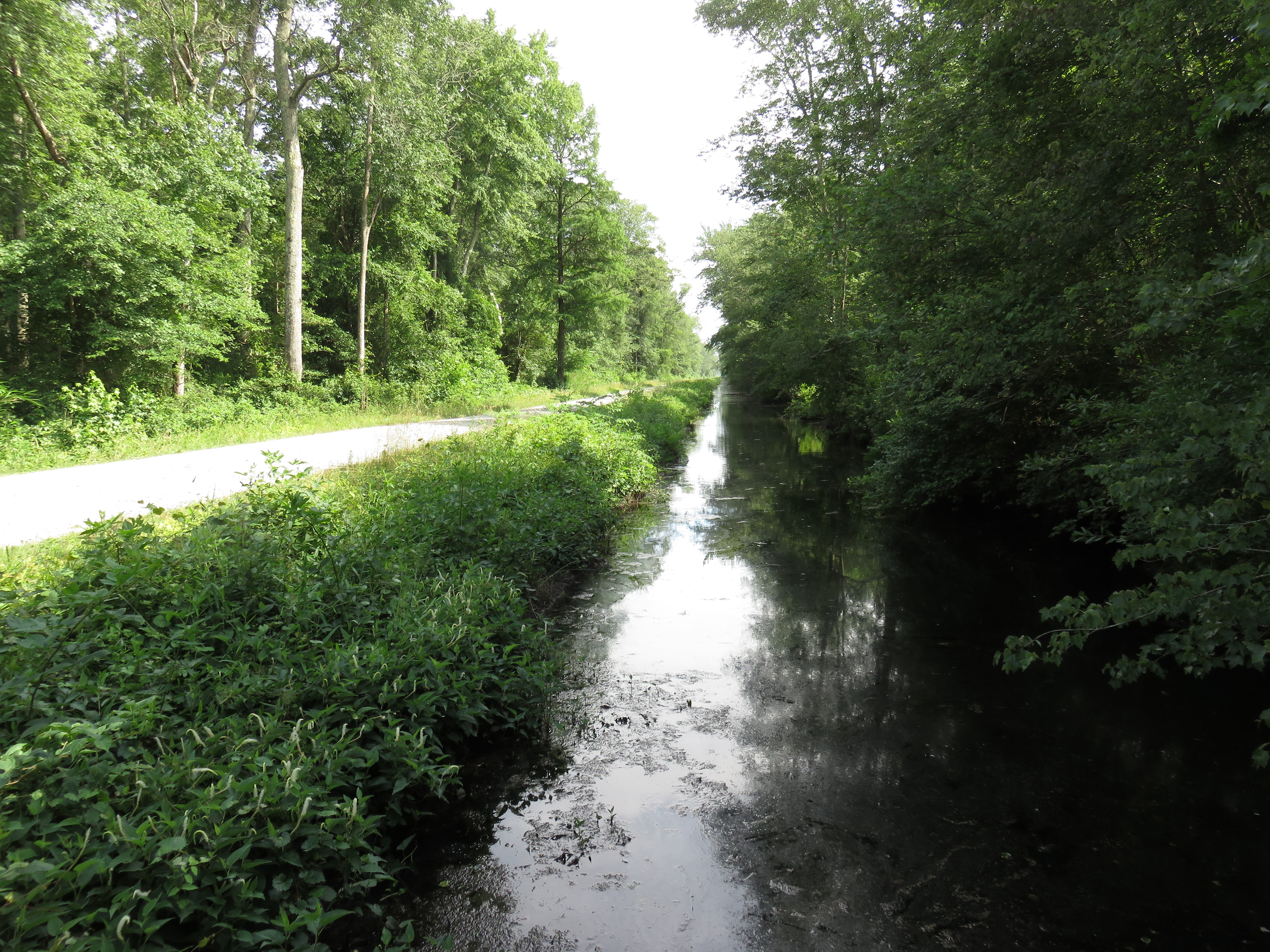
Washington Ditch in the Great Dismal Swamp National Wildlife Refuge in 2016

The Great Dismal Swamp National Wildlife Refuge was created in 1974 to help protect and preserve a portion of the Great Dismal Swamp, a marshy region on the Coastal Plain of southeastern Virginia and northeastern North Carolina between Norfolk, Virginia, and Elizabeth City, North Carolina in the United States. It is located in parts of the independent cities of Chesapeake and Suffolk in Virginia, and the counties of Camden, Gates, and Pasquotank in North Carolina.

== Description ==
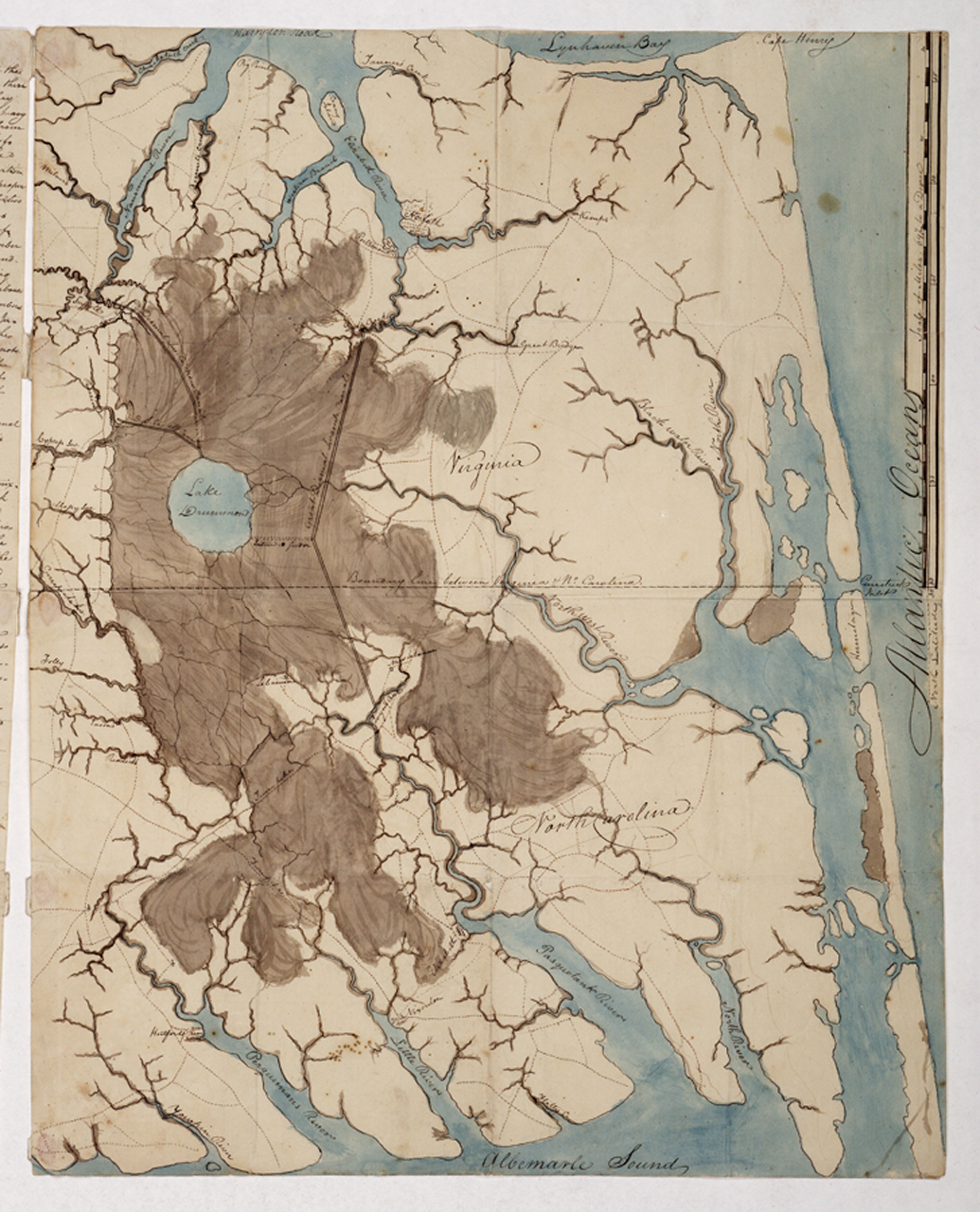
Sketch map of the Great Dismal Swamp in 1807

The Great Dismal Swamp is a southern swamp, the northernmost of many swamps along the Atlantic Ocean's coast, including the Everglades and the Big Cypress in Florida, the Okefenokee of Georgia, the Congress and Four Holes swamps of South Carolina, and some of the Carolina Bays.

Essential to the swamp ecosystem are its water resources, native vegetative communities, and varied wildlife species. It is one of the last large wild areas remaining in the Eastern United States.

== History ==
The Great Dismal Swamp is in southeastern Virginia and northeastern North Carolina between the James River (Norfolk, Virginia) and the Albemarle Sound (Edenton, North Carolina). The aboriginal swamp was estimated to be over 1,000,000 acres (400,000 ha); however, human encroachment has destroyed up to 90% of the original swampland.

Beginning in the 1660s, an established community of escaped slaves known as the Great Dismal Swamp maroons lived freely within the Great Dismal Swamp. Most maroons settled in mesic islands, the high and dry parts of the swamp. Maroons were not the only people who lived inside the swamp – some residents had bought their freedom, others were still slaves who lived semi-independently. In addition, some escaped slaves used the swamp as a stop on the Underground Railroad as they made their way further north. Nearby whites often left the maroons alone so long as they paid a quota in logs or shingles.

After centuries of logging and other human activities that devastated the swamp's ecosystems, in 1973, the Union Camp Corporation donated 49,100 acres (199 km^{2}) of land. The Great Dismal Swamp National Wildlife Refuge was established by the U.S. Congress through The Dismal Swamp Act of 1974. The Refuge has grown to just over 112,000 acres (45,000 ha) in size.

In 1805, the Dismal Swamp Canal began serving as a commercial highway for timber coming out of the swamp. The canal continues to serve recreational boaters as part of the Atlantic Intracoastal Waterway, administered by the United States Army Corps of Engineers.

== Habitat and wildlife ==
The refuge consists of over 112,000 acres (450 km^{2}) of forested wetlands. Lake Drummond, a 3,100-acre (13 km^{2}) natural lake, is located in the heart of the swamp. Outside the boundaries of the National Refuge, the state of North Carolina has preserved and protected additional portions of the swamp.

The Great Dismal Swamp National Wildlife Refuge is located not only between two states, but also between two eco-regions, allowing for a wide range of plant and animal species. Bald cypress, black gum, maple, Atlantic white cedar, and pine are the predominant tree species found on the refuge and support the wildlife within. Many mammals, including black bears, bobcats, otters, and weasels along with over 70 species of reptiles and amphibians call the swamp home. More than 200 bird species can be seen at the swamp throughout the year, while 96 of those are known to nest on the refuge. The peak influx of neotropical migratory songbirds, such as numerous species of warblers, is from late April to mid-May. In 2022, a population of the aquatic orchid Habenaria repens was located within the refuge, the first verified report of the species in Virginia.

== Recreation ==
The refuge is open daily during daylight hours. There is no entrance fee. The refuge headquarters, at the western edge of the refuge, is open on weekdays, except national holidays.

Visitor activities include birdwatching, photography, hiking, bicycling, boating and canoeing (a boat-launching ramp, offering access to Lake Drummond, is provided onto the Feeder Ditch, at the eastern edge of the refuge), fishing, and deer hunting on parts of the refuge during the designated season. Camping is permitted at a campsite maintained by the Army Corps of Engineers on the feeder ditch canal close to Lake Drummond.

Lake Drummond is the middle of activity in the swamp today, though, with many fishermen, sightseers, and boaters. Boat tours are given from the Dismal Swamp Canal, to Lake Drummond.

Hiking opportunities include the nearly .75-mile (1.21 km) (wheelchair-accessible) Dismal Town Boardwalk Trail, located on Washington Ditch Road, that winds through part of the swamp habitat; a number of the refuge's unpaved roads that are also open to bicycling; and the Dismal Swamp Canal Trail, an 8.5-mile (13.7 km) former section of Route 17 converted into a multi-use trail. The Dismal Swamp Canal Trail follows the eastern side of the swamp from a trailhead near Dominion Blvd south to within 1.5 miles (2.4 km) of the North Carolina border.
