= Amina Luqman-Dawson =

American writer

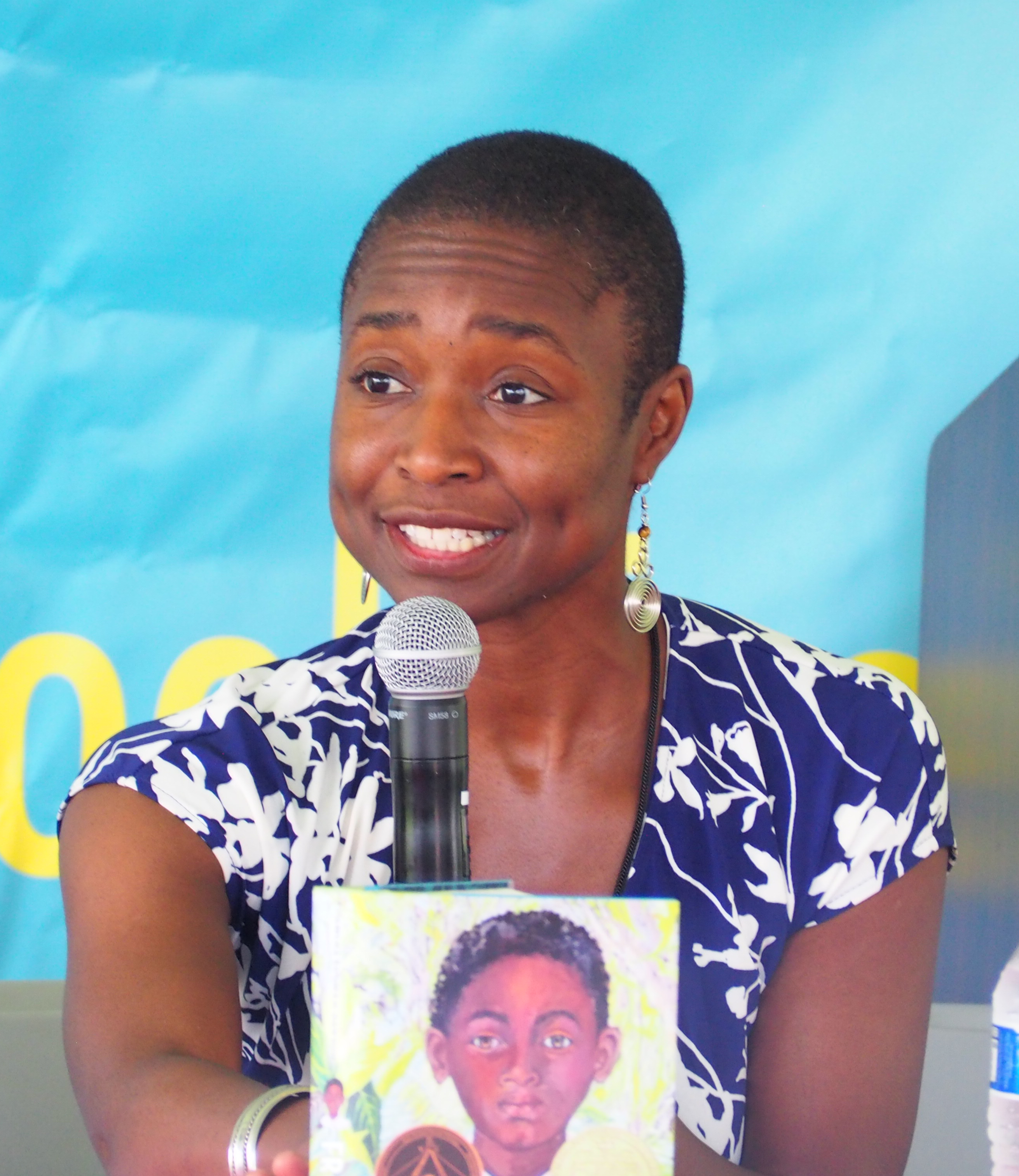
Luqman-Dawson in 2023

Amina Luqman-Dawson is an American writer and author of the book Freewater. She is also the author of the pictorial book Images of America: African Americans of Petersburg and has published op-eds in both The Washington Post and San Francisco Chronicle. She is the first black woman to win both the Newbery Medal and Coretta Scott King Book Award, which she won for the children's book Freewater in 2023.
