= Great Dismal Swamp =

Swamp in Virginia and North Carolina, US

Coordinates: 36°38′27″N 76°27′06″W

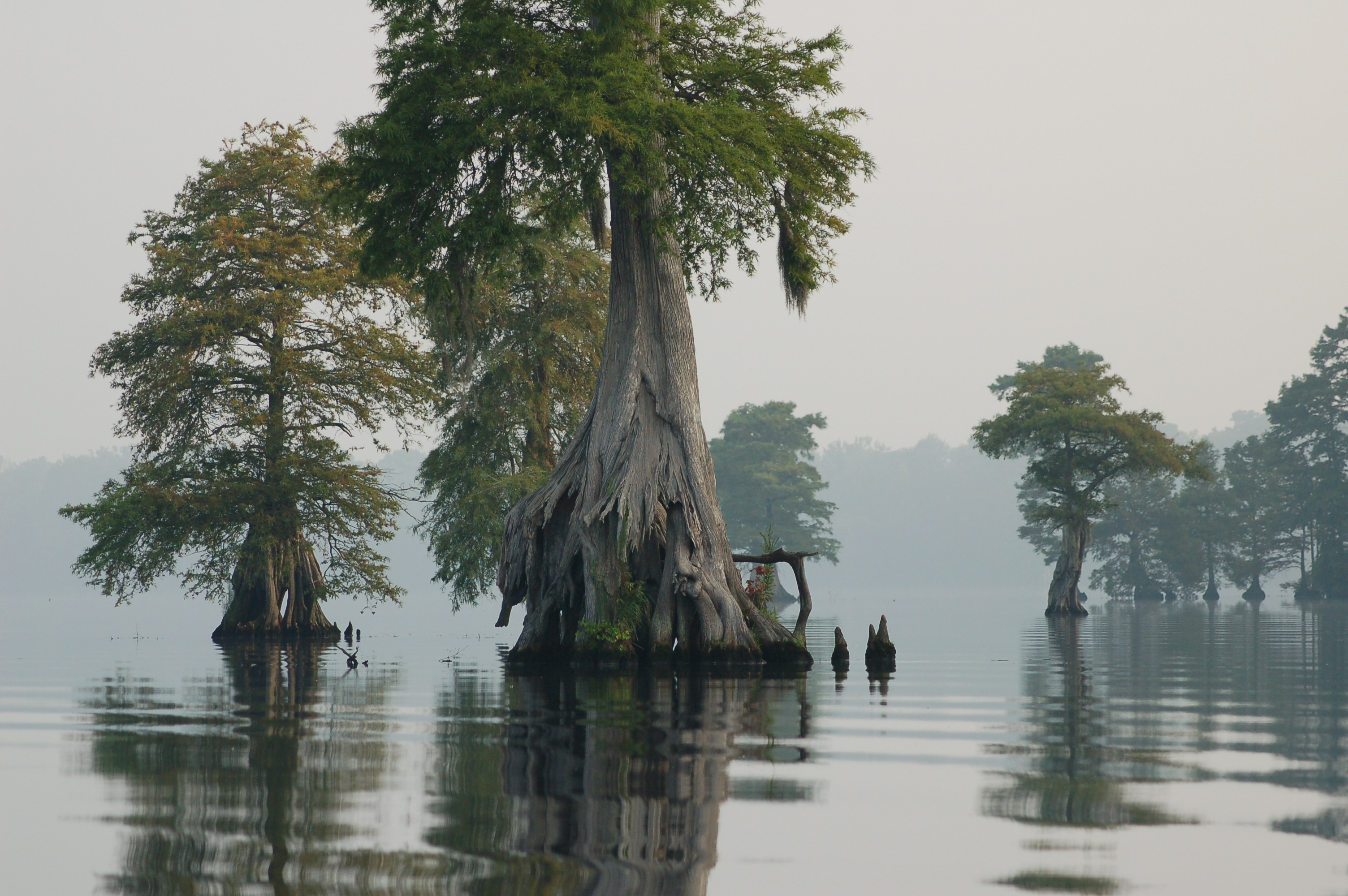
Bald cypress in Lake Drummond, Great Dismal Swamp National Wildlife Refuge, Virginia

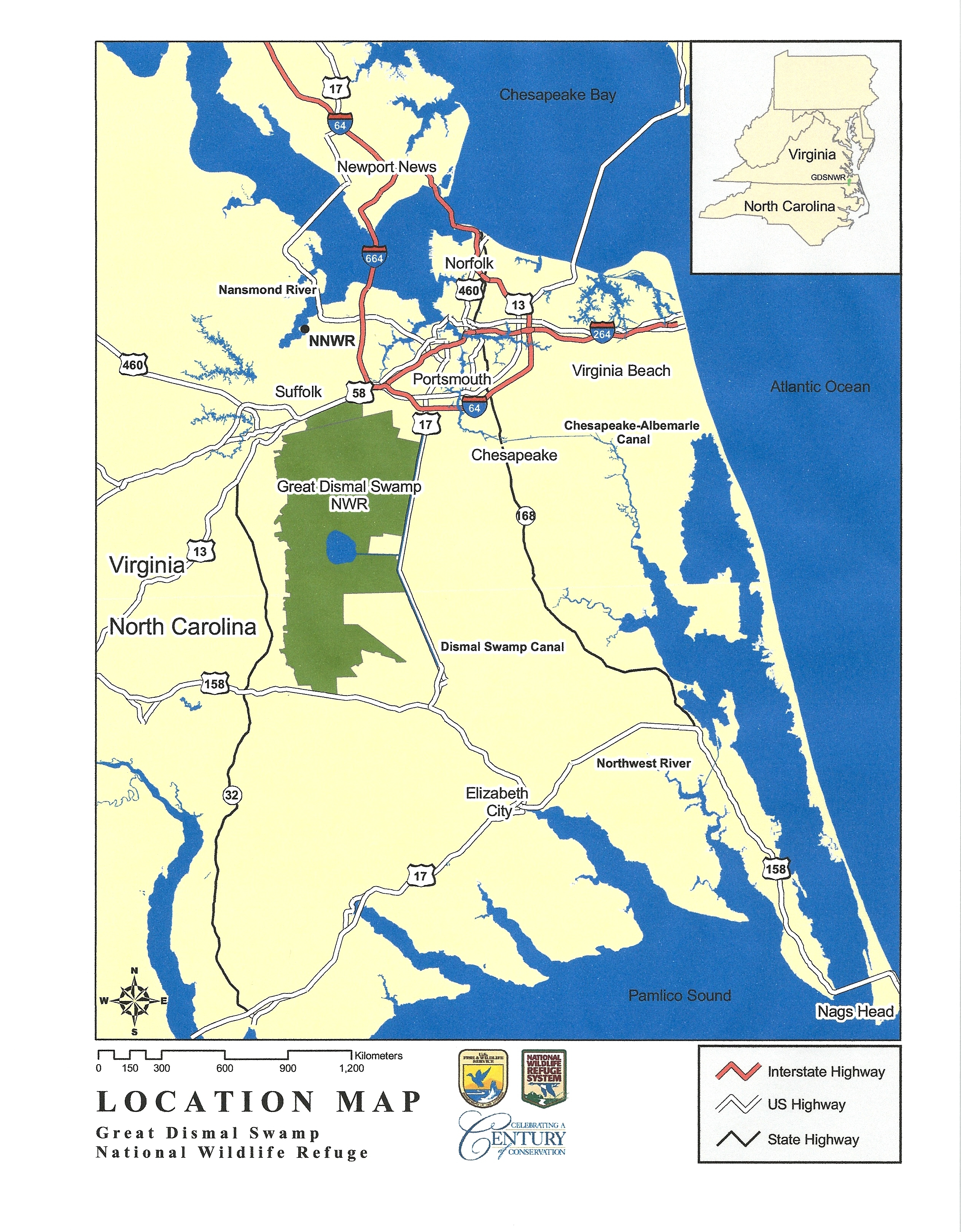
Map of the Great Dismal Swamp

The Great Dismal Swamp is a large swamp in the Coastal Plain Region of southeastern Virginia and northeastern North Carolina in the Eastern United States, between Norfolk, Virginia, and Elizabeth City, North Carolina. It is located in parts of the southern Virginia independent cities of Chesapeake and Suffolk and northern North Carolina counties of Gates, Pasquotank, and Camden. Some estimates place the original size of the swamp at over one million acres (4,000 km^{2}). As of 2022 the size of the Great Dismal Swamp is around 750 square miles (480,000 acres; 1,900 km^{2}).

Lake Drummond, a 3,100-acre (13 km^{2}) natural lake, is located in the heart of the swamp. Lake Drummond is a circular body of water, and is one of only two naturally occurring freshwater lakes in Virginia. Along the Great Dismal Swamp's eastern edge runs the Dismal Swamp Canal. The canal is 22 miles long, and was completed in 1805 to provide a pathway for trade between the Chesapeake Bay, Virginia and the Albemarle Sound in North Carolina. The largest water supply for the Dismal Swamp Canal is through Lake Drummond.

The Great Dismal Swamp National Wildlife Refuge was created in 1973 when the Union Camp Corporation of Franklin, Virginia, donated 49,100 acres (19,900 ha) of land after centuries of logging and other human activities devastated the swamp's ecosystems. The refuge was officially established through the Dismal Swamp Act of 1974, and consists of over 167 square miles (433 square km) of forested wetlands. Outside the boundaries of the refuge, the state of North Carolina has preserved and protected additional portions of the swamp through the establishment of the Dismal Swamp State Park. That park protects 22 square miles (57 km^{2}) of forested wetland.

The swamp was a refuge location for the Great Dismal Swamp maroons, including enslaved people in the Southern states before the American Civil War, and Native Americans who were escaping colonial expansion. Prior to the maroons inhabiting the swamp, it was inhabited by Algonquian-speaking Native American coastal tribes.

A 45,611-acre (184.58 km^{2}) remnant of the original swamp was declared a National Natural Landmark in 1973, in recognition of its unique combination of geological and ecological features.

== History ==
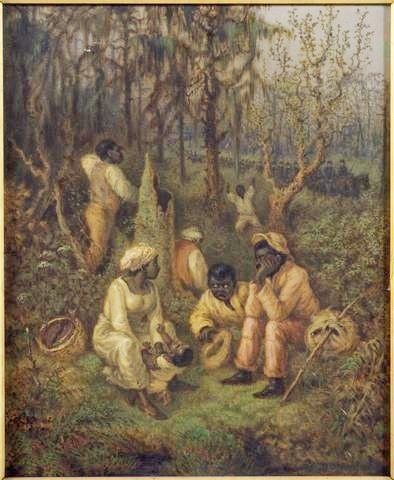
Fugitive Slaves in the Dismal Swamp, 1888, by David Edward Cronin

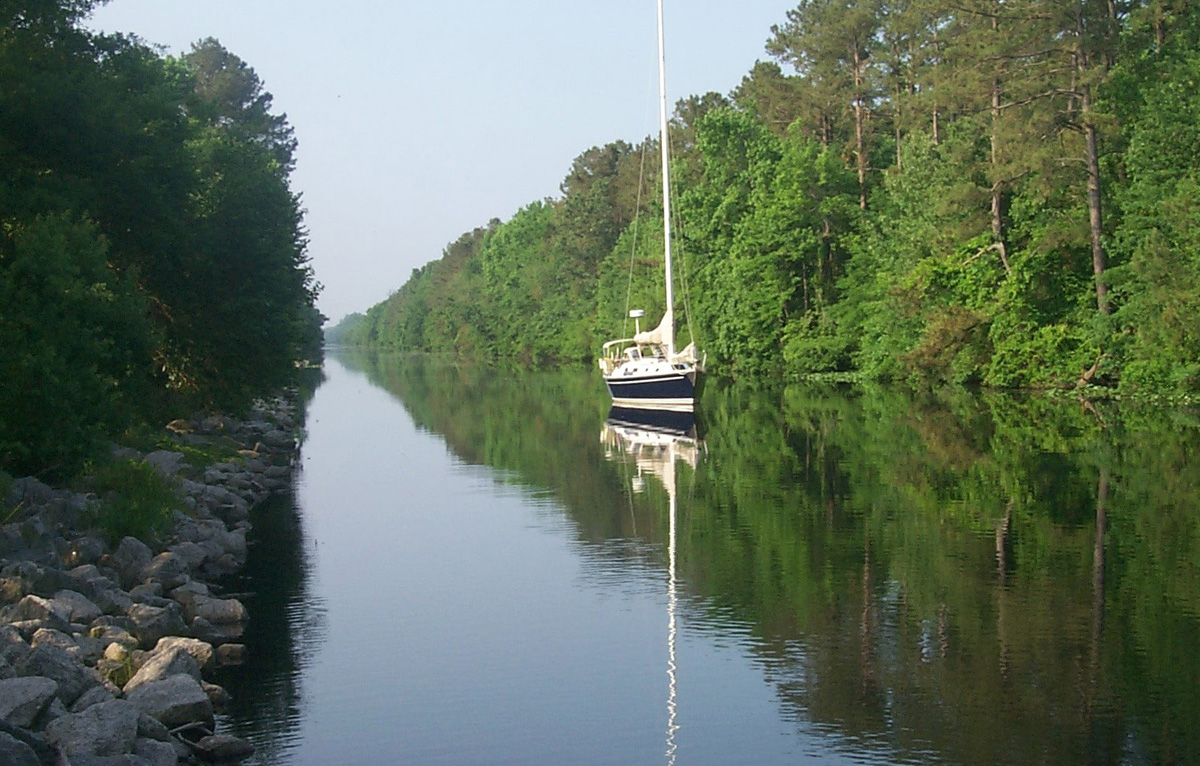
Great Dismal Swamp Canal

The origin of Lake Drummond is not entirely clear, as there is no apparent network of natural streams emptying into the lake.

Archaeological evidence suggests varying cultures of humans have inhabited the swamp for 13,000 years. The Powhatan empire extended to the northern edge of the Great Dismal Swamp around the time of the settling of Jamestown (circa 1600), displacing the Chesapeake tribe residing there before. By 1650, Algonquian-speaking Native Americans of coastal tribes lived in the swamp.

In 1665, William Drummond, the first governor of North Carolina, was the first European recorded as discovering the swamp's lake, which was subsequently named for him. In 1728, William Byrd II, while leading a land survey to establish a boundary between the Virginia and North Carolina colonies, made many observations of the swamp, none of them favorable; he is credited with naming it the Dismal Swamp. At this time, the swamp was estimated to cover around 2,000 square miles. Settlers did not appreciate the ecological importance of wetlands. In 1763, George Washington visited the area, and he and others founded the Dismal Swamp Company in a venture to drain the swamp and clear it for settlement. The company later turned to the more profitable goal of timber harvesting.

Based on archeological findings, Native American communities fled to the Swamp for refuge from the colonial frontier. Along with the Native American communities, there were also multiple populations of African Americans taking refuge in the Swamp in early American History, many of them fleeing slavery due to the Atlantic slave trade. These Great Dismal Swamp maroons consisted of thousands of escaped Black refugee slaves by the year 1860. They were able to find shelter, community and society in the swamp that was not readily available in the world outside the swamp. J.D. Smyth wrote of the maroons in his 1784 novel: A Tour in the United States,

Run-away(s) have resided in these places for twelve, twenty, or thirty years and upwards, subsisting themselves upon corn, hogs, and fowls that they raised on some of the spots not perpetually under water, nor subject to be flooded, as forty-nine parts out of fifty are; and on such spots they have erected habitations and cleared small fields around them."

Excavations reveal island communities existing until the Civil War. Charlie, a maroon who worked illegally in a lumber camp in the swamp, later recalled that there were whole families of maroons living in the Dismal Swamp, some of whom had never seen a White man.

The Underground Railroad Education Pavilion, an exhibit set up to educate visitors about the fugitive slaves who lived in the swamp, was opened February 24, 2012.

The Dismal Swamp Canal was authorized by Virginia in 1787 and by North Carolina in 1790. Construction began in 1793 and was completed in 1805. The canal, as well as a railroad constructed through part of the swamp in 1830, enabled the harvest of timber. The canal deteriorated after the Albemarle and Chesapeake Canal was completed in 1858. In 1929, the United States Government bought the Dismal Swamp Canal and began to improve it. The canal remains the oldest operating artificial waterway in the country. Like the Albemarle and Chesapeake canals, it is part of the Atlantic Intracoastal Waterway.

== Preservation ==
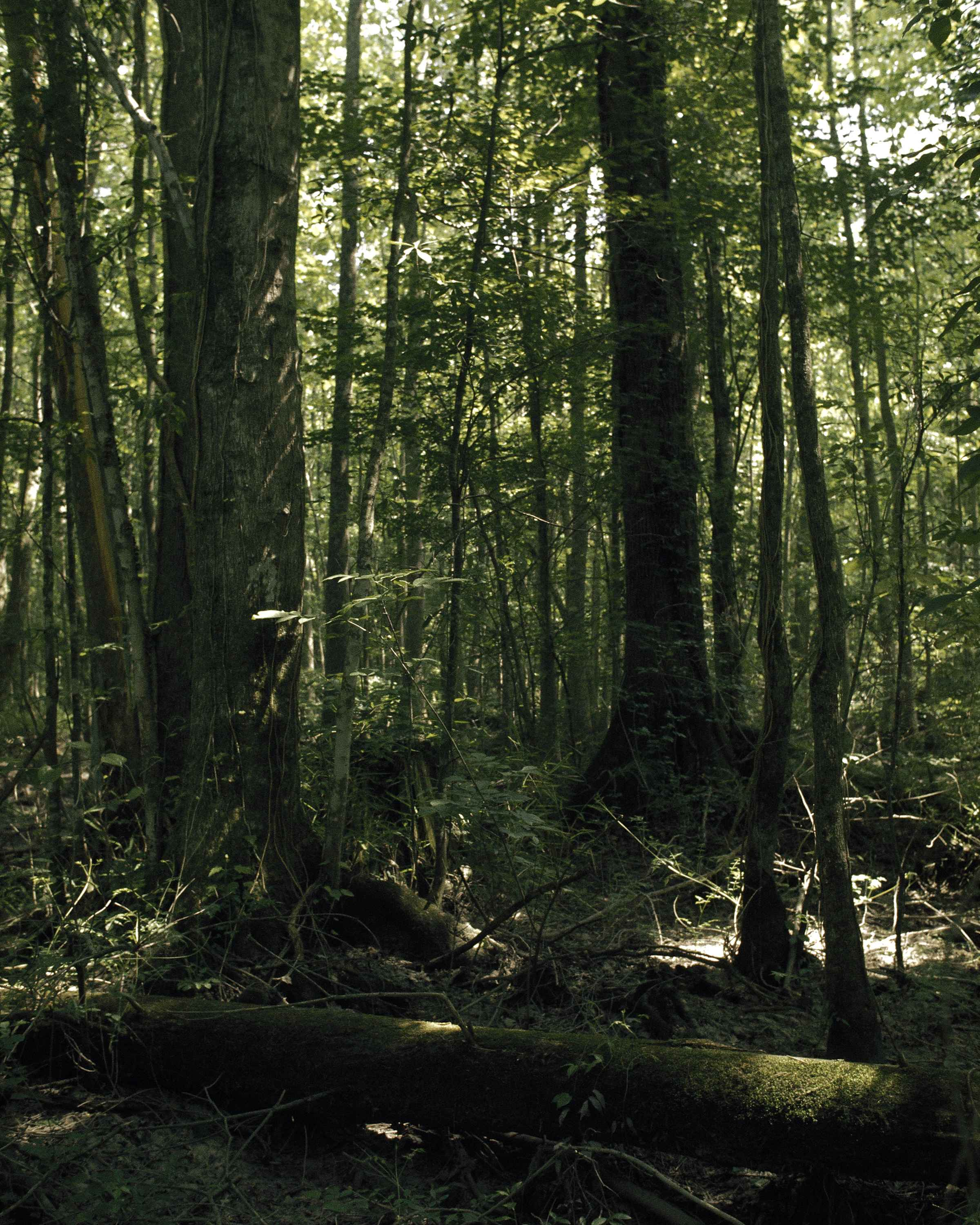
Forested wetland within the Great Dismal Swamp

In the mid-20th century, conservation groups across the United States began demanding the preservation of the remaining Great Dismal Swamp and restoration of its wetlands, by then understood as critical habitat for a wide variety of birds, animals, plants, and other living things. This area is along the Atlantic Flyway of migrating species. In 1973, the Union Camp Corporation, a paper company based in Franklin, Virginia, with large land holdings in the area, donated just over 49,000 acres (200 km^{2}) of land to The Nature Conservancy, which the following year transferred the property to the U.S. Fish and Wildlife Service. During this time, a 45,611-acre (184.58 km^{2}) portion of the swamp was declared a National Natural Landmark by the National Park Service in 1973 due to its unique combination of geological and ecological features.

The Great Dismal Swamp National Wildlife Refuge was officially established by the U.S. Congress through the Dismal Swamp Act of 1974. The refuge consists of almost 107,000 acres (430 km^{2}) of forested wetlands, including the 3,100-acre (13 km^{2}) Lake Drummond at its center. The refuge's resource management programs aim to restore and maintain the natural biodiversity that once existed in the swamp, including its water resources, native vegetation communities, and wildlife species. Water control structures in the ditches help conserve and manage water, while forest management activities that simulate the ecological effects of wildfires are used to restore and maintain plant diversity. Wildlife is managed by ensuring the presence of required habitats, with hunting used to balance some wildlife populations with available food supplies.

A National Heritage Area designation for the Great Dismal Swamp, which would include Chesapeake, Norfolk, Portsmouth, and Suffolk, and Isle of Wight County in Virginia and the counties of Camden, Currituck, Gates, and Pasquotank in North Carolina, has been the subject of feasibility studies by the National Park Service since August 2023.

== Contemporary swamp ==
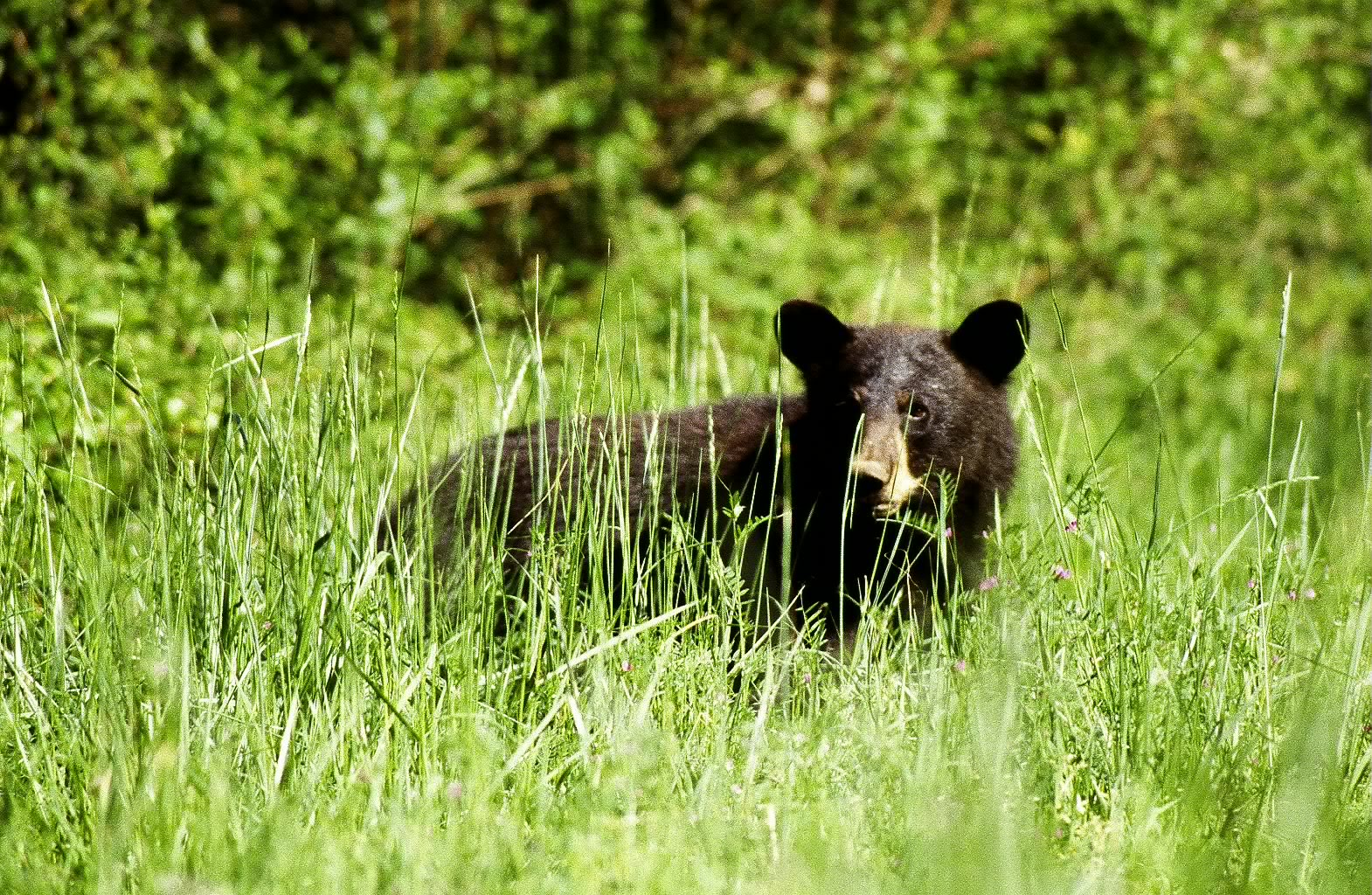
Black bear within the Great Dismal Swamp

The Great Dismal Swamp lies wholly within the Middle Atlantic coastal forests ecoregion. The swamp harbors a wide range of plant and animal species. Bald cypress, tupelo, maple, Atlantic white cypress, pine, and other tree species found on the refuge support the fauna within. In a survey undertaken from 1973 to 1976, some 334 plants from 100 plant families were found. The swamp is home to many mammals, including black bears, bobcats, otters, and weasels, as well as over 70 reptile and amphibian species. There are 213 bird species to be seen within the swamp throughout the year, including 96 nesting species, and birders are common within the prime birding months of April through June. Once home to American alligators, the swamp receives occasional vagrants from North Carolina to the south.

Lake Drummond is the center of activity in the swamp, attracting fishermen, sightseers, and boaters. Camping is not allowed on the refuge.

== See also ==
- List of National Natural Landmarks in Virginia
- List of National Natural Landmarks in North Carolina
- Great Dismal Swamp Maroons
- Dismal Swamp Canal
- Blackwater National Wildlife Refuge
- Carolina Bays
- Cuvette Centrale
- Everglades
- Ginini Flats Wetlands Ramsar Site
- Great Black Swamp
- Great Cypress Swamp
- Great Swamp National Wildlife Refuge
- Kopuatai Peat Dome
- Mer Bleue Bog
- Mountain Bogs National Wildlife Refuge
- Okefenokee Swamp
- Pocosin
- Zekiah Swamp
