= Lake Drummond =

Lake in Virginia, United States

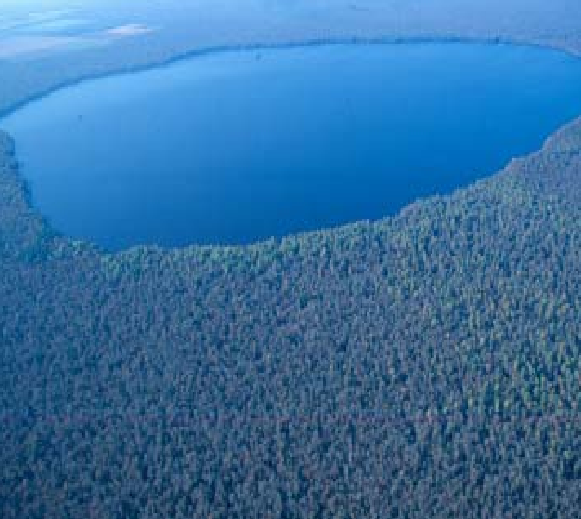
- Lake Drummond is one of only two natural freshwater lakes in Virginia. Mountain Lake is the other.

- Location within Virginia Location within the United States
- Location: Chesapeake and Suffolk, Virginia
- Coordinates: 36°36′08″N 76°28′13″W
- Type: Natural lake
- Basin countries: United States
- Surface area: 3,142 acres (13 km^{2})
- Max. depth: 6 ft (2 m)
- Surface elevation: 13 ft (4 m)

Lake Drummond is a freshwater lake of uncertain origin at the center of the Great Dismal Swamp, a marshy region on the Coastal Plain of southeastern Virginia and northeastern North Carolina, between Norfolk, Virginia, and Elizabeth City, North Carolina. Its surface area is approximately 3,142 acres (13 km^{2}) and its maximum depth is 6 ft (2 m). It is managed by the United States Fish and Wildlife Service.

Lake Drummond is one of only two natural freshwater lakes in Virginia. The other, Mountain Lake in Giles County, is also of unknown origin. Both are lakes essentially on top of hills. Drummond is the highest point in the Dismal Swamp, with nine small ditches flowing out of it.

== Formation ==
Geologists believe the Great Dismal Swamp was formed when the continental shelf experienced sudden settling. The entire swamp is underlain by a layer of peat. Several theories exist about the lake's origin. Some postulate that it was created by a large underground peat fire 3,500–6,000 years ago. Native American legends speak of "the fire bird" creating Lake Drummond. Other theories include a meteorite impact and a tectonic shift.

== History ==
The precise time of the Great Dismal Swamp's discovery and settlement is not known, but archaeological evidence indicates human occupation began nearly 13,000 years ago. By 1650, few Native Americans remained in the area, and European settlers showed little interest in the swamp.

The lake was named for William Drummond, a future governor of North Carolina, who found the lake in 1666 during a hunting trip from which he was the sole survivor.

Several centuries of exploitation and logging reduced the swamp to about 50% of its original size. It was common practice for merchant ships of the time to fill up water casks with the dark-stained water from Lake Drummond. With its high tannin content, the water stayed fresh longer on trans-Atlantic Ocean voyages than water from other sources.

== Wildlife refuge ==
Lake Drummond and much of the Great Dismal Swamp are within the bounds of the Great Dismal Swamp National Wildlife Refuge, officially established through the Dismal Swamp Act of 1974. The refuge includes almost 107,000 acres (43,000 ha) of forest wetlands. North Carolina established a state park to protect another portion of the swamp. Dismal Swamp State Park protects 22 square miles (57 km^{2}) of forested wetland.

Due to relatively low pH levels caused by the leaching of acidic materials from surrounding peat soils, the lake has a relatively low level of nutrients. A few species of fish are present, including crappie, bowfin, and longnose gar.

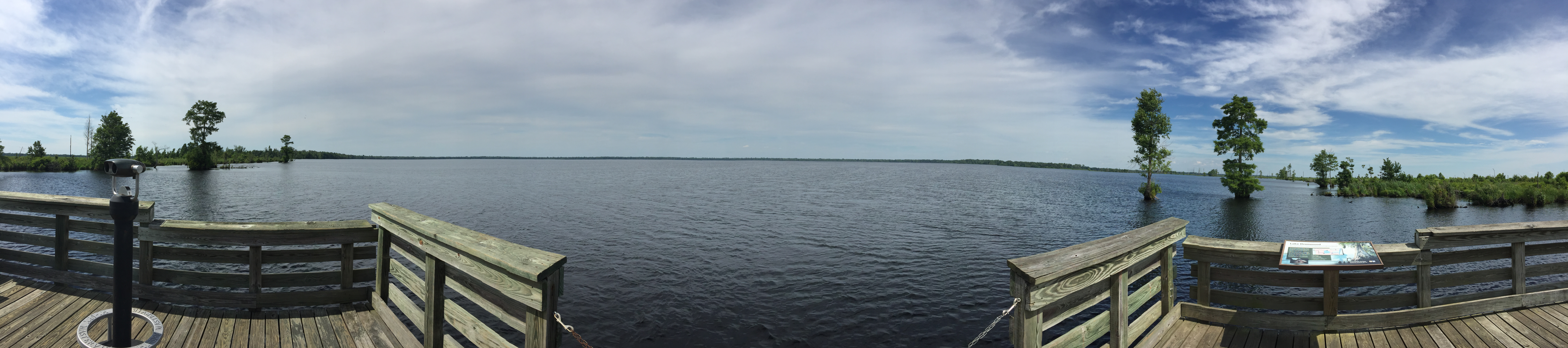
Panoramic image of Lake Drummond

== Folklore ==
The folklore story "Phantom Lovers of Dismal Swamp" is based entirely around this area. "Wicked John and the Devil", a story in Grandfather Tales, a collection of folktales edited by Richard Chase, tells of a man whom even the devil feared, who when he died was given a red-hot coal by the devil, and told to go to the Great Dismal Swamp to make his own hell. According to the tale, he can be seen wandering the swamp at night with his red-hot coal.
