= David Edward Cronin =

American painter (1839–1925)

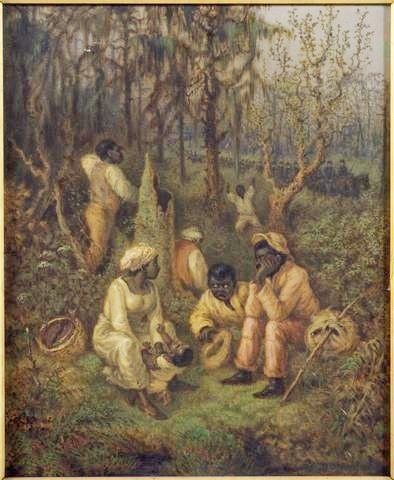
- Fugitive Slaves in the Dismal Swamp, Virginia, 1888, oil on canvas
- Born: July 12, 1839; Greenwich, New York, US
- Died: June 9, 1925 (aged 85)
- Other name: Seth Eyland
- Occupations: Painter; Illustrator; Journalist
- Known for: Düsseldorf school of painting

David Edward Cronin, also known by his pseudonym Seth Eyland, (July 12, 1839 – June 9, 1925) was an American painter, illustrator and journalist.

== Life and career ==
=== Early life ===
Cronin was born in Greenwich, New York. He was a childhood friend of President Chester A. Arthur. After studying the arts in Troy, New York, he moved to New York City in 1855. He spent the years from 1857 in Europe, where he probably studied for one year at the Kunstakademie Düsseldorf. He is considered a member of the Düsseldorf school of painting. Cronin returned to the U.S. in 1860, joined the army and worked for Harper's Magazine.

=== Civil War ===
During the American Civil War Cronin was a Union officer and Provost Marshal of Williamsburg. He authored a detailed history of Williamsburg during the civil war in 1864 in his book The Vest Mansion, Its Historical and Romantic Associations as Confederate and Union Headquarters (1862-1865) in the American Civil War. He served as an officer of the New York Black Horse Cavalry for some time and wrote a "graphic story of the night his command waited transportation southward and slept on the platforms and the Market street pavement". He met with slaves and saw for himself the effect slavery had on their lives as well as the persecution of escaped slaves by federal commissioners in order to return them to their owners, based on the Fugitive Slave Act of 1850.

=== Postwar career ===
After the war, Cronin worked as a journalist in Binghamton, New York, as a lawyer in New York City and for a railroad company in Texas. In the late 1870s, he returned to New York, where he illustrated books.

From 1879 to 1903, Cronin also worked as a political caricaturist. One notable commission was to illustrate a two-volume book on the "Personal Memoirs of U.S. Grant" with 255 original pen-and-ink and watercolor sketches. He spent the last 35 years of his life in Philadelphia where he died.

=== Paintings ===
Cronin's paintings include An Old Picture Gallery (1878), The Evolution of a Life (1884), and Fugitive Slaves in the Dismal Swamp, Virginia (1888). This painting was possibly a response to Henry Wadsworth Longfellow's poem, "The Slave in the Dismal Swamp" (1842), beginning: "In dark fens of the Dismal Swamp / The hunted Negro lay".
