= List of primary state highways in Virginia =

- Primary and secondary State Route shields

System information
- Notes: Outside cities, some towns, and two counties, every road is state-maintained. These roads are split into Primary and Secondary State Routes, and receive different levels of funding. Inside cities, most Primary State Routes are locally maintained.

Highway names
- Interstates: Interstate X (I-X)
- US Highways: U.S. Route X (US X)
- State: State Route X (SR X) or Virginia Route X (VA X)

System links
- Virginia Routes; Interstate; US; Primary; Secondary; Byways; History; HOT lanes

Primary State Highways in the U.S. state of Virginia, are numbered and maintained by the Virginia Department of Transportation as a system of state highways. Primary State Routes receive more funding than Secondary State Routes and are numbered as U.S. Routes or State Routes with numbers from 1 to 599. State Route 785 and State Route 895 are also primary routes, numbered as Interstate Highway spurs. Former numbers are reused often; only 29 of the numbers from 1 to 421 are not in use, with only seven of these under 260.

== List of primary routes ==
Number	Length (mi)	Length (km)	Southern or western terminus	Northern or eastern terminus	Formed	Removed	Notes
SR 1	196.55	316.32	North Carolina	Washington D.C.	1918	1923	now US 1
SR 2	53.08	85.42	Richmond	Fredericksburg	1933	current	
SR 2	230.37	370.74	North Carolina	Maryland	1918	1923	now US 15
SR 3	150.0	241.4	Culpeper	Gloucester	1933	current	
SR 3	—	—	Ridgeway	Rest	1918	1923	
SR 4	11.02	17.73	North Carolina	east of Boydton	1952	current	
SR 4	129.06	207.70	North Carolina	Maryland	1918	1923	now US 13
SR 4	135.60	218.23	West Virginia	Richmond	1933	1938	now US 33
SR 4	406.43	654.09	West Virginia	Norfolk	1940	1947	now US 460
SR 5	55.18	88.80	Richmond	Williamsburg	1933	current	
SR 5	48.71	78.39	Templeton	North Carolina	1918	1923	
SR 6	102.3	164.6	Afton	Richmond	1933	current	
SR 6	86.0	138.4	West Virginia	Maryland	1918	1923	now US 50
SR 7	72.75	117.08	Winchester	Alexandria	1933	current	
SR 7	150.0	241.4	Culpeper	Gloucester	1918	1923	now VA 3
SR 8	55.88	89.93	North Carolina	Christiansburg	1933	current	
SR 8	255.83	411.72	North Carolina	Winchester	1918	1923	now US 17
SR 9	13.08	21.05	West Virginia	west of Leesburg	1940	current	
SR 9	—	—	—	—	1918	1923	
SR 9	29.27	47.11	Woodbridge	east of McLean	1933	1940	now VA 123
SR 10	93.58	150.60	Richmond	Suffolk	1918	current	
SR 11	—	—	—	—	1918	1933	
SR 12	508.0	817.5	Tennessee	Virginia Beach	1918	1933	now US 58
SR 12	—	—	Troutville	Clifton Forge	1933	1935	now US 220
SR 12	122.6	197.3	near Stuarts Draft	Maryland	1935	1953	now US 340
SR 13	24.08	38.75	east of Cumberland	east of Powhatan	1918	current	
SR 13	24.08	38.75	Norfolk		1938	1943	
SR 14	71.10	114.42	St. Stephens Church	Bayside	1933	current	
SR 14	—	—	North Carolina	West Virginia	1918	1933	
SR 15	85.0	136.8	North Carolina	Maryland	1923	1933	now US 52
SR 15	—	—	—	—	1918	1923	
SR 16	77.58	124.85	North Carolina	West Virginia	1940	current	
SR 16	—	—	—	—	1918	1940	
SR 17	—	—	—	—	1918	1933	
SR 17	255.83	411.72	North Carolina	Winchester	1933	1965	now US 17
SR 18	25.86	41.62	Paint Bank	Covington	1933	current	
SR 18	—	—	—	—	1918	1933	
SR 19	—	—	—	—	1918	1933	
SR 20	89.79	144.50	Dillwyn	Wilderness	1933	current	
SR 20	—	—	—	—	1918	1933	
SR 21	—	—	—	—	1918	1933	
SR 22	29.81	47.97	Shadwell	Mineral	1933	current	
SR 22	—	—	—	—	1918	1933	
SR 23	—	—	—	—	1918	1933	
SR 24	89.57	144.15	Roanoke	west of Buckingham	1933	current	
SR 24	—	—	—	—	1918	1933	
SR 25	—	—	—	—	1918	1933	
SR 26	12.83	20.65	Appomattox	Bent Creek	1933	current	
SR 26	—	—	—	—	1918	1933	
SR 27	2.54	4.09	Arlington	District of Columbia	1964	current	
SR 27	—	—	—	—	1918	1940	
SR 27	—	—	—	—	1940	1953	
SR 28	49	79	north of Remington	Sterling	1918	current	
SR 29	—	—	—	—	1923	1933	
SR 29	—	—	—	—	1933	1947	
SR 30	61.87	99.57	south of Doswell	north of Norge	1923	current	
SR 31	24.56	39.53	Wakefield	west of Williamsburg	1933	current	
SR 31	—	—	—	—	1923	1933	
SR 32	38.89	62.59	North Carolina	Newport News	1940	current	
SR 32	—	—	—	—	1923	1933	
SR 32	—	—	—	—	1933	1940	
SR 33	72.23	116.24	Richmond	Stingray Point	1938	current	
SR 33	—	—	—	—	1923	1933	
SR 33	—	—	—	—	1933	1938	
SR 34	0.54	0.87	South Boston		1942	current	
SR 34	—	—	—	—	1923	1933	
SR 34	—	—	—	—	1933	1940	
SR 35	48.71	78.39	North Carolina	south of Petersburg	1923	current	
SR 36	16.70	26.88	west of Petersburg	Hopewell	1933	current	
SR 36	—	—	—	—	1923	1933	
SR 37	9.10	14.65	Winchester		1965	current	
SR 37	—	—	—	—	1923	1933	
SR 37	—	—	—	—	1933	—	
SR 37	—	—	—	—	—	c. 1940	
SR 37	—	—	—	—	1940	—	
SR 38	7.03	11.31	Amelia	Scotts Fork	1933	current	
SR 38	—	—	—	—	1923	1933	
SR 39	59.17	95.22	West Virginia	Lexington	1940	current	
SR 39	—	—	—	—	1923	1933	
SR 39	—	—	—	—	1933	1940	
SR 40	227.69	366.43	Woolwine	Spring Grove	1933	current	
SR 40	—	—	—	—	1923	1933	
SR 41	22.5	36.2	Danville	Callands	1933	current	
SR 41	—	—	—	—	1923	1933	
SR 42	210.29	338.43	Broadford south of Newport east of Clifton Forge	Poplar Hill; New Castle; Woodstock	1928	current	
SR 43	61.20	98.49	Altavista	north of Eagle Rock	1933	current	
SR 43	—	—	—	—	1928	1933	
SR 44	—	—	—	—	1928	1933	
SR 44	—	—	—	—	1933	1952	
SR 44	—	—	—	—	c. 1963	2000	
SR 45	39.72	63.92	Farmville	Georges Tavern	1928	current	
SR 46	42.57	68.51	North Carolina	west of Blackstone	1940	current	
SR 46	—	—	—	—	1928	1933	
SR 46	—	—	—	—	1933	1940	
SR 47	61.09	98.31	South Hill	Pamplin City	1933	current	
SR 47	—	—	—	—	1928	c. 1930	
SR 47	—	—	—	—	1930	1933	
SR 48	321.2	516.9	unsigned designation for the Blue Ridge Parkway and Skyline Drive from North Carolina to Front Royal		c. 1935	current	
SR 48	—	—	—	—	1928	1934	
SR 49	69.01	111.06	North Carolina	east of Burkeville	1928	current	
SR 50	—	—	—	—	1928	1933	
SR 51	6.20	9.98	west of Danville	Danville	1954	current	
SR 51	—	—	—	—	1928	1950	
SR 52	—	—	—	—	1928	1933	
SR 52	—	—	—	—	1933	c. 1935	
SR 53	18.32	29.48	south of Charlottesville	Palmyra	1947	current	
SR 53	—	—	—	—	1928	1933	
SR 53	—	—	—	—	1933	1940	
SR 54	18.67	30.05	east of Montpelier	north of Hanover	1933	current	
SR 54	—	—	—	—	1928	1933	
SR 55	64.71	104.14	West Virginia	Gainesville	1928	current	
SR 56	60.87	97.96	Steeles Tavern	west of Buckingham	1930	current	
SR 57	88.70	142.75	north of Stuart	west of Halifax	1930	current	
SR 58	—	—	—	—	1930	1933	
SR 59	7.90	12.71	Drakes Branch	Keysville	1957	current	
SR 59	—	—	—	—	1931	1933	
SR 59	—	—	—	—	1933	1940	
SR 59	—	—	—	—	1940	1949	
SR 61	48.16	77.51	Tazewell	Narrows	1933	current	
SR 62	4.01	6.45	North Carolina	east of Danville	1946	current	
SR 62	—	—	—	—	1933	1942	
SR 62	—	—	—	—	1942	1946	
SR 63	39.28	63.22	St. Paul	Haysi	1958	current	
SR 63	—	—	—	—	1933	1946	
SR 64	—	—	—	—	1933	1940	
SR 64	—	—	—	—	1940	1958	
SR 65	34.06	54.81	south of Clinchport	east of St. Paul	1958	current	
SR 65	—	—	—	—	1933	1940	
SR 65	—	—	—	—	1940	1943	
SR 66	—	—	—	—	1933	1940	
SR 66	—	—	—	—	1940	1958	
SR 67	22.36	35.98	east of Honaker	Jewell Ridge	1940	current	
SR 67	—	—	—	—	1933	1940	
SR 68	6.13	9.87	east of Keokee	Appalachia	1933	current	
SR 69	3.59	5.78	east of Austinville	Poplar Camp	1958	current	
SR 69	—	—	—	—	1933	1951	
SR 70	11.88	19.12	Tennessee	Jonesville	1940	current	
SR 70	—	—	—	—	1933	1940	
SR 71	35.82	57.65	Gate City	Lebanon	1933	current	
SR 72	49.19	79.16	north of Gate City	west of Clintwood	1933	current	
SR 73	0.78	1.26	north of Richmond		1958	current	
SR 73	—	—	—	—	1933	1948	
SR 74	2.42	3.89	Norton	east of Norton	1958	current	
SR 74	—	—	—	—	1933	1942	
SR 75	10.51	16.91	Tennessee	Abingdon	1940	current	
SR 75	—	—	—	—	1933	1940	
SR 76	13.04	20.99	west of Richmond	Richmond	1973	current	
SR 76	—	—	—	—	1933	1970	
SR 77	—	—	—	—	1933	1940	
SR 77	—	—	—	—	1940	1942	
SR 78	3.85	6.20	Appalachia	south of Stonega	1946	current	
SR 78	—	—	—	—	1933	1940	
SR 78	—	—	—	—	1940	1944	
SR 79	0.23	0.37	west of Linden		c. 1980	current	
SR 79	—	—	—	—	1933	1953	
SR 79	—	—	—	—	c. 1960	1971	
SR 80	67.37	108.42	Kentucky	Cedarville	1933	current	
SR 81	—	—	—	—	1933	1940	
SR 81	—	—	—	—	1940	1958	
SR 82	6.84	11.01	Cleveland	Lebanon	1933	current	
SR 83	61.71	99.31	Pound	West Virginia	1940	current	
SR 83	—	—	—	—	1933	1940	
SR 84	14.94	24.04	West Virginia	Vanderpool	1940	current	
SR 84	—	—	—	—	1933	1940	
SR 85	—	—	—	—	1933	1958	
SR 86	3.33	5.36	North Carolina	Danville	1933	current	
SR 87	4.10	6.60	North Carolina	Ridgeway	1940	current	
SR 87	—	—	—	—	1933	1940	
SR 88	—	—	—	—	1933	1940	
SR 88	—	—	—	—	1940	1948	
SR 88	—	—	—	—	1957	1957	
SR 88	—	—	—	—	1972	1976	
SR 89	7.85	12.63	North Carolina	Galax	1940	current	
SR 89	—	—	—	—	1933	1938	
SR 90	1.73	2.78	west of Rural Retreat	Rural Retreat	1933	current	
SR 91	55.15	88.76	Tennessee	west of Tazewell	1940	current	
SR 91	—	—	—	—	1933	1940	
SR 92	28.97	46.62	west of Clover	Boydton	1940	current	
SR 92	—	—	—	—	1933	1940	
SR 93	0.92	1.48	North Carolina	east of Mouth of Wilson	1933	current	
SR 94	28.39	45.69	west of Galax	south of Fort Chiswell	1933	current	
SR 95	—	—	—	—	1933	1953	
SR 96	7.83	12.60	south of South Boston	North Carolina	1940	current	
SR 96	—	—	—	—	1933	1940	
SR 97	9.16	14.74	Galax	Blue Ridge Parkway	1933	current	
SR 98	0.50	0.80	Bland		1933	current	
SR 99	5.20	8.37	Pulaski	east of Pulaski	1933	current	
SR 100	53.31	85.79	east of Hillsville	Narrows	1933	current	
SR 101	3.17	5.10	Roanoke		1969	current	
SR 101	—	—	—	—	1933	c. 1940	
SR 101	—	—	—	—	1962	1985	
SR 102	8.20	13.20	Pocahontas	Bluefield	1958	current	
SR 102	—	—	—	—	1933	1954	
SR 103	13.43	21.61	south of Stuart	North Carolina	1933	current	
SR 104	—	—	no current route		c. 1965	2001	now part of U.S. Route 17
SR 104	—	—	—	—	1933	1949	now State Route 773
SR 104	—	—	—	—	c. 1928	1933	now part of U.S. Route 421
SR 104	—	—	—	—	1923	1928	
SR 105	4.90	7.89	Newport News	south of Yorktown	1958	current	
SR 105	—	—	—	—	1933	1942	
SR 106	30.00	48.28	Petersburg	Talleysville	1940	current	
SR 106	—	—	—	—	1933	1940	
SR 107	8.39	13.50	Chilhowie	Saltville	1961	current	
SR 107	—	—	—	—	1933	1953	
SR 108	4.24	6.82	north of Martinsville	Figsboro	1933	current	
SR 109	0.91	1.46	Petersburg	Fort Gregg-Adams	1956	current	
SR 109	—	—	—	—	1933	1946	
SR 110	2.41	3.88	Arlington		1964	current	
SR 110	—	—	—	—	1933	1946	
SR 110	—	—	—	—	1947	1956	
SR 111	2.26	3.64	Christiansburg		1933	current	
SR 112	0.65	1.05	Salem		c. 1965	current	
SR 112	—	—	—	—	1933	1943	
SR 113	1.33	2.14	Bristol		1966	current	
SR 113	—	—	—	—	1933	1942	
SR 114	10.32	16.61	northwest of Radford	Christiansburg	1933	current	
SR 114	—	—	—	—	1923	1928	
SR 114	—	—	—	—	1928	1933	
SR 115	6.00	9.66	Roanoke	north of Roanoke	1933	current	
SR 116	20.66	33.25	Burnt Chimney	Roanoke	1933	current	
SR 117	7.21	11.60	Roanoke	Hollins	1933	current	
SR 118	1.84	2.96	Roanoke	Hollins	1933	current	
SR 119	3.08	4.96	North Carolina	Delila	1964	current	
SR 119	—	—	—	—	1933	1964	
SR 120	9.10	14.65	Arlington		1940	current	
SR 120	—	—	—	—	1933	1940	
SR 121	1.83	2.95	Fort Chiswell	Max Meadows	1933	current	
SR 122	54.58	87.84	east of Rocky Mount	Big Island	1933	current	
SR 123	29.27	47.11	Woodbridge	District of Columbia	1940	current	
SR 123	—	—	—	—	1933	1940	
SR 124	0.87	1.40	Arlington		1948	current	
SR 124	—	—	—	—	1933	1937	
SR 124	—	—	—	—	—	1943	
SR 125	5.73	9.22	Chuckatuck	Driver	1963	current	
SR 125	—	—	—	—	1933	—	
SR 126	1.38	2.22	Onancock	Tasley	c. 1995	current	
SR 126	—	—	—	—	1933	1944	
SR 126	—	—	—	—	1948	1979	
SR 127	3.35	5.39	West Virginia	north of Winchester	1964	current	
SR 127	—	—	—	—	1933	1948	
SR 128	3.47	5.58	Lynchburg		1933	current	
SR 129	3.18	5.12	South Boston	south of Halifax	1933	current	
SR 130	34.69	55.83	Natural Bridge	northeast of Madison Heights	1933	current	
SR 131	1.65	2.66	Appomattox		1933	current	
SR 132	4.09	6.58	Williamsburg	north of Williamsburg	1957	current	
SR 132	—	—	—	—	1933	1943	
SR 132	—	—	—	—	1955	1957	
SR 133	1.19	1.92	Hampden-Sydney	south of Farmville	1933	current	
SR 134	11.63	18.72	Hampton	Tabb	c. 1942	current	
SR 134	—	—	—	—	1933	1942	
SR 135	2.20	3.54	Suffolk		c. 1955	current	
SR 135	—	—	—	—	1933	1945	
SR 136	1.17	1.88	Alberta		1954	current	
SR 136	—	—	—	—	1933	1948	
SR 137	12.03	19.36	Kenbridge	Danieltown	1933	current	
SR 138	16.98	27.33	north of South Hill	Kenbridge	1933	current	
SR 139	1.48	2.38	Jarratt		1944	current	
SR 139	—	—	—	—	1933	1942	
SR 140	0.38	0.61	Abingdon		1960	current	
SR 140	—	—	—	—	1933	1949	
SR 141	3.25	5.23	Portsmouth		c. 1944	current	
SR 141	—	—	—	—	1933	1943	
SR 142	2.73	4.39	southwest of Petersburg	Petersburg	1933	current	
SR 143	35.39	56.95	Norfolk	north of Williamsburg	c. 1945	current	
SR 143	—	—	—	—	1933	1942	
SR 144	13.97	22.48	Centralia	west of Hopewell	1933	current	
SR 145	5.18	8.34	Chesterfield	south of Bensley	1933	current	
SR 146	0.86	1.38	Richmond		1976	current	
SR 146	—	—	—	—	1933	1949	
SR 146	—	—	—	—	1949	1966	
SR 147	13.13	21.13	east of Midlothian	Richmond	1933	current	
SR 148	0.87	1.40	north of Fancy Gap		1980	current	
SR 148	—	—	—	—	1933	1951	
SR 149	1.92	3.09	Virginia Beach		c. 1945	current	
SR 149	—	—	—	—	1933	1942	
SR 150	15.19	24.45	south of Richmond	west of Richmond	1967	current	
SR 150	—	—	—	—	1933	1947	
SR 150	—	—	—	—	1961	1962	
SR 151	35.22	56.68	north of Amherst	east of Afton	1933	current	
SR 152	5.18	8.34	Newport News	Hampton	1946	current	
SR 152	—	—	—	—	1933	1942	
SR 152	—	—	—	—	—	1944	
SR 153	17.15	27.60	east of Blackstone	east of Amelia	1933	current	
SR 154	1.92	3.09	Covington		1962	current	
SR 154	—	—	—	—	1933	1941	
SR 154	—	—	—	—	1941	1958	
SR 155	13.53	21.77	Charles City	Carps Corner	1933	current	
SR 156	57.38	92.34	south of Petersburg	Mechanicsville	1933	current	
SR 157	7.71	12.41	west of Richmond	north of Laurel	1933	current	
SR 158	2.52	4.06	Coeburn	east of Coeburn	1999	current	
SR 158	—	—	—	—	1933	1940	
SR 158	—	—	—	—	1940	1943	
SR 158	—	—	—	—	1947	1970	
SR 159	11.33	18.23	Crows	Callaghan	1947	current	
SR 159	—	—	—	—	1933	1945	
SR 160	8.02	12.91	Kentucky	Appalachia	1940	current	
SR 160	—	—	—	—	1933	1940	
SR 161	13.84	22.27	Richmond	north of Richmond	1933	current	
SR 162	0.17	0.27	east of Williamsburg		1945	current	
SR 162	—	—	—	—	1933	1943	
SR 163	6.74	10.85	Lynchburg	Madison Heights	2005	current	
SR 163	—	—	—	—	1933	1942	
SR 163	—	—	—	—	1945	1993	
SR 164	12.17	19.59	Suffolk	Portsmouth	1968	current	
SR 164	—	—	—	—	1933	1955	
SR 165	39.75	63.97	Chesapeake	Norfolk	1933	current	
SR 166	15.47	24.90	Chesapeake	Virginia Beach	1933	current	
SR 167	—	—	Cloverdale	Cloverdale	2016	current	
SR 167	—	—	—	—	1933	1995	
SR 168	30.11	48.46	North Carolina	Norfolk	1933	current	
SR 169	7.41	11.93	Hampton		1933	current	
SR 170	2.65	4.26	Norfolk		1957	current	
SR 170	—	—	—	—	1933	1940	
SR 170	—	—	—	—	1940	1957	
SR 171	11.20	18.02	Newport News	Poquoson	1933	current	
SR 172	4.85	7.81	Hampton	Poquoson	1933	current	
SR 173	10.84	17.45	Newport News; Suffolk (future)	near Seaford	1933	current	
SR 174	5.58	8.98	Martinsville		1978	current	
SR 174	—	—	—	—	1933	1966	
SR 175	10.83	17.43	north of Oak Hall	Chincoteague	1933	current	
SR 176	2.58	4.15	Parksley	Nelsonia	1933	current	
SR 177	4.41	7.10	south of Radford	Radford	1962	current	
SR 177	—	—	—	—	1933	1959	
SR 178	11.51	18.52	Exmore	north of Pungoteague	1933	current	
SR 179	2.94	4.73	Onancock	Onley	1933	current	
SR 180	11.25	18.11	near Harborton	Wachapreague	1933	current	
SR 181	0.95	1.53	Belle Haven	east of Belle Haven	1933	current	
SR 182	3.71	5.97	Painter	Quinby	1933	current	
SR 183	7.45	11.99	east of Silver Beach	Exmore	1933	current	
SR 184	3.20	5.15	Cape Charles	south of Cheriton	1957	current	
SR 184	—	—	—	—	1933	1953	
SR 185	1.00	1.61	west of Edinburg	Edinburg	1964	current	
SR 185	—	—	—	—	1933	1952	
SR 186	6.21	9.99	North Carolina	Boykins	c. 1970	current	
SR 186	—	—	—	—	1933	1951	
SR 187	5.43	8.74	north of Guilford	Modest Town	1933	current	
SR 188	0.91	1.46	Clifton Forge		c. 1945	current	
SR 188	—	—	—	—	1933	1944	
SR 189	10.82	17.41	south of Franklin	west of Holland	1933	current	
SR 190	15.43	24.83	Chesapeake	Virginia Beach	1956	current	
SR 190	—	—	—	—	1933	1952	
SR 191	3.13	5.04	Chesapeake		1933	current	
SR 192	2.02	3.25	Norfolk		1952	current	
SR 192	—	—	—	—	1933	1947	
SR 192	—	—	—	—	1951	1952	
SR 193	11.79	18.97	Dranesville	Langley	1948	current	
SR 193	—	—	—	—	1933	1945	
SR 194	5.75	9.25	Norfolk		1947	current	
SR 194	—	—	—	—	1933	1946	
SR 195	3.39	5.46	Richmond		1976	current	
SR 195	—	—	—	—	1933	1973	
SR 196	0.96	1.54	Chesapeake		1942	current	
SR 196	—	—	—	—	1933	1942	
SR 197	3.60	5.79	Richmond		—	—	
SR 197	—	—	—	—	1933	1966	
SR 198	23.33	37.55	Glenns	near Mathews	1933	current	
SR 199	14.13	22.74	northwest of Williamsburg	east of Williamsburg	1975	current	
SR 199	—	—	—	—	1933	1957	
SR 200	19.23	30.95	White Stone	Burgess	1933	current	
SR 201	16.17	26.02	south of Lively	Heathsville	1933	current	
SR 202	17.91	28.82	Templeman	Callao	1933	current	
SR 203	9.76	15.71	Lyells	near Kinsale	1933	current	
SR 204	1.73	2.78	George Washington Birthplace National Monument		1933	current	
SR 205	18.47	29.72	east of King George	Oak Grove	1933	current	
SR 206	11.04	17.77	west of King George	Dahlgren	1933	current	
SR 207	1.93	3.11	Carmel Church	south of Bowling Green	1933	current	
SR 208	47.35	76.20	Ferncliff	Four Mile Fork	1950	current	
SR 208	—	—	—	—	1933	1945	
SR 209	0.88	1.42	Virginia's Center for Innovative Technology		1990	current	
SR 209	—	—	—	—	1933	1948	
SR 209	—	—	—	—	1957	1986	
SR 210	3.14	5.05	Madison Heights	east of Madison Heights	c. 1960	current	
SR 210	—	—	—	—	1933	1952	
SR 211	5.63	9.06	Timberville	New Market	1977	current	
SR 212	0.87	1.40	Fredericksburg	east of Fredericksburg	2004	current	
SR 212	—	—	—	—	1933	1948	
SR 212	—	—	—	—	1975	1979	
SR 212	—	—	—	—	1985	2004	
SR 213	1.89	3.04	Manassas Park		c. 1975	current	
SR 213	—	—	—	—	1933	1943	
SR 214	2.48	3.99	Lerty	east of Stratford	1933	current	
SR 215	9.26	14.90	east of Warrenton	west of Manassas	1961	current	
SR 215	—	—	—	—	1933	1944	
SR 216	3.61	5.81	north of Gloucester Point	Achilles	1933	current	
SR 217	2.20	3.54	Southwestern Virginia Mental Health Institute		1954	current	
SR 217	—	—	—	—	1933	1942	
SR 218	30.00	48.28	Falmouth	west of Colonial Beach	1933	current	
SR 219	—	—	—	—	1933	1937	
SR 220	—	—	—	—	1933	c. 1935	
SR 222	4.17	6.71	south of Weems	north of Irvington	1933	current	
SR 223	2.07	3.33	Hudgins	Gwynn's Island	1933	current	
SR 224	3.32	5.34	Tennessee	east of Weber City	1991	current	
SR 224	—	—	—	—	1933	1951	
SR 224	—	—	—	—	—	1989	
SR 225	5.40	8.69	Virginia Beach		1964	current	
SR 225	—	—	—	—	1933	1956	
SR 226	3.38	5.44	west of Petersburg		1965	current	
SR 226	—	—	—	—	1933	1942	
SR 226	—	—	—	—	1942	1943	
SR 227	2.98	4.80	east of Saluda	Urbanna	1933	current	
SR 228	4.53	7.29	Herndon	north of Herndon	1966	current	
SR 228	—	—	—	—	1933	1951	
SR 229	14.66	23.59	Culpeper	west of Warrenton	1947	current	
SR 229	—	—	—	—	1933	c. 1935	
SR 229	—	—	—	—	1935	1942	
SR 230	20.58	33.12	Stanardsville	north of Madison Mills	1933	current	
SR 231	49.82	80.18	south of Cismont	south of Sperryville	1933	current	
SR 232	4.33	6.97	Radford		1968	current	
SR 232	—	—	—	—	1933	1943	
SR 233	0.36	0.58	Arlington		1964	current	
SR 233	—	—	—	—	1933	1949	
SR 234	33.92	54.59	Dumfries	near Woolsey	1933	current	
SR 235	5.05	8.13	south of Alexandria		1933	current	
SR 236	15.63	25.15	Fairfax	Alexandria	1935	current	
SR 236	—	—	—	—	1933	1935	
SR 237	13.07	21.03	Fairfax	Arlington County	1933	current	
SR 238	7.75	12.47	Lee Hall	Yorktown	1940	current	
SR 238	—	—	—	—	1933	1940	
SR 239	4.46	7.18	Portsmouth		1968	current	
SR 239	—	—	—	—	1933	1941	
SR 239	—	—	—	—	1942	1944	
SR 240	4.51	7.26	near Crozet		1942	current	
SR 240	—	—	—	—	1933	1942	
SR 241	1.88	3.03	south of Alexandria	Alexandria	1933	current	
SR 242	3.58	5.76	Gunston Hall		1950	current	
SR 242	—	—	—	—	1933	1948	
SR 243	1.70	2.74	south of Vienna	Vienna	1960	current	
SR 243	—	—	—	—	1933	1943	
SR 244	8.25	13.28	Annandale	Arlington	1933	current	
SR 245	3.27	5.26	north of Warrenton	The Plains	1945	current	
SR 245	—	—	—	—	1933	1940	
SR 245	—	—	—	—	1940	1942	
SR 245	—	—	—	—	1942	1944	
SR 246	0.76	1.22	Chesapeake		1942	current	
SR 246	—	—	—	—	1933	1942	
SR 247	5.31	8.55	Norfolk		1959	current	
SR 247	—	—	—	—	1933	1943	
SR 248	—	—	—	—	1933	1943	
SR 248	—	—	—	—	1943	1944	
SR 248	—	—	—	—	1980	—	
SR 249	18.43	29.66	northeast of Bottoms Bridge	Angelview Church	1970	current	
SR 249	—	—	—	—	1933	1952	
SR 250	—	—	—	—	1933	1935	
SR 251	9.95	16.01	near Collierstown	Lexington	1933	current	
SR 252	29.06	46.77	east of Rockbridge Baths	Staunton	1933	current	
SR 253	12.18	19.60	Harrisonburg	near Port Republic	2005	current	
SR 253	—	—	—	—	1933	1944	
SR 253	—	—	Occoquan	Woodbridge	1967	1998	
SR 254	25.01	40.25	Christian	Waynesboro	1933	current	
SR 255	3.84	6.18	south of Millwood	Briggs	1933	current	
SR 256	6.78	10.91	south of Burketown	Grottoes	1933	current	
SR 257	18.04	29.03	near West Virginia	east of Mount Crawford	1933	current	
SR 258	—	—	—	—	1933	1940	
SR 258	—	—	—	—	1940	1945	
SR 259	26.80	43.13	Mauzy; West Virginia	West Virginia west of Gore	1933	current	
SR 260	—	—	—	—	1933	1947	
SR 260	—	—	—	—	1952	1977	
SR 260	—	—	—	—	1987	2003	
SR 261	2.21	3.56	Staunton		c. 1981	current	
SR 261	—	—	—	—	1933	1940	
SR 261	—	—	—	—	1940	1951	
SR 262	13.70	22.05	south of Staunton	east of Staunton	c. 1975	current	
SR 262	—	—	—	—	1933	1947	
SR 263	12.83	20.65	west of Orkney Springs	Mount Jackson	1933	current	
SR 264	—	—	—	—	1933	1953	
SR 265	—	—	—	—	1933	1943	
SR 265	—	—	—	—	1969	1970	
SR 265	—	—	—	—	1973	1996	
SR 266	—	—	—	—	1933	1952	
SR 267	28.68	46.16	Leesburg	west of Arlington	1982	current	
SR 267	—	—	—	—	1933	1951	
SR 268	—	—	—	—	1933	1951	
SR 269	6.80	10.94	east of Clifton Forge	Longdale Furnace	1984	current	
SR 269	—	—	—	—	1933	1953	
SR 270	0.26	0.42	Saint Paul		1986	current	
SR 270	—	—	—	—	1933	1948	
SR 271	7.34	11.81	Short Pump	Rockville	1940	current	
SR 271	—	—	—	—	1933	1940	
SR 272	1.24	2.00	west of Holland		c. 1989	current	
SR 272	—	—	—	—	1933	1947	
SR 273	5.33	8.58	Barhamsville	Eltham	1986	current	
SR 273	—	—	—	—	1933	1947	
SR 274	7.36	11.84	east of Independence	south of Fries	c. 1981	current	
SR 274	—	—	—	—	1933	1956	
SR 275	—	—	—	—	1933	1940	
SR 275	—	—	—	—	—	1954	
SR 275	—	—	—	—	—	2006	
SR 276	9.43	15.18	Weyers Cave	east of Harrisonburg	1943	current	
SR 276	—	—	—	—	1933	1943	
SR 277	4.72	7.60	Stephens City	Double Toll Gate	1933	current	
SR 278	1.64	2.64	Langley Air Force Base		1942	current	
SR 278	—	—	—	—	1933	c. 1940	
SR 278	—	—	—	—	1940	1940	
SR 279	5.55	8.93	Virginia Beach		c. 1981	current	
SR 279	—	—	—	—	1933	1943	
SR 280	5.0	8.0	Harrisonburg		2012	current	
SR 280	—	—	—	—	1933	1944	
SR 280	—	—	—	—	1978	1982	
SR 281	1.60	2.57	Richmond		2013	current	
SR 281	—	—	—	—	1933	1945	
SR 282	—	—	—	—	1933	1943	
SR 283	0.36	0.58	Norton		1991	current	
SR 283	—	—	—	—	1933	1943	
SR 284	—	—	—	—	1933	1934	
SR 284	—	—	—	—	—	1946	
SR 285	1.85	2.98	South of Fishersville	Fishersville	c. 1998	current	
SR 285	—	—	—	—	1933	1943	
SR 286	31.8	51.2	Fort Belvoir	Herndon	2012	current	
SR 286	—	—	—	—	1933	1942	
SR 287	12.71	20.45	Purcellville	Maryland	1944	current	
SR 287	—	—	—	—	1933	1934	
SR 287	—	—	—	—	—	1944	
SR 288	31.77	51.13	south of Richmond	west of Richmond	c. 1988	current	
SR 288	—	—	—	—	1933	1947	
SR 289	3.08	4.96	West Springfield	Franconia	2012	current	
SR 289	—	—	—	—	1934	1942	
SR 290	0.61	0.98	Dayton		1934	current	
SR 291	—	—	—	—	1935	1990	
SR 292	0.39	0.63	west of Mount Jackson	Mount Jackson	1986	current	
SR 292	—	—	—	—	c. 1935	1951	
SR 293	7.05	11.35	Danville		1996	current	
SR 293	—	—	—	—	c. 1935	1944	
SR 294	16.07	25.86	Woodbridge	Lake Jackson	2012	current	
SR 294	—	—	—	—	1935	1942	
SR 295	—	—	—	—	1935	1940	
SR 295	—	—	—	—	1940	1962	
SR 296	0.39	0.63	West Point		1935	current	
SR 297	—	—	—	—	1935	1942	
SR 297	—	—	—	—	1942	1970	
SR 298	0.75	1.21	West Point		1935	current	
SR 299	0.79	1.27	south of Culpeper		1999	current	
SR 299	—	—	—	—	1935	c. 1940	
SR 299	—	—	—	—	1941	1951	
SR 300	0.64	1.03	Powhatan	north of Powhatan	1935	current	
SR 301	—	—	—	—	1940	1941	
SR 302	9.28	14.93	University of Virginia		1936	current	
SR 303	2.93	4.72	Virginia Military Institute		1936	current	
SR 304	0.71	1.14	South Boston		1936	current	
SR 305	1.79	2.88	New Market Battlefield State Historical Park		1968	current	
SR 305	—	—	—	—	1936	1940	
SR 305	—	—	—	—	1941	1960	
SR 306	0.88	1.42	Newport News		1941	current	
SR 306	—	—	—	—	1936	1941	
SR 307	9.32	15.00	Rice	west of Jetersville	1936	current	
SR 308	3.65	5.87	Southampton Correctional Center		1938	current	
SR 309	5.33	8.58	McLean	Arlington	1937	current	
SR 310	0.73	1.17	James River Correctional Center		1991	current	
SR 310	—	—	—	—	1932	1990	
SR 311	41.90	67.43	Salem; West Virginia	West Virginia; West Virginia	—	—	
SR 312	1.11	1.79	Newport News		c. 1955	current	
SR 312	—	—	—	—	1938	1951	
SR 313	2.08	3.35	Beaumont Learning Center		c. 1932	current	
SR 314	10.04	16.16	Virginia Polytechnic Institute and State University		c. 1932	current	
SR 315	0.9	1.4	Virginia Museum of Fine Arts and R. E. Lee Memorial Park		1946	current	
SR 315	—	—	—	—	1938	1943	
SR 316	9.49	15.27	Tasley	Hallwood	1938	current	
SR 317	—	—	Staunton		2010	2018	
SR 317	—	—	—	—	1932	2002	
SR 318	0.32	0.51	Capitol Square		1932	current	
SR 319	5.03	8.10	Central State Hospital		c. 1942	current	
SR 320	1.75	2.82	Catawba Hospital		1940	current	
SR 321	5.23	8.42	College of William and Mary		c. 1938	current	
SR 322	3.95	6.36	Eastern State Hospital		1932	current	
SR 323	2.1	3.4	Piedmont Geriatric Hospital		1932	current	
SR 324	1.14	1.83	Bon Air Learning Center		1932	current	
SR 325	0.95	1.53	Barrett Learning Center		1932	current	
SR 326	1.34	2.16	Hanover Learning Center		1932	current	
SR 327	3.22	5.18	Virginia State University		1932	current	
SR 328	0.26	0.42	Longwood University		1958	current	
SR 328	—	—	—	—	c. 1935	1939	
SR 329	1.73	2.78	Virginia Correctional Center for Women		1932	current	
SR 330	0.34	0.55	Keen Mountain Correctional Center		c. 1990	current	
SR 330	—	—	—	—	1932	1980	
SR 331	2.99	4.81	James Madison University		1932	current	
SR 332	0.14	0.23	Hampton Roads Agricultural Experimental Station		1932	current	
SR 333	0.26	0.42	Staunton Correctional Center		1932	current	
SR 334	2.08	3.35	Lynchburg Training School and Hospital		1932	2020	
SR 335	0.18	0.29	Eastern Shore Experimental Station		1959	current	
SR 335	—	—	—	—	1938	1949	
SR 336	0.35	0.56	State Police Headquarters, Wythe County		1960	current	
SR 336	—	—	—	—	1938	—	
SR 337	35.83	57.66	Suffolk	Norfolk	1938	current	
SR 338	1.08	1.74	Falls Church		1938	current	
SR 339	1.18	1.90	State Police and Radio Headquarters, Chesterfield County		1939	current	
SR 340	—	—	—	—	1933	1936	
SR 341	0.20	0.32	State Police and Radio Station, Appomattox County		1940	current	
SR 342	0.16	0.26	State Police and Radio Station, Culpeper County		1940	current	
SR 343	6.99	11.25	First Landing State Park		1940	current	
SR 344	12.28	19.76	Staunton River State Park		1940	current	
SR 345	0.49	0.79	Richard Bland College		1941	current	
SR 345	—	—	—	—	1941	1944	
SR 346	3.86	6.21	Fairy Stone State Park		1940	current	
SR 347	2.98	4.80	Westmoreland State Park		1940	current	
SR 348	2.98	4.80	Hungry Mother State Park		1940	current	
SR 349	0.12	0.19	Halifax		c. 1942	current	
SR 350	0.78	1.26	Tidewater Community College, Virginia Beach Campus		1971	current	
SR 350	—	—	—	—	c. 1955	—	
SR 351	8.81	14.18	Newport News	Hampton	c. 1945	current	
SR 351	—	—	—	—	1942	1944	
SR 352	2.40	3.86	north of Pennington Gap	Saint Charles	1942	current	
SR 353	0.38	0.61	Virginia Commonwealth University Medical College Campus		1942	current	
SR 354	13.53	21.77	Corrotoman River	north of Litwalton	1942	current	
SR 355	1	1.6	Lord Fairfax Community College		c. 2001	current	
SR 355	—	—	—	—	1947	1983	
SR 356	1.43	2.30	northwest of Richmond		c. 1945	current	
SR 357	—	—	—	—	1949	1953	
SR 357	—	—	—	—	1965	2019	
SR 358	1.12	1.80	Wilson Workforce & Rehabilitation Center		1949	current	
SR 359	0.34	0.55	southwest of Williamsburg		1959	current	
SR 360	41.77	67.22	Danville	east of South Boston	1982	current	
SR 361	2.75	4.43	Red Onion State Prison		1997	current	
SR 361	—	—	—	—	1966	1980	
SR 362	8.87	14.27	Grayson Highlands State Park		c. 1976	current	
SR 363	0.14	0.23	Blue Ridge Community College		c. 1967	current	
SR 364	6.02	9.69	Occoneechee State Park		1968	current	
SR 365	0.57	0.92	Wytheville Community College		1965	current	
SR 366	0.67	1.08	Brightpoint Community College		1969	current	
SR 367	4.03	6.49	Tidewater Community College, Portsmouth Campus		1969	current	
SR 368	1.24	2.00	Central Virginia Community College		1968	current	
SR 369	1.37	2.20	Southwest Virginia Community College		1968	current	
SR 370	0.84	1.35	Natural Tunnel State Park		1970	current	
SR 371	0.94	1.51	Patrick & Henry Community College		1971	current	
SR 372	0.73	1.17	Virginia Highlands Community College		1970	2005	
SR 372	0.5	0.80	Pocahontas Correctional Center		2023	current	
SR 373	0.93	1.50	New River Community College		1971	current	
SR 374	0.14	0.23	Rappahannock Community College, South Campus		1971	current	
SR 375	0.33	0.53	Germanna Community College		1970	current	
SR 376	1.13	1.82	Northern Virginia Community College, Annandale Campus		1971	current	
SR 377	0.58	0.93	Lord Fairfax Community College		1971	current	
SR 378	0.42	0.68	Southside Virginia Community College, Christiana Campus		1970	current	
SR 379	0.22	0.35	Paul D. Camp Community College		c. 1972	current	
SR 380	0.8	1.3	Elko Tract		—	—	
SR 381	1.21	1.95	Bristol		1960	current	
SR 382	1.24	2.00	University of Virginia's College at Wise		1964	current	
SR 383	0.31	0.50	George Mason University		1964	current	
SR 384	0.56	0.90	Dabney S. Lancaster Community College		1965	current	
SR 385	0.34	0.55	Southside Virginia Community College, John H. Daniel Campus		c. 1970	current	
SR 386	—	—	—	—	—	2019	
SR 387	0.99	1.59	Mountain Empire Community College		1974	current	
SR 388	0.64	1.03	Piedmont Virginia Community College		1974	current	
SR 389	0.18	0.29	Eastern Shore Community College, Melfa Campus		c. 1979	current	
SR 390	0.14	0.23	Tidewater Research and Continuing Education Center		1978	current	
SR 391	0.17	0.27	Northern Virginia Community College, Loudoun Campus		c. 1976	current	
SR 392	1.05	1.69	Southwestern Virginia Training Center		c. 1976	2022	
SR 393	0.63	1.01	Northern Virginia Community College, Manassas Campus		c. 1976	current	
SR 394	0.36	0.58	Northern Virginia Community College, Woodbridge Campus		c. 1977	current	
SR 396	0.85	1.37	J. Sargeant Reynolds Community College, Western Campus		c. 1978	current	
SR 397	1	1.6	Greensville Correctional Center		1990	current	
SR 398	0.40	0.64	Danville Community College		c. 1967	current	
SR 399	0.11	0.18	Science Museum of Virginia		c. 1980	current	
SR 400	.79	1.27	Alexandria		c. 1982	current	
SR 401	2.61	4.20	Alexandria		c. 1982	current	
SR 401	—	—	—	—	1957	—	
SR 402	1.65	2.66	Alexandria		c. 1982	current	
SR 402	—	—	—	—	1957	—	
SR 403	1.02	1.64	Norfolk		c. 1982	current	
SR 403	—	—	—	—	1957	—	
SR 404	0.53	0.85	Norfolk		c. 1982	current	
SR 404	—	—	—	—	1957	—	
SR 405	0.64	1.03	Norfolk		c. 1982	current	
SR 405	—	—	—	—	1957	—	
SR 406	1.61	2.59	Norfolk		c. 1982	current	
SR 406	—	—	—	—	1957	—	
SR 407	2.32	3.73	Norfolk	Chesapeake	c. 1982	current	
SR 407	—	—	—	—	1957	—	
SR 408	—	—	—	—	1957	—	
SR 408	—	—	—	—	c. 1985	2001	
SR 409	0.20	0.32	Providence Forge		2010	current	
SR 409	—	—	—	—	1957	—	
SR 409	—	—	—	—	c. 1985	2001	
SR 410	—	—	—	—	1957	—	
SR 410	—	—	—	—	c. 1985	2001	
SR 410	—	—	Powhatan State Park	—	2023	current	
SR 411	—	—	—	—	1957	—	
SR 411	—	—	—	—	c. 1985	2001	
SR 412	1.35	2.17	Blacksburg		c. 1982	current	
SR 412	—	—	—	—	1957	—	
SR 413	1.29	2.08	Danville		c. 1982	current	
SR 413	—	—	—	—	1957	—	
SR 414	—	—	—	—	c. 1985	2001	
SR 415	2.59	4.17	Hampton		c. 1982	current	
SR 416	—	—	—	—	c. 1985	1988	
SR 417	—	—	—	—	c. 1985	1988	
SR 418	—	—	Richmond		1981	1988	Monument Avenue
SR 419	10.54	16.96	Roanoke	Hanging Rock	1964	current	
SR 419	—	—	—	—	1964	1964	
SR 420	2.75	4.43	Alexandria		c. 1985	current	
SR 457	5.80	9.33	Martinsville	east of Martinsville	1992	current	
SR 501	59.17	95.22	West Virginia	East Lexington	1933	1940	
SR 522	—	—	—	—	1940	c. 1942	
SR 598	4.16	6.69	Rocky Gap	West Virginia	c. 1980	current	
SR 599	—	—	temporary number sometimes assigned to construction projects		—	—	
SR 785	—	—	—	—	—	—	
SR 895	8.52	13.71	south of Richmond	southeast of Richmond	c. 1995	current	
SR 90003	23.0	37.0	Colonial Parkway		2003	current	unsigned
SR 90004	13.65	21.97	Dulles Airport Access Road		2003	current	unsigned
SR 90005	24.9	40.1	George Washington Memorial Parkway		2003	current	unsigned
Former

== Special routes ==
Number	Length (mi)	Length (km)	Southern or western terminus	Northern or eastern terminus	Cities	Formed	Removed	Notes
SR 3 Bus.	—	—	Fredericksburg		Serves Fredericksburg	—	—	
SR 3 Bus.	—	—	Warsaw		Serves Warsaw	—	—	
SR 7 Bus.	—	—	Berryville		Serves Berryville	—	—	
SR 7 Bus.	—	—	Leesburg		Serves Leesburg	—	—	
SR 7 Bus.	—	—	Purcellville		Serves Purcellville	—	—	
SR 10 Bus.	—	—	Smithfield		Serves Smithfield	—	—	
SR 16 Alt.	—	—	Tazewell		Serves Tazewell	1953	current	
SR 20 Bus.	—	—	Orange		Serves Orange	—	—	
SR 39 Alt.	—	—	Goshen		Serves Goshen	1940	current	
SR 40 Bus.	—	—	Stony Creek		Serves Stony Creek	—	—	
SR 40 Truck	—	—	Victoria		Serves Victoria	—	—	
SR 42 Bus.	—	—	Dayton		Serves Dayton	—	—	
SR 46 Truck	—	—	Lawrenceville		Serves Lawrenceville	—	—	
SR 49 Truck	—	—	Victoria		Serves Victoria	—	—	
SR 57 Alt.	—	—	West of Bassett	West of Martinsville		c. 1958	current	
SR 91 Bus.	—	—	Glade Spring		Serves Glade Spring	—	—	
SR 132Y	—	—	Williamsburg		Serves Williamsburg	—	—	
SR 141Y	—	—	Carson	south of Petersburg		1930	1943	now SR 604
SR 156 Bus.	—	—	Hopewell		Serves Hopewell	—	—	
SR 168 Bus.	—	—	Chesapeake		Serves Chesapeake	—	—	
SR 207 Bus.	—	—	Bowling Green		Serves Bowling Green	—	—	
SR 220 Alt.	—	—	Roanoke	Fincastle		1978	current	
SR 234 Bus.	—	—	Manassas		Serves Manassas	—	—	
SR 57 Alt.	—	—	West of Bassett	West of Martinsville		c. 1958	current	
SR 258 Alt.	—	—	Smithfield		Serves Smithfield	—	—	
SR 259 Alt.	—	—	Broadway		Serves Broadway	—	—	
SR 337 Alt.	—	—	Portsmouth		Serves Portsmouth	1968	current	
SR 337 Alt.	—	—	Norfolk		Serves Norfolk	—	—	

== See also ==
- List of primary state highways in Virginia shorter than one mile
- List of primary state highways serving Virginia state institutions
