= Virginia State Route 159 =

State highway in Alleghany County, Virginia, US

State Route 159
- Dunlap Creek Road

Route information
- Maintained by VDOT
- Length: 11.33 mi (18.23 km)
- Existed: 1947–present
- Tourist routes: Virginia Byway

Major junctions
- West end: SR 311 at Crows
- East end: I-64 / US 60 at Callaghan

Location
- Country: United States
- State: Virginia
- Counties: Alleghany

Highway system
- Virginia Routes; Interstate; US; Primary; Secondary; Byways; History; HOT lanes
← SR 158	→ SR 160

State Route 159 (SR 159) is a primary state highway in the U.S. state of Virginia. Known as Dunlap Creek Road, the state highway runs 11.33 miles (18.23 km) from SR 311 at Crows north to Interstate 64 (I-64) and U.S. Route 60 (US 60) at Callaghan. SR 159 forms part of the old alignment of US 60 in western Alleghany County.

All of SR 159 is a Virginia Byway.

== Route description ==
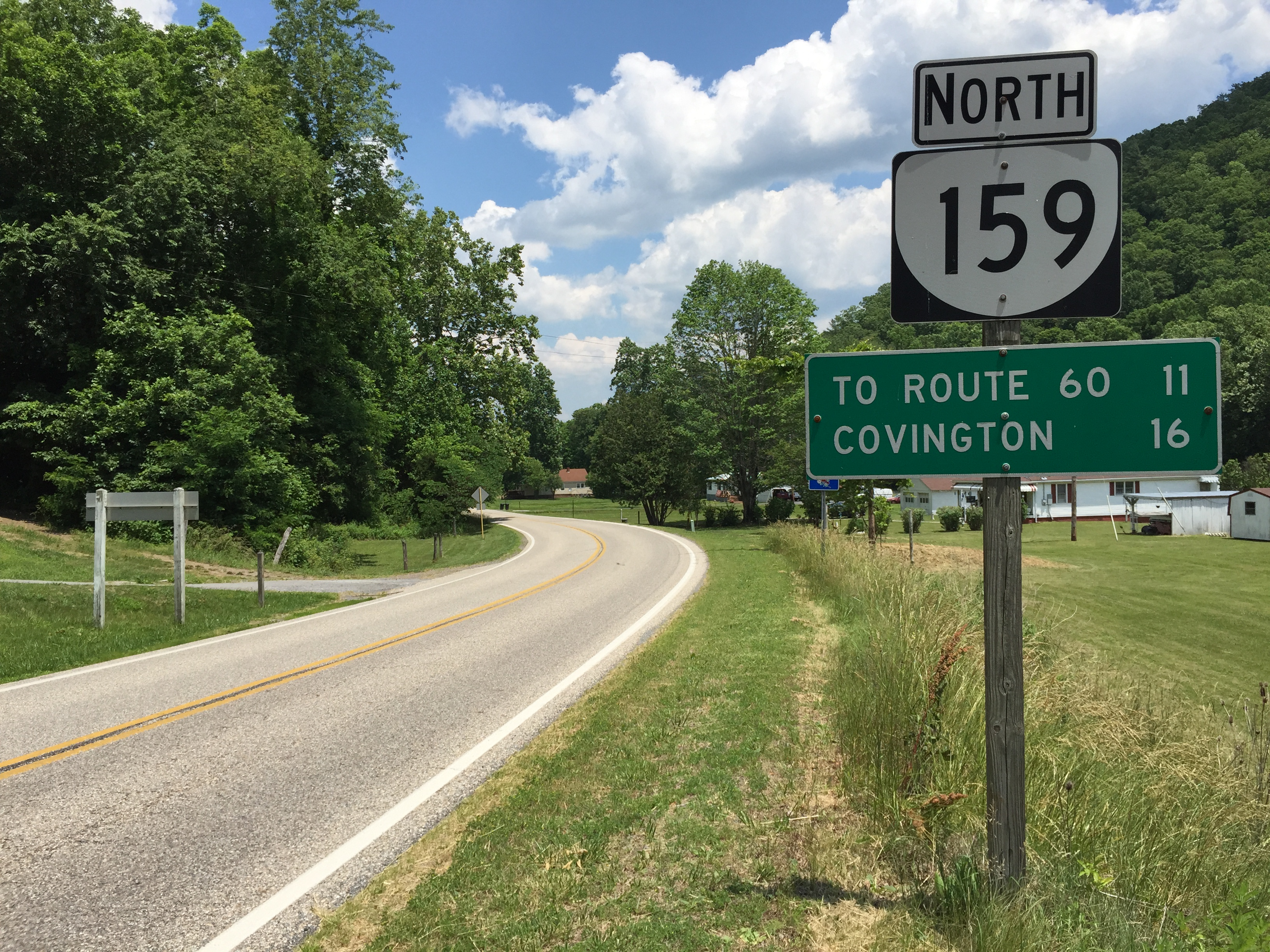
View north at the south end of SR 159 at SR 311 in Crows

SR 159 begins at a wye intersection with SR 311 (Kanawha Trail) in the hamlet of Crows in southwestern Alleghany County. The state highway heads northeast and parallels Dunlap Creek through its valley between Peters Mountain to the east and Brushy Mountain to the west. SR 159 passes through the hamlets of Hematite and Moss Run within the valley. As the state highway approaches Callaghan, it veers away from the creek and passes under CSX's Alleghany Subdivision. SR 159 crosses Ogle Creek just before intersecting SR 600 (Midland Trail), the old alignment of US 60. The state highway crosses Dunlap Creek once more before terminating within its partial diamond interchange with I-64 and US 60, which runs concurrently with I-64 west from the interchange toward West Virginia. The roadway continues east as US 60 (Midland Trail) toward Covington.

== Major intersections ==
The entire route is in Alleghany County.

Location	mi	km	Destinations	Notes
Crows	0.00	0.00	SR 311 (Kanawha Trail) – Salem, White Sulphur Springs	Western terminus
Callaghan			SR 600 (Midland Trail)	former US 60 west
Callaghan	11.33	18.23	I-64 / US 60 (Midland Trail) – White Sulphur Springs, WV, Lexington	Exit 10 (I-64); eastern terminus
1.000 mi = 1.609 km; 1.000 km = 0.621 mi
