= Virginia State Route 18 =

State highway in Virginia, United States

State Route 18

Route information
- Maintained by VDOT
- Length: 25.86 mi (41.62 km)
- Existed: July 1, 1933–present

Major junctions
- South end: SR 311 in Paint Bank
- North end: US 60 / US 220 in Covington

Location
- Country: United States
- State: Virginia
- Counties: Craig, Alleghany, City of Covington

Highway system
- Virginia Routes; Interstate; US; Primary; Secondary; Byways; History; HOT lanes
← US 17	→ US 19

State Route 18 (SR 18) is a primary state highway in the U.S. state of Virginia. Known for most of its length as Potts Creek Road, the state highway runs 25.86 miles (41.62 km) from SR 311 in Paint Bank north to U.S. Route 60 (US 60) and US 220 in Covington.

== Route description ==
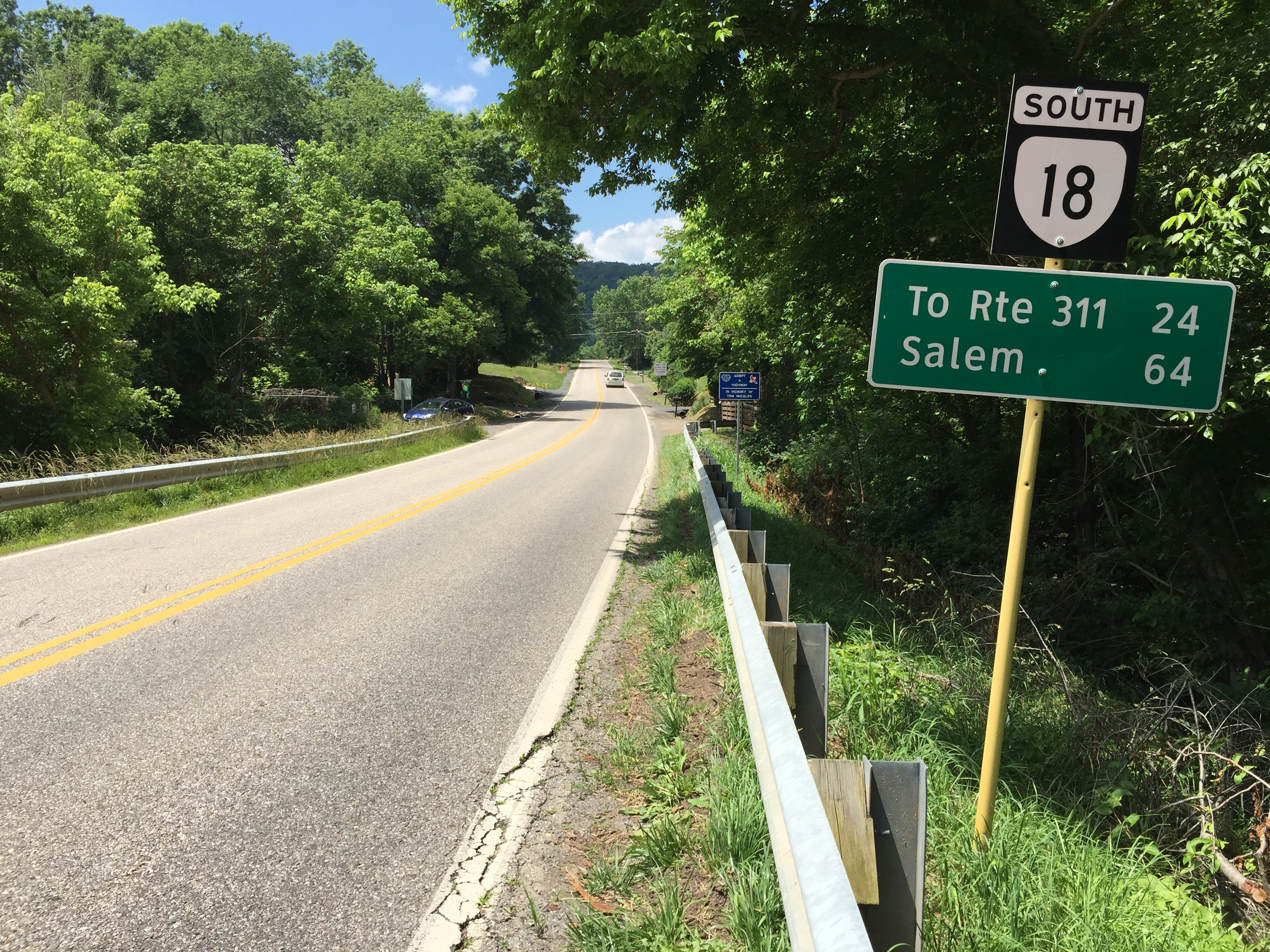
View south along SR 18 just south of Covington

SR 18 begins at an intersection with SR 311 (Paint Bank Road) in the community of Paint Bank in Craig County. The state highway heads northeast as Potts Creek Road through the valley of Potts Creek, which was formerly known as Carpenter Creek. The Potts Creek valley is bookended by Potts Mountain to the east and Peters Mountain to the west; the latter mountain forms part of the Virginia – West Virginia state line. SR 18 enters Alleghany County and passes through the hamlets of Potts Creek, Jordan Mines, and Boiling Spring. At the state highway's final crossing of Potts Creek just south of its confluence with the Jackson River, the highway enters the city of Covington and becomes Indian Valley Road. At its intersection with Pitzer Ridge Road at the former site of Fort Carpenter, SR 18 becomes Carpenter Drive and crosses the Jackson River. The state highway crosses over CSX's Alleghany Subdivision. SR 18 parallels the railroad tracks north under Interstate 64 to its northern terminus at Madison Street, which carries US 60 and US 220, south of downtown Covington.

== Major intersections ==
County	Location	mi	km	Destinations	Notes
Craig	Paint Bank	0.00	0.00	SR 311 (Paint Bank Road) – Salem, Crows, Paint Bank State Fish Hatchery	Southern terminus
Alleghany	No major junctions				
City of Covington		25.86	41.62	US 60 / US 220 (Madison Street) to I-64	Northern terminus
1.000 mi = 1.609 km; 1.000 km = 0.621 mi

< SR 394	Spurs of SR 39; 1923–1928	SR 396 >
none	District 8 State Routes; 1928–1933	SR 801 >
