= Route 311 (Virginia–West Virginia) =

Adjoining state highways in Virginia and West Virginia, US

Virginia State Route 311 and West Virginia Route 311

Route information
- Maintained by VDOT, WVDOH, and City of Salem, VA
- Length: 58.7 mi (94.5 km)
- Tourist routes: Virginia Byway

Virginia
- Length: 41.90 mi (67.43 km)
- South end: US 11 in Salem
- Major intersections: US 460 in Salem; I-81 in Hanging Rock; SR 419 in Hanging Rock; SR 42 / SR 615 in New Castle; SR 18 in Paint Bank

West Virginia
- Length: 4.0 mi (6.4 km)
- Major intersections: WV 3 in Sweet Springs

Virginia
- Length: 12.49 mi (20.10 km)
- Major intersections: SR 159 in Crows

West Virginia
- Length: 0.3 mi (480 m)
- North end: I-64 / US 60 near White Sulphur Springs

Location
- Country: United States
- State: Virginia
- Counties: City of Salem (VA), Roanoke (VA), Craig (VA), Monroe (WV), Alleghany (VA), Greenbrier (WV)

Highway system
- Virginia Routes; Interstate; US; Primary; Secondary; Byways; History; HOT lanes
- West Virginia State Highway System; Interstate; US; State
← US 311	Virginia	→ SR 312
← WV 310	West Virginia	→ WV 331

Virginia State Route 311 (SR 311) and West Virginia Route 311 (WV 311) are adjoining state highways in the U.S. states of Virginia and West Virginia. The two state highways together run 58.7 miles (94.5 km) from U.S. Route 11 in Salem, Virginia north to Interstate 64 and U.S. Route 60 near White Sulphur Springs, West Virginia. The two Virginia portions of Route 311 are maintained by the Virginia Department of Transportation, with the exception of the city-maintained portion within Salem. The West Virginia segments are maintained by the West Virginia Division of Highways.

SR 311 is a Virginia Byway north of SR 419.

== Route description ==
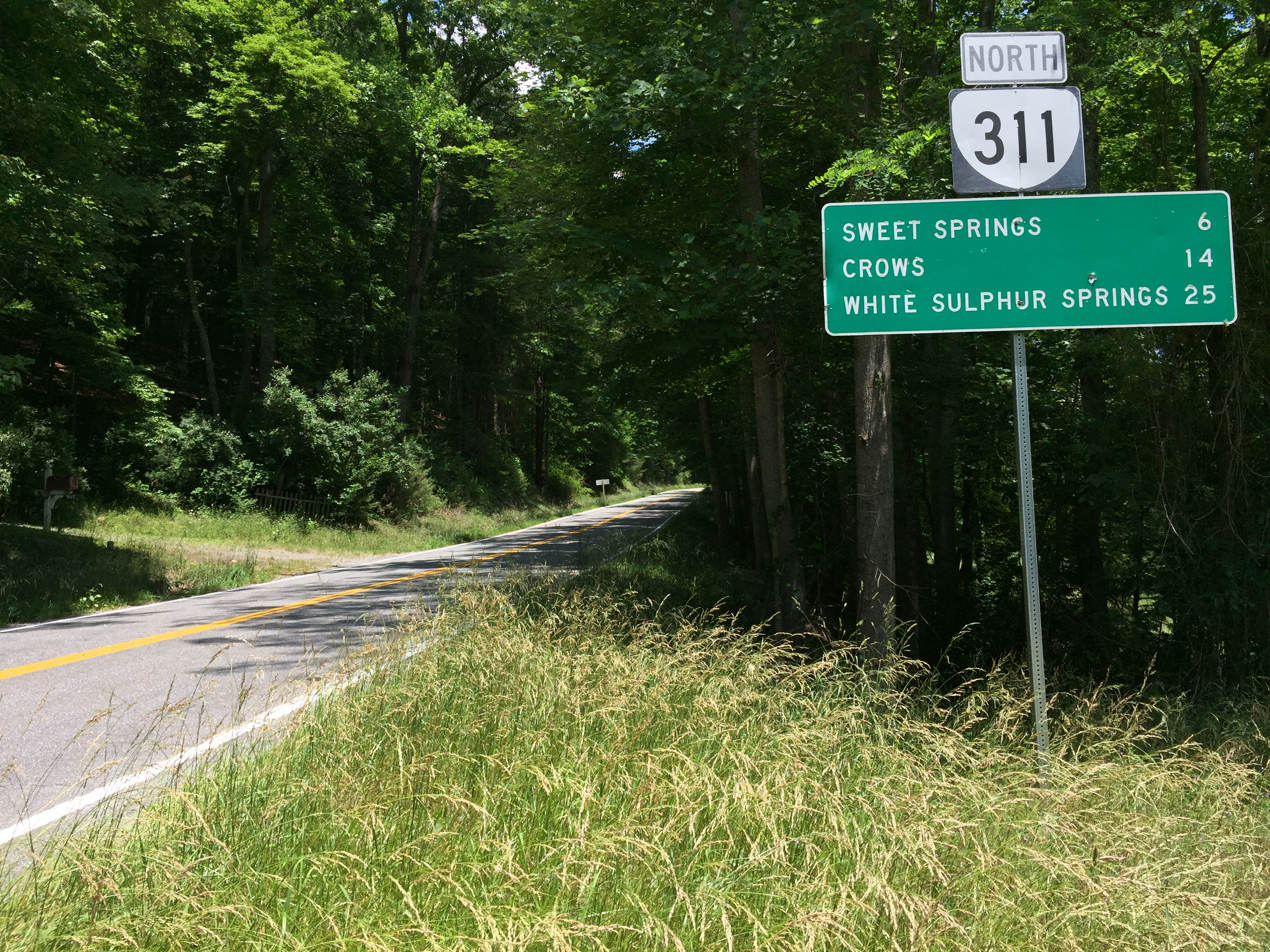
View north along SR 311 at SR 18 in Paint Bank

Route 311 begins at an intersection with US 11 (College Avenue) in the independent city of Salem. The state highway, which is maintained by the city within the city limits, heads north as Thompson Memorial Drive, a four-lane divided boulevard that intersects US 460 (Main Street) and passes to the east of Roanoke College. Route 311 leaves the city limits of Salem at its partial cloverleaf interchange with I-81, entering Roanoke County. North of I-81, the state highway reduces to a two-lane undivided road and curves to the northeast into the community of Hanging Rock, where the highway meets the northern terminus of SR 419 (Electric Road). Route 311 turns left onto Catawba Valley Drive and leaves the Roanoke Valley by following Mason Creek through a gap between Fort Lewis Mountain to the west and Brushy Mountain to the east.

Route 311 heads north into Mason Cove, a narrow valley between Fort Lewis Mountain and Catawba Mountain, before turning northwest and ascending Catawba Mountain, on top of which the highway intersects the Appalachian Trail. The state highway descends into the valley of Catawba Creek and passes through the community of Catawba, where the highway intersects SR 779 (Catawba Creek Road) and SR 785 (Blacksburg Road), which form the main highway along the valley. Route 311 has a short ascent to McAfee Gap, enters Jefferson National Forest, and curves to the north between Cove Mountain to the west and North Mountain to enter Craig County.

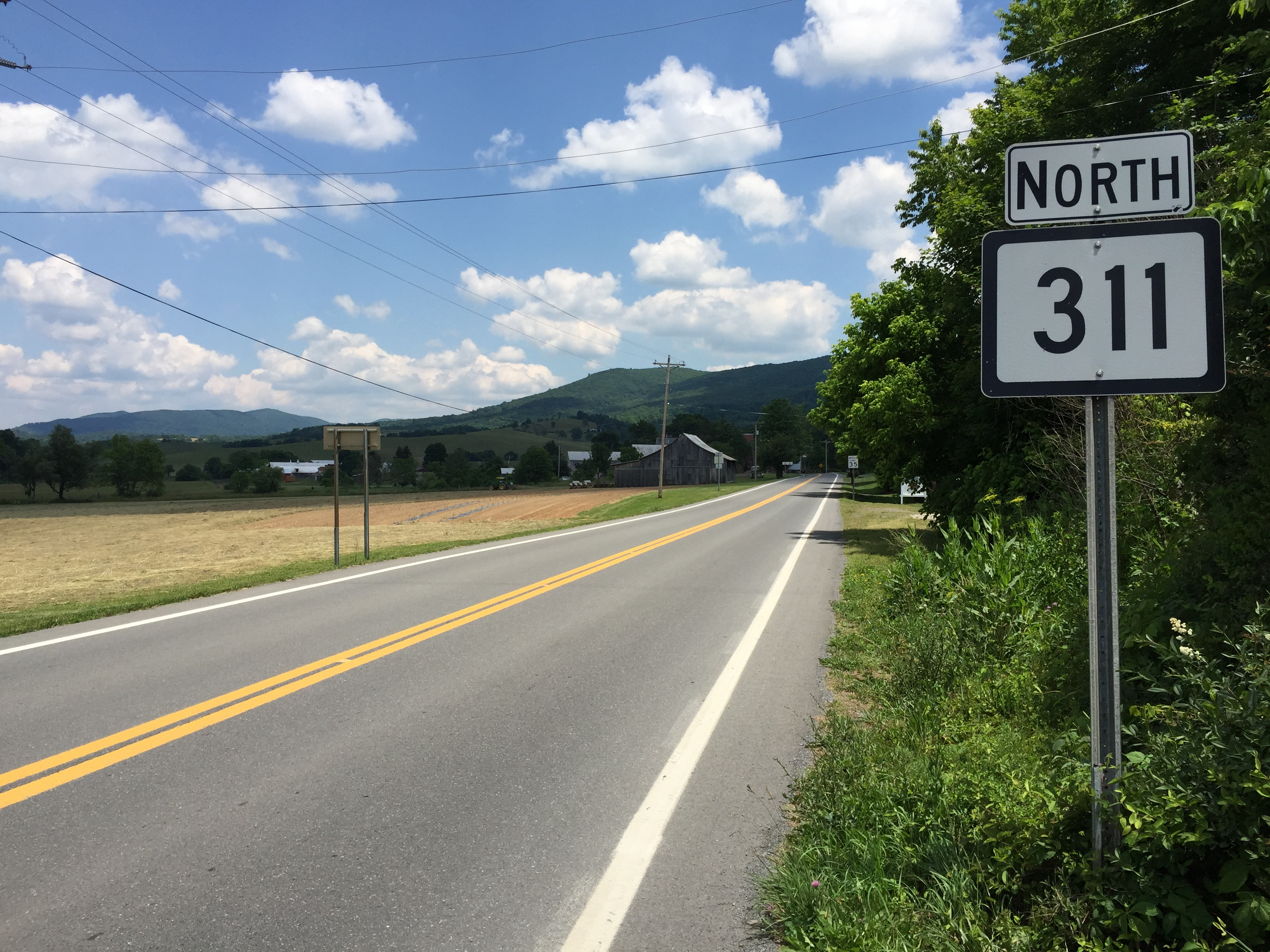
View north along WV 311 at WV 3 in Sweet Springs

Route 311 descends into the valley of Craig Creek, which the state highway follows northeast around the edge of Sinking Creek Mountain to the northwest, passing through the hamlet of Abbott. The state highway follows Craig Creek to the town of New Castle, the county seat of Craig County at the confluence of Johns Creek with Craig Creek. Route 311 meets the eastern terminus of SR 42 (Main Street) before following Johns Creek west out of town. The state highway climbs Peters Hill and descends back to the narrow creek valley before climbing Potts Mountain. Route 311 heads down the mountain and follows Paint Bank Branch through a gap between Little Mountain and Middle Mountain to the community of Paint Bank at the confluence of its namesake branch with Potts Creek. The state highway meets the southern end of SR 18, which follows the creek northeast toward the community of Potts Creek, before ascending Peters Mountain. At the summit of Peters Mountain, Route 311 leaves Jefferson National Forest and enters West Virginia.

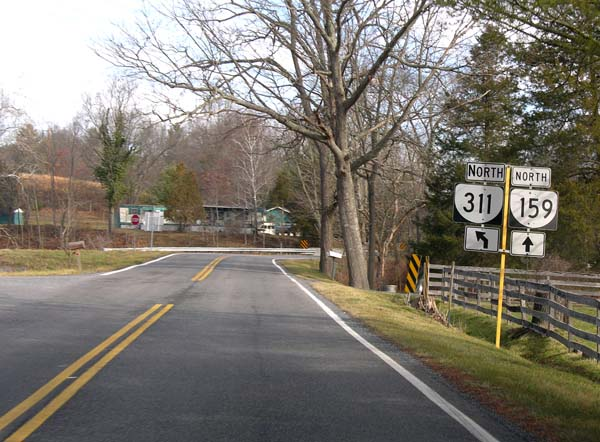
SR 311 at the southern terminus of SR 159 in Crows

Route 311 descends the mountain to the village of Sweet Springs in the northeastern corner of Monroe County, where the state highway meets the eastern terminus of WV 3 (Sweet Springs Valley Road). Route 311 follows the valley northeast back into Virginia, entering Alleghany County and George Washington National Forest. The state highway, now named Kanawha Trail, passes through the communities of Sweet Chalybeate and Earlehurst, then follows the valley of Dunlap Creek between Dameron Mountain to the northwest and Snake Run Ridge to the southeast. At the community of Crows, SR 159 (Dunlap Creek Road) continues northeast through the valley while Route 311 follows Tygers Creek up the mountain to the west. The state highway parallels CSX's Alleghany Subdivision then passes under the railroad tracks at the hamlet of Alleghany. Route 311 follows the west flank of Lewis Mountain to the West Virginia state line, then curves west into Greenbrier County and reaches its northern terminus at a partial interchange with I-64 and US 60 east of White Sulphur Springs. There is no access from westbound I-64 to southbound Route 311 or from northbound Route 311 to eastbound I-64.

== Major intersections ==
State	County	Location	mi (Note: Virginia SR 311 officially has a length of 54.39 miles (87.53 km) in two sections. WV 311 has a length of 4.3 miles (6.9 km) in two sections. In the table below, mileage totals reset at each crossing of the state line.)	km	Destinations	Notes
Virginia	City of Salem		0.00	0.00	US 11 (South College Avenue)	Southern terminus
Virginia	City of Salem		0.17	0.27	US 460 (East Main Street)	
Virginia	Roanoke		1.66	2.67	I-81 – Bristol, Lexington	Exit 140 on I-81
Virginia	Roanoke	Hanging Rock	2.93	4.72	SR 419 south (Electric Road) to I-81 north – Roanoke	
Virginia	Roanoke	Catawba			SR 698 north (Keffer Road) / SR 779 east (Catawba Creek Road) – Catawba Hospital	former SR 114 east
Virginia	Roanoke				SR 785 (Blacksburg Road)	former SR 114 west
Virginia	Craig	New Castle	22.25	35.81	SR 42 west / SR 615 east (Main Street)	
Virginia	Craig				SR 658 (Johns Creek Road) – Craig Springs	former SR 113 west
Virginia	Craig	Paint Bank	38.51	61.98	SR 18 north – Covington	
Peters Mountain			41.90 0.0	67.43 0.0	State line	
West Virginia	Monroe	Sweet Springs	3.1	5.0	WV 3 west – Union, Moncove Lake State Park	
			4.0 0.00	6.4 0.00	State line	
Virginia	Alleghany	Crows	6.62	10.65	SR 159 north (Dunlap Creek Road) – Covington	
			12.49 0.0	20.10 0.0	State line	
West Virginia	Greenbrier		0.3	0.48	I-64 west / US 60 west – White Sulphur Springs	Northern terminus; exit 183 on I-64
1.000 mi = 1.609 km; 1.000 km = 0.621 mi

== Notes ==
< SR 21	Two‑digit State Routes; 1923-1933	SR 23 >
