= Craig County, Virginia =

County in Virginia, United States

- County
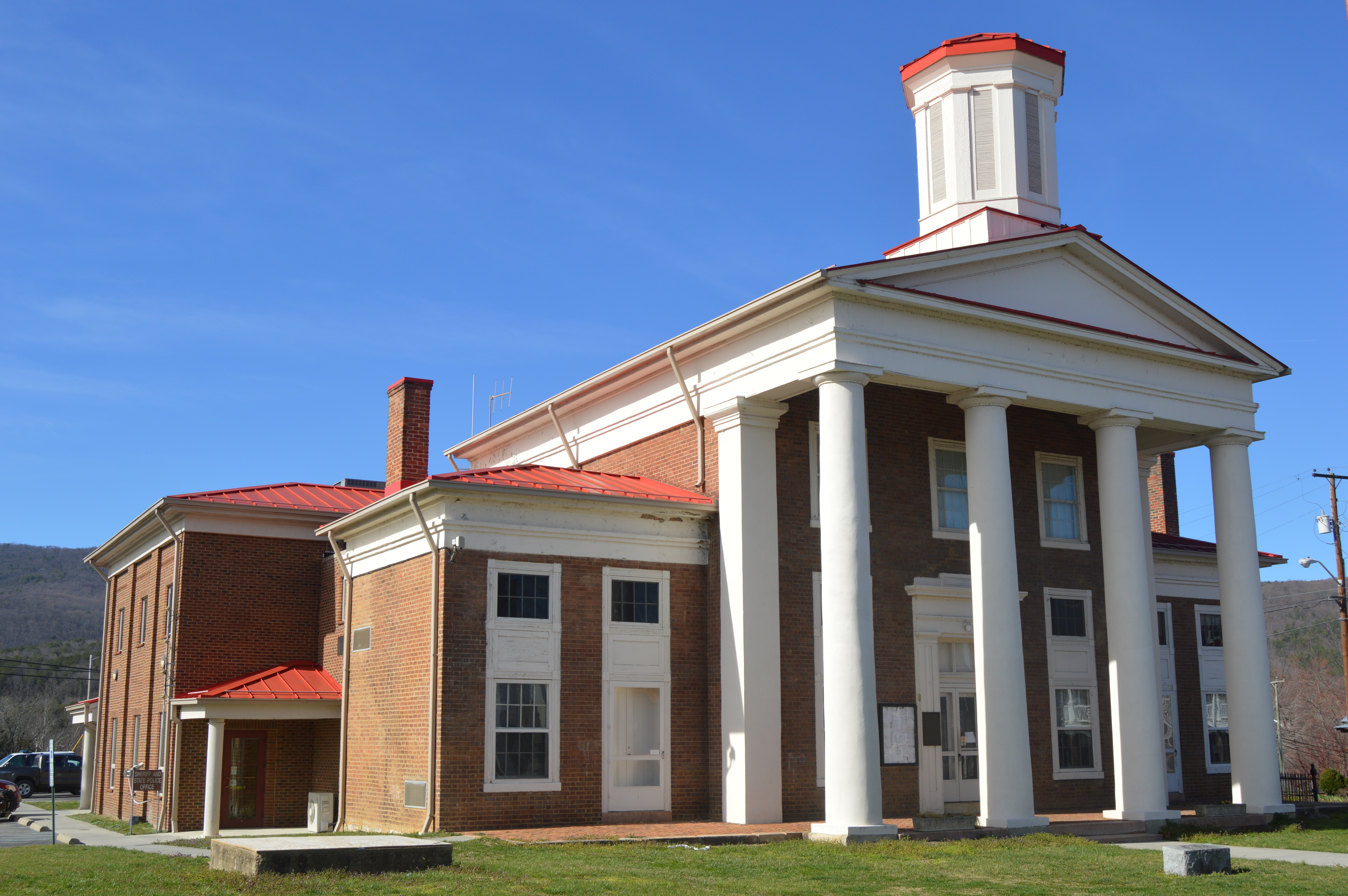
- Craig County Courthouse in New Castle

- Seal Logo

- Location within the U.S. state of Virginia
- Coordinates: 37°29′N 80°13′W
- Country: United States
- State: Virginia
- Founded: 1851
- Named for: Robert Craig
- Seat: New Castle
- Largest town: New Castle

Area
  - Total: 331 sq mi (860 km^{2})
  - Land: 330 sq mi (850 km^{2})
  - Water: 1.1 sq mi (2.8 km^{2}) 0.3%

Population (2020)
  - Total: 4,892
  - Estimate (2025): 4,800 ▼
  - Density: 15/sq mi (5.7/km^{2})
- Time zone: UTC−5 (Eastern)
  - Summer (DST): UTC−4 (EDT)
- Congressional district: 9th
- Website: www.craigcountyva.gov

Craig County, part of the Roanoke metropolitan area, is a rural, mountainous county located on the western border of the Commonwealth of Virginia. Its county seat is New Castle, which is also the only town in the county. As of the 2020 census, the Craig County population was only 4,892, making it one of the least populated counties in Virginia.

Craig County was formed in 1851 from parts of several adjacent counties, and was named in honor of Robert Craig, a longtime congressman from Southwest Virginia. More than half of the county remains federally protected land, forming a major part of the Jefferson National Forest.

== History ==
Nestled in the mountains of Southwest Virginia, Craig County was named for Robert Craig, a 19th-century Virginia congressman. The initial outpost in the area was called "Craig's Camp," and it is claimed that George Washington visited it in 1756 during his travels to the frontier. Formed from parts of Botetourt, Roanoke, Giles, and Monroe (in present-day West Virginia) counties in 1851, Craig was later enlarged with several subsequent additions from neighboring counties.

The secluded, mountainous town of New Castle, the county seat, has one of the commonwealth's antebellum court complexes, including a porticoed courthouse built in 1852. Craig Healing Springs, a collection of well-preserved early-20th-century resort buildings representative of the architecture of Virginia's more modest mountain spas, is located here.

== Geography ==
According to the U.S. Census Bureau, the county has a total area of 330.6 square miles (856.3 km^{2}), of which 329.5 square miles (853.4 km^{2}) is land and 1.1 square miles (2.8 km^{2}) (0.3%) is water. More than 112,000 acres of the county is national forest . Craig County is one of the 423 counties served by the Appalachian Regional Commission, and it is identified as part of "Greater Appalachia" by Colin Woodard in his book American Nations: A History of the Eleven Rival Regional Cultures of North America.

=== Adjacent counties ===
- Alleghany County – north
- Botetourt County – east
- Roanoke County – southeast
- Montgomery County – south
- Giles County – southwest
- Monroe County, West Virginia – west

=== National protected area ===
- Jefferson National Forest (part)

=== Major highways ===
- SR 18
- SR 42
- SR 311

== Demographics ==
Historical population
Census	Pop.	Note	%±
1860	3,553		—
1870	2,942		−17.2%
1880	3,794		29.0%
1890	3,835		1.1%
1900	4,293		11.9%
1910	4,711		9.7%
1920	4,100		−13.0%
1930	3,562		−13.1%
1940	3,769		5.8%
1950	3,452		−8.4%
1960	3,356		−2.8%
1970	3,524		5.0%
1980	3,948		12.0%
1990	4,372		10.7%
2000	5,091		16.4%
2010	5,190		1.9%
2020	4,892		−5.7%
2025 (est.)	4,800	▼	−1.9%
U.S. Decennial Census; 1790–1960 1900–1990; 1990–2000 2010 2020

=== Racial and ethnic composition ===
Craig County, Virginia – Racial and ethnic composition Note: the US Census treats Hispanic/Latino as an ethnic category. This table excludes Latinos from the racial categories and assigns them to a separate category. Hispanics/Latinos may be of any race.
Race / Ethnicity (NH = Non-Hispanic)	Pop 1980	Pop 1990	Pop 2000	Pop 2010	Pop 2020	% 1980	% 1990	% 2000	% 2010	% 2020
White alone (NH)	3,917	4,350	5,023	5,103	4,631	99.21%	99.50%	98.66%	98.32%	94.66%
Black or African American alone (NH)	8	8	9	5	11	0.20%	0.18%	0.18%	0.10%	0.22%
Native American or Alaska Native alone (NH)	0	5	10	6	5	0.00%	0.11%	0.20%	0.12%	0.10%
Asian alone (NH)	0	4	8	8	11	0.00%	0.09%	0.16%	0.15%	0.22%
Native Hawaiian or Pacific Islander alone (NH)	x	x	0	0	3	x	x	0.00%	0.00%	0.06%
Other race alone (NH)	2	0	6	1	12	0.05%	0.00%	0.12%	0.02%	0.25%
Mixed race or Multiracial (NH)	x	x	18	31	166	x	x	0.35%	0.60%	3.39%
Hispanic or Latino (any race)	21	5	17	36	53	0.53%	0.11%	0.33%	0.69%	1.08%
Total	3,948	4,372	5,091	5,190	4,892	100.00%	100.00%	100.00%	100.00%	100.00%

=== 2020 census ===
As of the 2020 census, the county had a population of 4,892. The median age was 47.9 years. 18.8% of residents were under the age of 18 and 23.0% of residents were 65 years of age or older. For every 100 females there were 101.1 males, and for every 100 females age 18 and over there were 98.8 males age 18 and over.

The racial makeup of the county was 95.1% White, 0.3% Black or African American, 0.1% American Indian and Alaska Native, 0.2% Asian, 0.1% Native Hawaiian and Pacific Islander, 0.4% from some other race, and 3.8% from two or more races. Hispanic or Latino residents of any race comprised 1.1% of the population.

0.0% of residents lived in urban areas, while 100.0% lived in rural areas.

There were 2,111 households in the county, of which 25.3% had children under the age of 18 living with them and 22.1% had a female householder with no spouse or partner present. About 28.3% of all households were made up of individuals and 13.6% had someone living alone who was 65 years of age or older.

There were 2,584 housing units, of which 18.3% were vacant. Among occupied housing units, 81.6% were owner-occupied and 18.4% were renter-occupied. The homeowner vacancy rate was 1.4% and the rental vacancy rate was 6.9%.

=== 2000 Census ===
As of the census of 2000, there were 5,091 people, 2,060 households, and 1,507 families residing in the county. The population density was 15 people per square mile (5.8 people/km^{2}). There were 2,554 housing units at an average density of 8 units per square mile (3.1 units/km^{2}). The racial makeup of the county was 98.94% White, 0.20% Black or African American, 0.22% Native American, 0.16% Asian, 0.14% from other races, and 0.35% from two or more races. 0.33% of the population were Hispanic or Latino of any race.

There were 2,060 households, out of which 30.80% had children under the age of 18 living with them, 61.90% were married couples living together, 7.00% had a female householder with no husband present, and 26.80% were non-families. 23.90% of all households were made up of individuals, and 10.50% had someone living alone who was 65 years of age or older. The average household size was 2.45 and the average family size was 2.88.

In the county, the population was spread out, with 23.60% under the age of 18, 6.40% from 18 to 24, 29.70% from 25 to 44, 26.70% from 45 to 64, and 13.60% who were 65 years of age or older. The median age was 40 years. For every 100 females there were 103.40 males. For every 100 females age 18 and over, there were 101.50 males.

The median income for a household in the county was $37,314, and the median income for a family was $41,750. Males had a median income of $26,713 versus $21,337 for females. The per capita income for the county was $17,322. About 6.60% of families and 10.30% of the population were below the poverty line, including 15.90% of those under age 18 and 10.50% of those age 65 or over.

== Government ==
=== Board of Supervisors ===
- Craig City District: Rusty Zimmerman (Vice Chair)
- Craig Creek District: Lindsey Dunne
- New Castle District: Jesse Spence (chair)
- Potts Mountain District: Carl Bailey
- Simmonsville District: Kathi Toelke

=== Constitutional officers ===
- Clerk of the Circuit Court: Sharon P. Oliver (I)
- Commissioner of the Revenue: Elizabeth Huffman (I)
- Commonwealth's Attorney: Matthew Dunne (R)
- Sheriff: Trevor Craddock (R)
- Treasurer: Jackie Parsons (I)

Craig County is represented by Republican Stephen D. "Steve" Newman in the Virginia Senate, Republican Joe McNamara in the Virginia House of Delegates, and Republican H. Morgan Griffith in the U.S. House of Representatives.

== Politics ==
United States presidential election results for Craig County, Virginia
Year	Republican		Democratic		Third party(ies)	
Year	No.	%	No.	%	No.	%
1912	62	11.19%	337	60.83%	155	27.98%
1916	200	35.03%	369	64.62%	2	0.35%
1920	315	45.06%	381	54.51%	3	0.43%
1924	300	36.01%	512	61.46%	21	2.52%
1928	451	47.98%	489	52.02%	0	0.00%
1932	302	31.26%	649	67.18%	15	1.55%
1936	395	37.65%	653	62.25%	1	0.10%
1940	299	31.24%	656	68.55%	2	0.21%
1944	327	36.66%	564	63.23%	1	0.11%
1948	317	39.82%	456	57.29%	23	2.89%
1952	425	46.45%	490	53.55%	0	0.00%
1956	485	48.84%	501	50.45%	7	0.70%
1960	433	44.78%	534	55.22%	0	0.00%
1964	477	38.34%	767	61.66%	0	0.00%
1968	581	46.18%	419	33.31%	258	20.51%
1972	774	63.44%	425	34.84%	21	1.72%
1976	546	32.75%	1,103	66.17%	18	1.08%
1980	768	43.17%	946	53.18%	65	3.65%
1984	1,173	57.70%	845	41.56%	15	0.74%
1988	1,112	55.46%	864	43.09%	29	1.45%
1992	1,008	43.88%	965	42.01%	324	14.11%
1996	979	45.35%	895	41.45%	285	13.20%
2000	1,580	63.38%	851	34.14%	62	2.49%
2004	1,706	65.09%	901	34.38%	14	0.53%
2008	1,695	64.67%	877	33.46%	49	1.87%
2012	1,757	65.88%	830	31.12%	80	3.00%
2016	2,140	76.59%	541	19.36%	113	4.04%
2020	2,536	80.03%	587	18.52%	46	1.45%
2024	2,562	81.72%	542	17.29%	31	0.99%

== Communities ==
=== Town ===
- New Castle

=== Unincorporated communities ===
- Abbott
- Maggie
- Paint Bank
- Simmonsville

== See also ==
- National Register of Historic Places listings in Craig County, Virginia
