= Earlehurst, Virginia =

Unincorporated community in Virginia, United States

Coordinates: 37°40′09″N 80°14′03″W

Earlehurst is an unincorporated community in Alleghany County, Virginia, United States.

== Climate ==
The climate in this area is characterized by hot, humid summers and generally mild to cool winters. According to the Köppen Climate Classification system, Earlehurst has a humid subtropical climate, abbreviated "Cfa" on climate maps.
