= Virginia State Route 419 =

State highway in Virginia

State Route 419
- Electric Road

Route information
- Maintained by VDOT
- Length: 10.54 mi (16.96 km)
- Existed: 1933–present

Major junctions
- South end: US 220 / US 220 Bus. in Roanoke
- US 221 in Cave Spring; US 11 in Salem; US 460 in Salem; I-81 near Hanging Rock
- North end: SR 311 at Hanging Rock

Location
- Country: United States
- State: Virginia
- Counties: City of Roanoke, Roanoke, City of Salem

Highway system
- Virginia Routes; Interstate; US; Primary; Secondary; Byways; History; HOT lanes
← SR 415	→ SR 420

State Route 419 (SR 419) is a primary state highway in the U.S. state of Virginia. Known as Electric Road, the state highway runs 10.54 miles (16.96 km) from U.S. Route 220 and US 220 Business in Roanoke north to SR 311 at Hanging Rock. SR 419 is a major north–south highway in the western part of the Roanoke Valley, connecting Roanoke and Salem with Cave Spring in southwestern Roanoke County.

== Route description ==
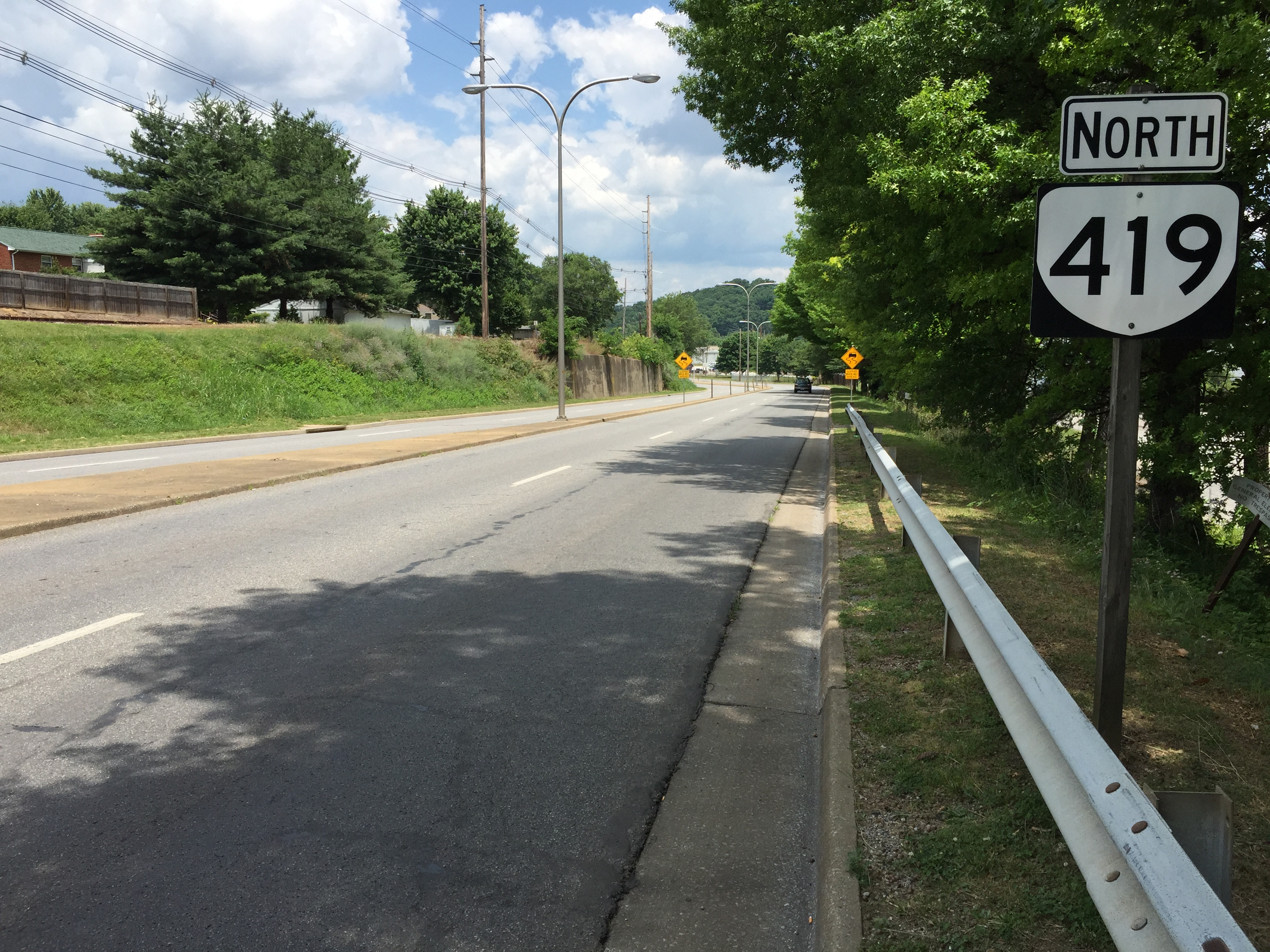
View north along SR 419 in Salem

SR 419 begins at a partial cloverleaf interchange with US 220 and US 220 Business near the southern end of the independent city of Roanoke. US 220 heads north as the Roy Webber Expressway toward Downtown Roanoke and south as Franklin Road toward Rocky Mount and Martinsville. US 220 Business heads northeast along Franklin Road. Immediately to the west of the interchange, SR 419 enters Roanoke County. The four-lane divided highway heads west past the Tanglewood Mall and crosses over Norfolk Southern Railway's Winston-Salem District. In the suburban community of Cave Spring, SR 419 intersects US 221 and begins to curve to the north. The state highway serves as the western city limit of Roanoke before entering the city of Salem adjacent to Lewis-Gale Medical Center. SR 419 crosses over the Roanoke River and briefly parallels the river to its intersection with US 11 (Apperson Drive).

SR 419 crosses over Norfolk Southern's Christiansburg and Whitethorne district rail lines and parallels a rail spur through an industrial area that contains a General Electric facility. At the north end of the area, the rail spur veers northwest and the state highway intersects Lynchburg Turnpike and Texas Street, which carry US 11 Alternate and US 460 Alternate. The intersection with Texas Street is a right-in/right-out intersection with southbound SR 419; full access to the alternate routes is provided via Lynchburg Turnpike. The state highway and the alternate routes run concurrently to US 460 (Main Street); here US 460 Alternate ends and US 11 Alternate joins the U.S. Highway east toward Roanoke. SR 419 parallels Mason Creek north out of the city of Salem and parallels the city limit north to its partial cloverleaf interchange with Interstate 81. The state highway reduces to a two-lane undivided road and curves west to its terminus at SR 311 at Hanging Rock. SR 311 heads west and south as Thompson Memorial Drive toward downtown Salem and north as Catawba Valley Drive toward Catawba and New Castle through the gap between Fort Lewis Mountain and Brushy Mountain formed by Mason Creek.

== Major intersections ==
County	Location	mi	km	Destinations	Notes
City of Roanoke		0.00	0.00	US 220 / US 220 Bus. north (Franklin Road Southwest) to I-581 / I-81 – Martinsville, Roanoke Regional Airport	Partial cloverleaf interchange; southern terminus
Roanoke	Cave Spring	2.28	3.67	US 221 (Brambleton Avenue) – Floyd, Roanoke	
City of Salem		6.13	9.87	US 11 (Apperson Drive) to US 460 west – Roanoke	
City of Salem		7.60	12.23	US 11 Alt. south / US 460 Alt. west (Texas Street / Salem Bypass) to I-81 – Salem, Roanoke	south end of US 11 Alt. / US 460 Alt. overlap
City of Salem		8.13	13.08	US 460 / US 11 Alt. north (East Main Street) / to Peters Creek Road (SR 117) – Downtown Salem, Roanoke	north end of US 11 Alt. / US 460 Alt. overlap
Roanoke	Hanging Rock			SR 780 south (Cove Road)	former SR 116 south
Roanoke	Hanging Rock	9.96	16.03	I-81 – Bristol, Lexington	Exit 141 (I-81)
Roanoke	Hanging Rock	10.54	16.96	SR 311 (Thompson Memorial Drive / Catawba Valley Drive) to I-81 – Salem, Catawba, New Castle	Northern terminus
1.000 mi = 1.609 km; 1.000 km = 0.621 mi: Concurrency terminus

== History ==
Prior to 1964, this road's route number was 119. The reasoning behind the route number change came in 1964; by that point, North Carolina had extended its State Route 119 to the Virginia border at Halifax County, and Virginia upgraded a secondary road to a primary one in response, to end at U.S. 58-360 in Delila.
