= Paint Bank, Virginia =

Unincorporated community in Virginia, United States

- Unincorporated community
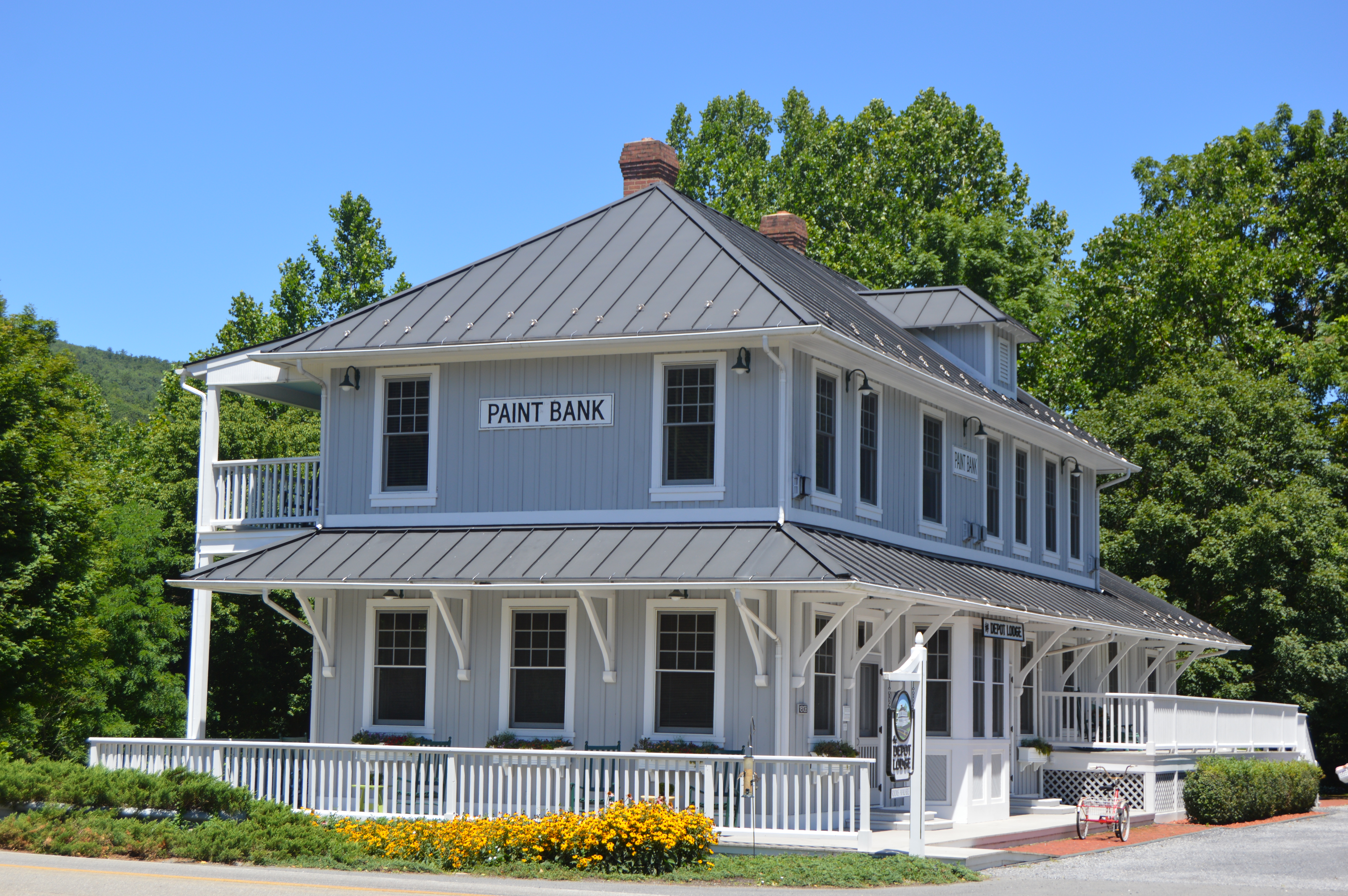
- Former train station

- Location within Virginia Location within the United States
- Coordinates: 37°34′8″N 80°15′43″W
- Country: United States
- State: Virginia
- County: Craig
- Elevation: 1,847 ft (563 m)
- Time zone: UTC-5 (Eastern (EST))
  - Summer (DST): UTC-4 (EDT)
- ZIP code: 24131
- Area code: 540
- GNIS feature ID: 1486039

Paint Bank is an unincorporated community in northern Craig County, Virginia, United States. It is located at the intersection of State Route 18 and State Route 311 northwest of the town of New Castle, the county seat. The village is located between Potts Mountain and Peters Mountain. It is one of the westernmost communities of the Roanoke metropolitan area.

== History ==
Paint Bank got its name from the iron ochre and red clay taken from the banks of Potts Creek that was used by Native Americans, notably the Cherokees, as war paint, and to make their pottery with a distinctive red color.

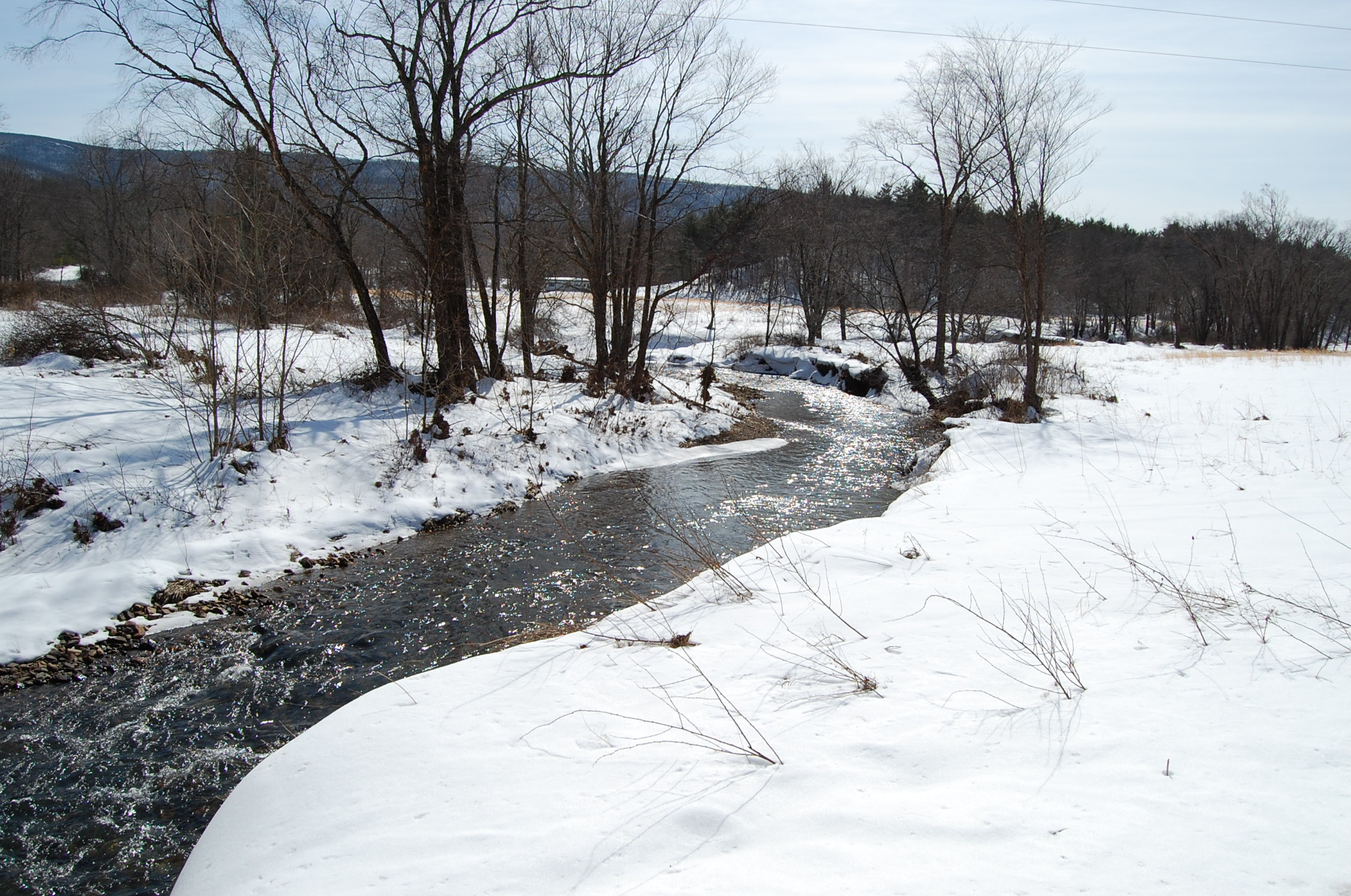
"Potts Creek on Route 600 near Paint Bank, Virginia."

"Though remote, the area is easily accessible by following the creeks that run parallel to the mountains. It is likely that the earliest Native American visitors traveled this path of least resistance, passing through and even settling here: an Indian cemetery has been found in the vicinity. The area was well known to the Cherokee, who used the red clay deposits on the banks of Potts Creek for pottery and war paint. Early maps and deeds show descriptive names such as Paint Banks, Indian Paint Bank and Painted Banks."

Reportedly settled by permanent settlers in the 18th century, during the early days of the 19th century, the same red clay was later made into a commercial paint and red bricks for permanent buildings. A number of land grants were made by Lord Fairfax and the Commonwealth of Virginia, especially the latter, around Paint Bank in the 1820s through the 1850s. The Sweet Springs and Price's Mountain Turnpike ran through Paint Bank, and it was a popular stage coach stop between Fincastle, Virginia and Sweet Springs, West Virginia.

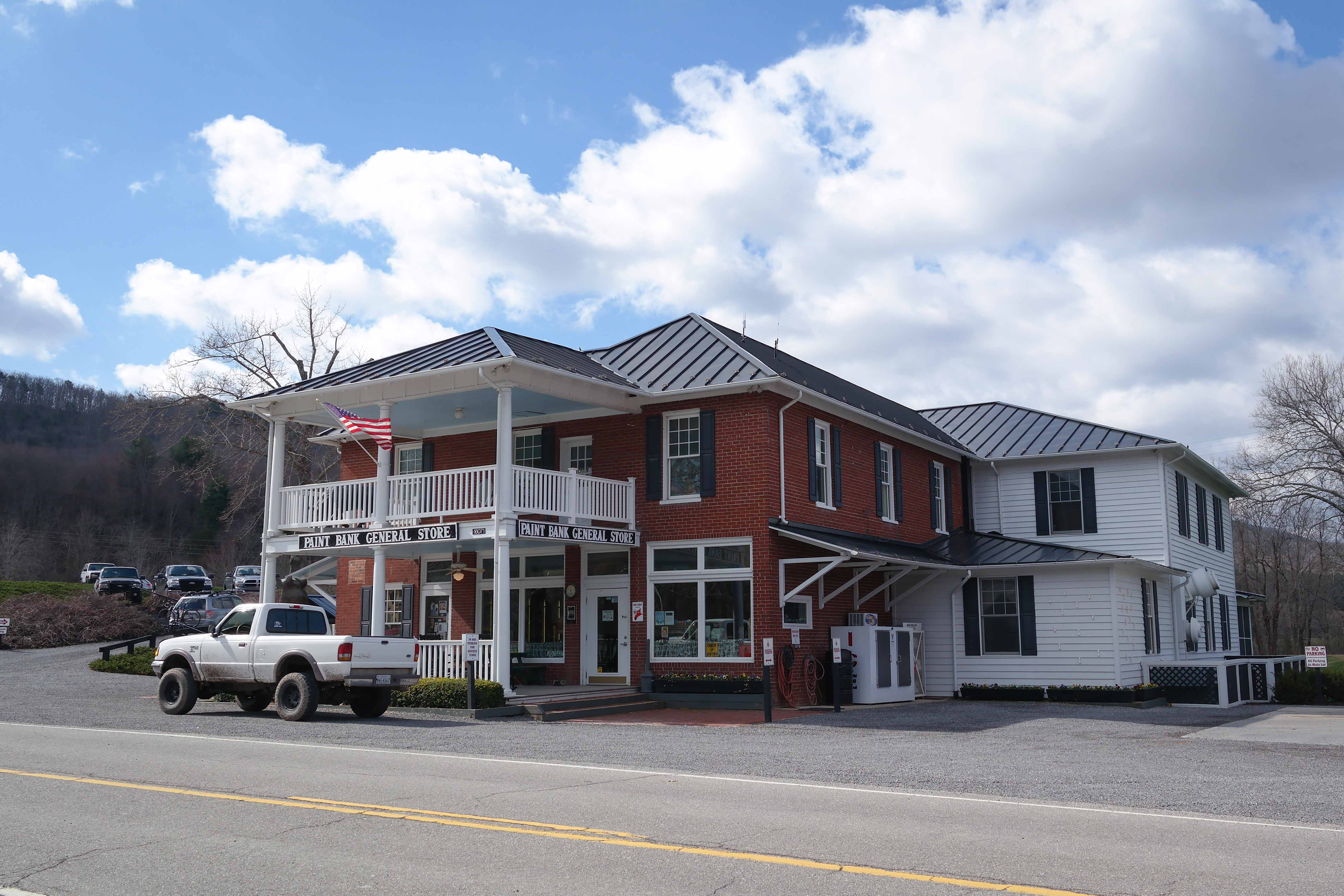
Paint Bank General Store, made with locally produced red clay bricks.

A few miles up the road between Sweet Springs, West Virginia and Paint Bank, is the location of the home of Anne Royall (June 11, 1769 – October 1, 1854). By some accounts, she was the first professional female journalist in America.

"During the Civil War, the off-the-beaten-path community became known as the "Union hole," a place for deserters and resisters. It was close to this area that Union General David Hunter fought his most difficult battle, a confrontation involving two of Craig County's highest mountains, on his trek from Lynchburg, Va., to Sweet Springs, West Virginia"

The Order of the Heroes of America, also known as the "Red Strings", extended into southwestern Virginia as well. Paint Bank, Virginia was known as a Union-Hole because of the pro-Union membership in these societies. One of the members of the Order was a Christiansburg, Virginia wheelwright named Williams. It is not known if this is the same man named Williams that residents of Back Valley, Virginia spoke about as a member of the Loyal League. "Paint Bank, in Craig County, was the core of what local citizen George A. Linton called the "Union Hole"-an area with mixed loyalties that sometimes swayed heavily to the north, in this traditionally southern state."

== Milling ==
Colonel William Preston established a grist mill for corn and wheat in Paint Bank. "The grist mill sits on Potts Creek, on property originally owned by Revolutionary War hero Colonel William Preston. Colonel Preston was given the land grants in 1780 for his service in the war." Through the years since the American Revolution, ownership of the mill changed several times, and eventually became known as "Tingler's Mill".

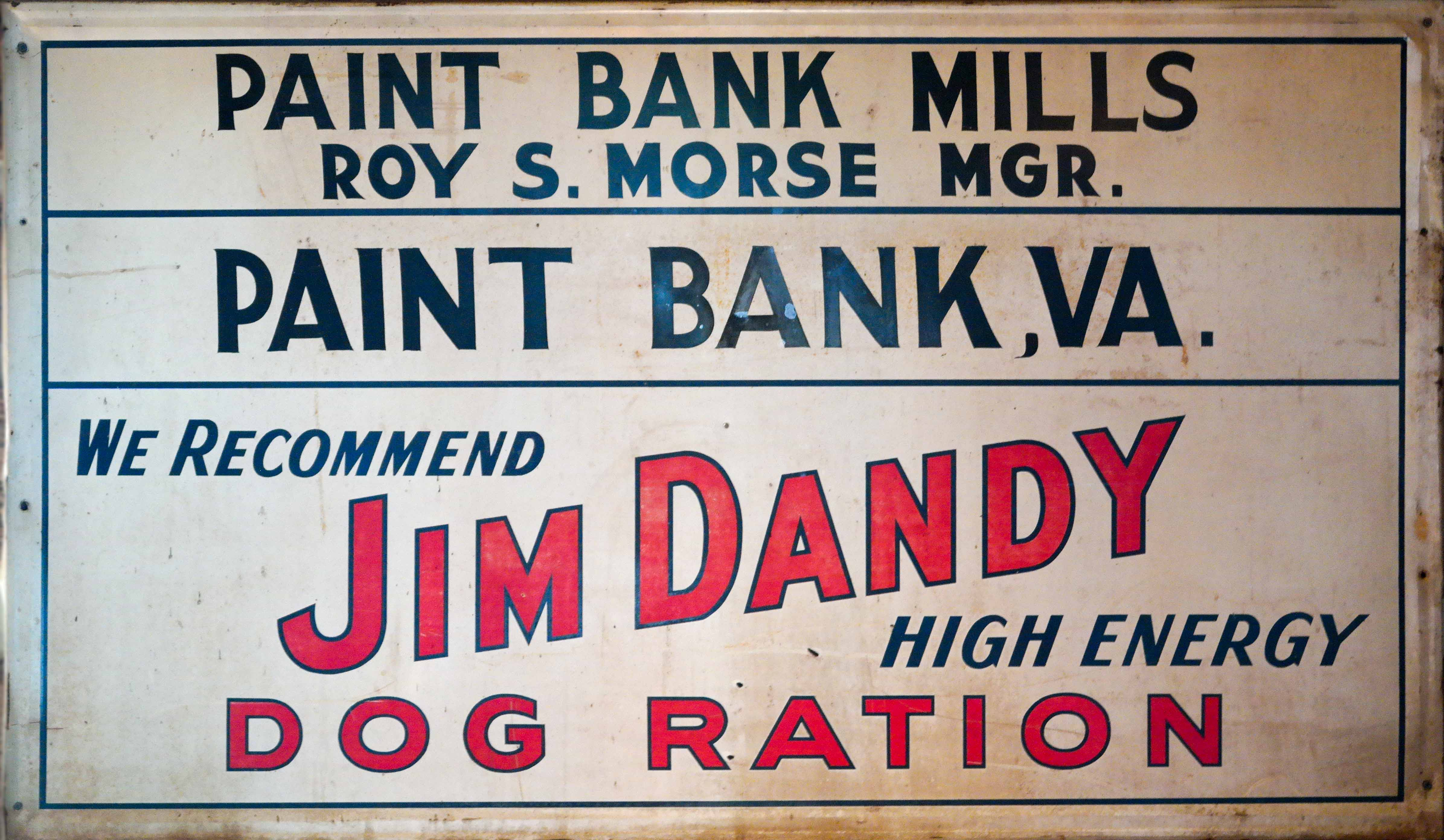
A sign advertising Jim Dandy High Energy Dog Ration at the Paint Bank General Store in Paint Bank, Virginia

Although the Tingler's Mill building today only dates to 1873, the mill site has been in Botetourt County, where it was originally established in 1783. Then the land became part of Monroe County, Virginia in 1851. Then Craig County was formed in 1863 when West Virginia became a state, then was returned to Virginia. "Because of Civil War boundary changes, the mill has been in two different states and five different counties without ever having been moved." The mill site is now undergoing renovation and conservation.

== Mining ==
Iron ore and manganese were mined in the area during the 19th and early 20th centuries by the Virginia Iron, Coal & Coke Company.

During World War I, some further investigations were made in the region for strategic minerals needed for the war. Again during World War II, the Strategic Minerals Investigations team of the United States Geological Survey promoted the mining of manganese as a strategic mineral. Sandstones and cherty sandstones of the Helderberg group are impregnated with manganese oxides, and they are exposed by a cut in the road 2 miles southwest of Paint Bank on the floor of Potts Creek.

== Forestry ==
During the 19th century, timber cutting was prevalent in the area, especially for the hardwoods. Oak and hemlock bark was used in tanning leather during this period, and these products were highly prized. The George Washington and Jefferson National Forests are located nearby, as are the Shawvers Run Wilderness and Barbours Creek Wilderness areas. On Peters Mountain are parts of the Old-growth forest. "The Shawvers Run Wilderness Area is located in northern Craig County. This is an area of rugged and remote mountain terrain on the northwestern slope of Potts Mountain, just over the hill from Barbours Creek Wilderness. Elevations range from 2,000 feet on Shawvers Run in the extreme north to 3,800 feet on the top of Hanging Rock in the south. Hanging Rock, Virginia is a 240-acre geologic attraction. Rough hiking will take you through a hardwood forest interspersed with yellow pine, hemlock, and white pine growing in some of the drainages. Within the Wilderness, the headwaters of Valley Branch contain native brook trout, as does Shawvers Run. There is plenty of wildlife."

== Railroads ==
At the beginning of the 20th century, the local branch line of the Potts Valley Branch line of the Norfolk & Western Railway. The Train Depot dates from 1909, and the Section Foreman's Cottage dates from 1910. During this period, daily trains carried out the ore and lumber, and brought in passengers and goods. Paint Bank was the center of a mining and timber boom in the early 1900s, when over 2,000 people lived around Potts Creek. The trains had to turn around at the terminus of a dead end run at Paint Bank.

Originally, the Big Stony Railway was extended from the Norfolk and Western Railroad tracks at Ripplemead in 1896. The track followed the Big Stony Creek along an easy grade to reach the timber stands in the mountains. In 1909 the tracks were extended 27 miles to Paint Bank, and renamed "The Potts Valley Branch", the "Virginia and Potts Creek Railroad" or the "Punkin Vine." The tracks were removed during the 1930s and the Depression.

== Potts Creek ==
Potts Creek, originally called "Carpenter Creek", runs through the village. The name was originally applied to a land grant of over 700 acres dating from 1750 to John Carpenter, which was located near present-day Covington, Virginia. The Paint Bank Virginia Fish Hatchery run by the Virginia Department of Game and Inland Fisheries is located in Paint Bank, and the trout that are raised there are released locally. Brown trout, Brook trout and Rainbow trout are raised there. The trout are released when they are about 18 months old, and are used to stock streams in nine counties. "This state fish hatchery, just south of Paint Bank, provides a unique look into the trout rearing and stocking process. Numerous concrete tanks hold up to 1.6 million trout in all stages of development, thus providing an easy viewing experience. Around the fish hatchery is a variety of wildlife. The creek that runs along the edge of the property should be checked for butterflies, birds and at dusk some white-tailed deer."

The earth science and ecology students of Glenvar High School raise some of the brook trout hatchlings, which survive at a rate of 10 percent, rather than the 1 to 3 percent that survive in the wild. They are released in the Roaring Run creek in Botetourt County.

== Bibliography ==
- 109th Congress Public Law 388. "An act to direct the Secretary of the Interior to convey Paint Bank National Fish Hatchery and Wytheville National Fish Hatchery to the State of Virginia." December 12, 2006.
- Bailey, Elizabeth A. Analyses and Descriptions of Geochemical Samples, Barbours Creek and Shawvers Run Wilderness Study Areas, Craig County, Virginia. [Reston, Va.?]: U.S. Dept. of the Interior, Geological Survey, 1986. U.S. Geological Survey open-file report, 86-591.
- Big Stony Railway Company, and Virginia and Potts Creek Railroad Company. Agreement between. Virginia and Potts Creek Railroad Company to Big Stony Railway Company: Sale of the Railroad, Etc. of the Virginia & Potts Creek Railroad Company. s.l: s.n, 1910.
- "Braking for Paint Bank: Paint Bank General Store and Swinging Bridge Restaurant, Paint Bank, Virginia." The Place Setting: Timeless Tastes of the Mountain South, from Bright Hope to Frog Level, Volume 3. by Sauceman, Fred W. 2009. Pages 233-235.
- Craig County Historical Society (Va.), Opal Bradley Caldwell, Barbara Todd Blankenship, Jane Echols Johnston, Clyde Givens, and Nathalie Givens. Memories and Stories of Paint Bank, Craig County, Virginia: In and Around Craig County October 2013. 2013.
- Craig County (Va.). Craig County, Virginia. Information Concerning Formation, Description, Mineral and Agricultural Resources, Educational Advantages, Streams and Water Power, Timber Lands, Mineral Springs, Resorts and Other Natural Advantages. New Castle, Va: Board of Trade, 1907.
- Damewood, Mabel Lee. About Craig Valley: A Mini History of Upper Craig Valley. [New Castle, Va.]: Craig Co. Historical Society, 1980.
- Ewoldt, Harold B., and Robert S. Sanford. Investigation of Sweetsprings Manganese Deposits, Monroe County, W. Va., and Craig County, Va. [Washington, D.C.]: U.S. Dept. of the Interior, Bureau of Mines, 1949. Series Title: Report of investigations (United States. Bureau of Mines), 4433.
- Fisher, Terri L., and Kirsten Sparenborg. "Paint Bank, Craig County." In: Lost Communities of Virginia. Earlysville, Va: Albemarle Books, 2011.
- Geological Survey (U.S.). Maps Showing Zinc Distribution in Stream Sediments, Mill Creek, Mountain Lake, and Peters Mountain Wilderness Study Areas, Craig and Giles Counties, Virginia, and Monroe County, West Virginia; Maps Showing Iron Resources in Hematitic Sandstone of the Rose Hill Formation, Mill Creek, Mountain Lake, and Peters Mountain Wilderness Study Areas, Craig and Giles Counties, Virginia, and Monroe County, West Virginia. Reston, VA: The Survey, 1982. Cartographic Mathematical Data: Scale 1:48,000. Series Title: Geological Survey bulletin, 1510.
- Geological survey (Etats-Unis). Paint Bank, W. Va. - Va. USGS 7.5 Minute Quadrangle Series. Denver (Colo.): Geological Survey, 1966.
- Geological Survey (U.S.). Paint Bank Quadrangle, West Virginia—Virginia, 1966: 7.5 Minute Series (Topographic). Reston, Va: U.S. Geological Survey, 1991. Responsibility: mapped, edited, and published by the U. S. Geological Survey in cooperation with Virginia Division of Mineral Resources.
- Geological Survey (U.S.), Frank Gardner Lesure, James R. Estabrook, and Michael Anthony Linden. Geologic map of the Barbours Creek and Shawvers Run Wilderness study areas, Craig County, Virginia. Reston, Va: The Survey, 1987.
- Geological Survey (U.S.), and Frank Gardner Lesure. Geochemical survey of the Barbours Creek and Shawvers Run Wilderness Study Areas, Craig County, Virginia. Reston, Va: The Survey, 1987.
- Gilmer, Henry. Description of Upper Potts Creek Iron Ore Beds. Lewisburg, W. Va: Dennis & Argabrite, 1892.
- Haney, Marshall. A Report on a Complete Examination of the Potts Creek Iron Property: Consisting of 17,600 Acres in Craig and Alleghany Counties, Virginia. Takoma Park, Md: M. Haney, 1950.
- Haupt, Lewis M. Description of the Chambers Survey in Craig and Giles Counties, Va. and Monroe County, W. Va. Containing 108,214 1/2 Acres.: Brief of Title and Charter of the Virginia Angora Company. [Place of publication not identified]: [publisher not identified], 1884.
- Klatka, Thomas S. An Archaeological Reconnaissance Survey of Craig County, Virginia. Richmond: Virginia Dept. of Historic Resources, 1991.
- Ladd, Harry S. Manganese Deposits of the Sweet Springs District, West Virginia and Virginia. Washington: U.S. Govt. Print. Off, 1944. Description: iii, 199-217 pages map, tables, diagram 24 cm. Series Title: Strategic minerals investigations.; Bulletin (Geological Survey (U.S.)), 940-G.
- Magnuson, Warren Grant. Establishing a Fish Hatchery in Vicinity of Paint Bank, Va. July 25 (Legislative Day, July 16), 1956. -- Ordered to Be Printed. Washington, DC: [s.n.], 1956. United States congressional serial set, serial set no. 11890; Senate report, no. 2806.
- Geological Survey (U.S.), and James L. Calver. Potts Creek Quadrangle, Virginia-West Virginia: 7.5 Minute Series (Topographic). Washington, D.C.: U.S. Geological Survey, 1967.
- Turk, David S. The Union Hole: Unionist Activity and Local Conflict in Western Virginia. Bowie, MD: Heritage Books, 1994. Summary: Western Virginia includes the counties: Craig, Alleghany and Monroe.
- Virginia, and Lewis M. Haupt. Map of the Chambers' Survey: Containing 108,214 1/2 Acres. [Place of publication not identified]: [publisher not identified], 1884. Relief shown by hachures. Oriented with north toward the upper right. "Title derived from warrants, nos. 794 and 8470, issued by the governor of the commonwealth in 1794 and 1782. Surveys made in 1794. Patent issued, January 21, 1796. Located in Virginia and West Virginia." Shows area along John's Creek and road to New Castle in Craig County, Virginia; area around Mountain Lake, Big Mountain, and Big Stone Creek, showing New River Railroad and turnpike connecting North Western Railway with the Chesapeake and Ohio Railroad in Giles County, Virginia; and area surrounding Potts' Creek between Peter's Mountain and Middle or Potts Mountain in Monroe County, West Virginia.
- Virginia Geological Survey. 1918. Bulletin - Virginia Geological Survey, Issues 16-17. "Paint Bank and Sink-Hole Openings." Pages 128 et seq.
- Virginia Polytechnic Institute, Blacksburg, R. L. Humbert, and Robert Burns Haldane Begg. Industrial Survey, Craig County, Virginia. Blacksburg, Va: Engineering Extension Division, Virginia Polytechnic Institute, 1930.
- Williams, Mary Katherine. Paint Bank: Travel Guide & History. Paint Bank, VA: PaintBank Press, 2006. Photography: James E. Loesel. 94 pages.
