= Moss Run, Virginia =

Unincorporated community in Virginia, United States

Coordinates: 37°47′18″N 80°06′06″W

Moss Run is an unincorporated community in Alleghany County, Virginia, United States.
