= Abbott, Virginia =

Unincorporated community in Virginia, United States

- Unincorporated community
- Location within Virginia
- Coordinates: 37°25′45″N 080°08′02″W
- Country: United States
- State: Virginia
- County: Craig
- Elevation: 1,371 ft (418 m)
- Time zone: UTC-5 (Eastern (EST))
  - Summer (DST): UTC-4 (EDT)
- ZIP code: 24127
- Area code: 540
- GNIS feature ID: 1495179

Abbott is an unincorporated community in southern Craig County, Virginia, United States. It lies along State Route 311 south of the town of New Castle, the county seat of Craig County.
