= Fort Carpenter, Virginia =

Coordinates: 37.7499°N 79.9892°W

Fort Carpenter, Alleghany County, Virginia, was built about 1755-1756 by Joseph Carpenter, who migrated from the Province of New York to "the big bend" of the Jackson River on the Virginia frontier about 1745-1746. It was actually a fortified house, or blockhouse. Located on a low bluff near the mouth of Carpenter Creek, it was later known as Cedar Hill. Logs and stones from the original structure were used in the later dwelling now on the site. A young George Washington visited the string of frontier forts during the French and Indian War in 1756, inspecting Fort Young on the north side of the Jackson River, and Fort Carpenter, described as a fortified house, on the south side. In 1856, Joseph Hannah Carpenter graduated from the Virginia Military Institute as a civil engineer, and later went on to serve as an artillery cadet under the command of Stonewall Jackson.
