= Hanging Rock, Virginia =

Hanging Rock
- Unincorporated community
- Location within the Commonwealth of Virginia Hanging Rock (the United States)
- Coordinates: 37°19′41″N 080°02′24″W
- Country: United States
- State: Virginia
- County: Roanoke
- Elevation: 1,120 ft (340 m)
- Time zone: UTC-5 (Eastern (EST))
  - Summer (DST): UTC-4 (EDT)
- ZIP code: 24019
- Area code: 540
- FIPS code: 51-35144
- GNIS feature ID: 1499521

Hanging Rock is an unincorporated community in Roanoke County, Virginia, United States located directly north of Salem. The community is named for a prominent rock outcrop. The intersection of Virginia State Route 311 and Virginia State Route 419 is in Hanging Rock.

== Battle ==
In the Battle of Hanging Rock in the Civil War, a retreat to West Virginia by Union General David Hunter was briefly disrupted by the forces of Confederate Generals Jubal A. Early and John McCausland. On June 21, 1864, Hunter and his men were seeking refuge after failing to capture Lynchburg, 60 miles to the east. About 100 union soldiers were killed partly because their way was blocked by trees that had been felled across the road.

"On June 21, 1864 General Hunter, retreating from defeat at Lynchburg by General Early, met Confederate forces led by General John McCausland. After losing some of his artillery here, Hunter continued his withdrawal northwest through New Castle to Lewisburg."

"Hunter retreated along the Lynchburg-Salem Turnpike (today's U.S. 460) in a wagon train that stretched for 11 miles. Union Gen. Alfred Duffie was ordered to burn the wool mill and depot at Bonsack, Virginia, cut telegraph wires and burn the rail depots in Big Lick (now Roanoke) and Salem. McCausland pursued Hunter by crossing the Peaks of Otter and headed toward Salem on the Great Valley Pike (the primary corridor for today's I-81 and U.S. Route 11 in Virginia), which was a better road and a faster way to get to the Roanoke Valley. McCausland and Confederate Gen. Robert Ransom Jr.'s men caught Hunter's army, which was slowed by the narrow gap through Hanging Rock up Catawba Mountain toward New Castle, Virginia. Local militia had blocked the road with fallen trees, further slowing the retreat."

Maps Number 10 and 10a by Jedediah Hotchkiss, 1828-1899, concern the battle. "No. 10. Map of engagement at Hanging Rock, Roanoke County, Va., Tuesday June 21st 1864, to accompany report of Jed. Hotchkiss, Top. Eng., A.V.D. Scale 1:40,000 -- No. 10a. Map of engagement at Hanging Rock, Roanoke County, Va., Tuesday June 21st 1864. Scale 1:40,000."

== Markers ==
There are several markers at the site commemorating the battle. One was placed there in 1932 by the United Daughters of the Confederacy. Another one commemorates the battle and was placed there by the Virginia Civil War Trails. Another marker, "Two Future Presidents In Wartime Retreat: Hanging Rock Battlefield Trail" commemorates two future presidents, William McKinley and Rutherford B. Hayes, who were present at the conflict.

Another marker described the attack, and was erected in 1999 by County of Roanoke, the City of Salem, and the Hanging Rock Battlefield and Railway Preservation Foundation.

The United Daughters of the Confederacy also placed a marker commemorating the 100th anniversary of the battle. "100th Anniversary of Hanging Rock." The inscription reads: "Commemorating the 100th Anniversary of the Skirmish at Hanging Rock, June 21, 1864. Erected by the William Watts Chapter, U. D. C. June 21, 1964."

There is another marker nearby in the form of a standing soldier statue atop a granite pedestal, commemorating Lynchburg philanthropist and soldier, George Morgan Jones. The monument was commissioned after Jones' death by his widow. The inscription reads: "In honor of George Morgan Jones. Citizen - Soldier Philanthropist." Although Morgan is depicted in a general's uniform, he did not advance beyond the rank of private.

== Bibliography ==
- Berrier, Ralph. 150 years later, peace abides at Hanging Rock battlefield: The nearest Civil War action to Roanoke took place a century and a half ago today. Roanoke Times. June 20, 2014.
- "Battle of Hanging Rock" Virginia Center for Civil War Studies. Virginia Tech.
- Miller, Suzanne. Discover History & Heritage. Our Region in Portrait. 2017. Roanoke Times.
- Rice, Clive E. 2003. "Havoc at Hanging Rock". Journal of the History Museum and Historical Society of Western Virginia. 15, no. 2: 63-66.

https://web.archive.org/web/20140720163248/http://www.salemmuseum.org/guide_archives/HSV5N3.aspx
