= Crows, Virginia =

Unincorporated community in Virginia, United States

Coordinates: 37°43′10″N 80°12′09″W

Crows is an unincorporated community in Alleghany County, Virginia, United States.
