= Alleghany County, Virginia =

County in Virginia, United States

- County
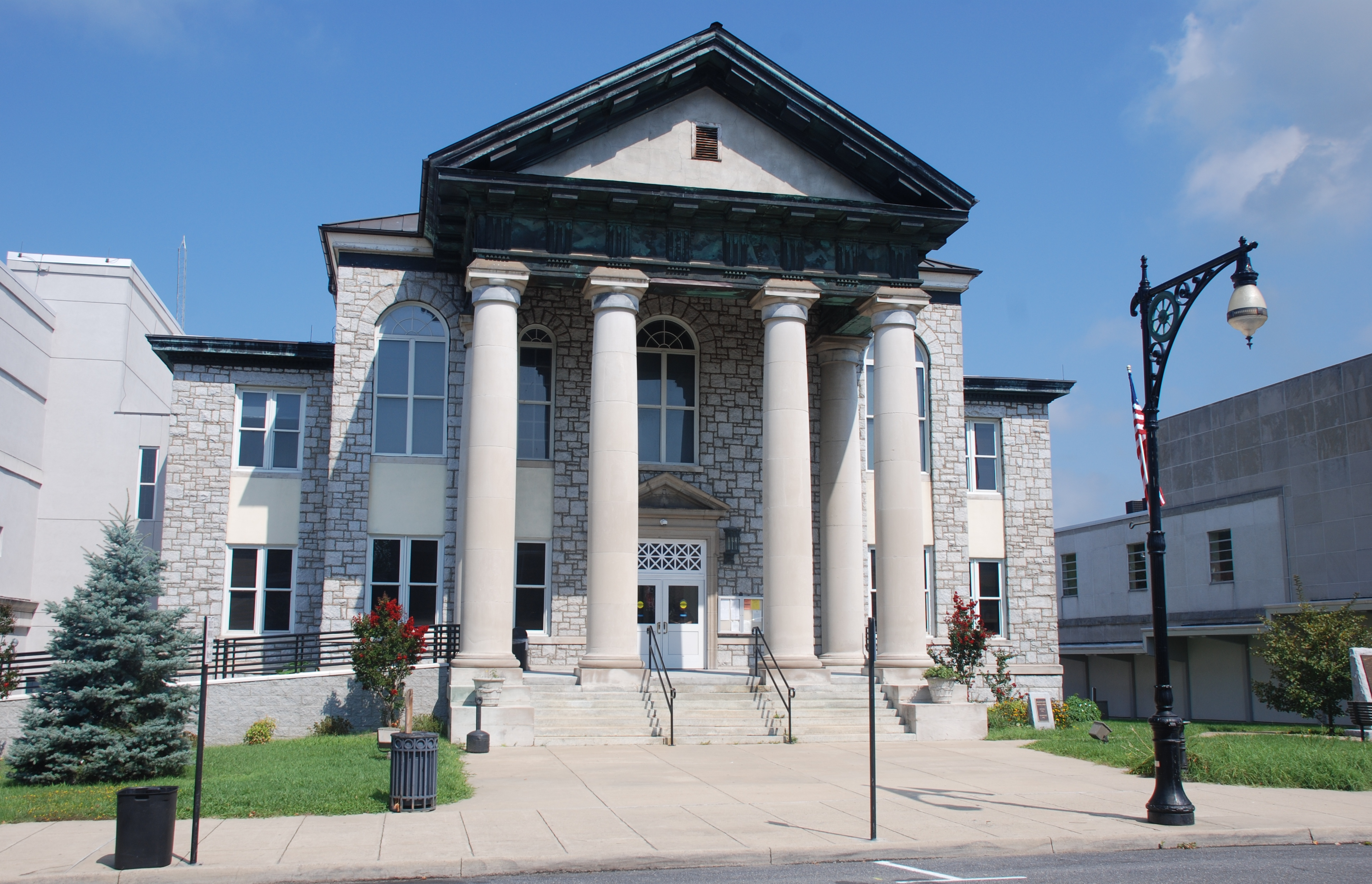
- The Alleghany Courthouse in Covington.

- Seal

- Location within the U.S. state of Virginia
- Coordinates: 37°47′N 80°01′W
- Country: United States
- State: Virginia
- Founded: 1822
- Named for: Allegheny Mountains
- Seat: Covington (independent city)^{1}
- Largest town: Clifton Forge

Area
  - Total: 449.7 sq mi (1,165 km^{2})
  - Land: 446.572 sq mi (1,156.62 km^{2})
  - Water: 3.152 sq mi (8.16 km^{2}) 0.7%

Population (2020)
  - Total: 15,223
  - Estimate (2025): 14,546 ▼
  - Density: 34.09/sq mi (13.16/km^{2})
- Time zone: UTC−5 (Eastern)
  - Summer (DST): UTC−4 (EDT)
- Congressional district: 6th
- Website: visitalleghanyhighlands.com

Alleghany County is an American county located on the far western edge of the Commonwealth of Virginia. It is bordered by the Allegheny Mountains, from which the county derives its name, and it is the northernmost part of the Roanoke Region. The county seat is Covington, an independent city completely surrounded by the county. As of the 2020 census, the population was 15,223.

The county was created in 1822 from parts of Bath County, Botetourt County, and Monroe County (now in West Virginia) with additional portions of Bath County and Monroe County added in 1823 and 1844, respectively. At the time, the majority of the population lived around Covington, and the primary cash crop then was hemp, which was used for rope production.

== History ==
Alleghany County was established on January 5, 1822, by an act of the Virginia General Assembly. The new county was formed from parts of Bath County, Botetourt County, and Monroe County (now in West Virginia), with most of the population centered in the new county seat in Covington. Alleghany County was named for the Allegheny Mountains, which border the western edge of the county.

The current Constitution of Virginia allows the city of Covington, among others in the state, to be an independent city. On July 1, 2001, the city of Clifton Forge reincorporated as a town within Alleghany County. As such, the town is subject to the county and simultaneously subject to the new charter for the town of Clifton Forge.

When the county was established, the principal export was hemp, used for rope production in Richmond. However, as hemp demand and prices declined, the farmers of Alleghany switched to grain, hay and livestock production.

During the American Civil War, the iron for the CSS Virginia (Merrimac) came from Longdale Furnace in the county. Regiments from Alleghany County were at the surrender at Appomattox.

== Geography ==
According to the U.S. Census Bureau, the county has a total area of 449.7 square miles (1,165 km^{2}), of which 446.572 square miles (1,156.62 km^{2}) is land and 3.152 square miles (8.16 km^{2}) (0.7%) is water. The county is entirely within the Valley and Ridge physiographic region of Virginia. Alleghany County is one of the 423 counties served by the Appalachian Regional Commission, and it is identified as part of "Greater Appalachia" by Colin Woodard in his book American Nations: A History of the Eleven Rival Regional Cultures of North America.

The primary tributaries of the James River, the Cowpasture River and Jackson River both flow through the county. The confluence of the two is just south of the county boundary near the town of Iron Gate.

=== Adjacent counties ===
- Bath County – north
- Rockbridge County – east
- Botetourt County – southeast
- Craig County – south
- Monroe County, West Virginia – southwest
- Greenbrier County, West Virginia – west

=== National protected areas ===
- George Washington National Forest (part)
- United States National Radio Quiet Zone (part)

=== Climate ===
Climate data for WestRock Paper Mill in Covington, Virginia (1990–2022 normals, (Note: Mean monthly maxima and minima (i.e. the expected highest and lowest temperature readings at any point during the year or given month) calculated based on data at said location from 1990 to 2022.) extremes 1961–2022 (Note: Monthly record high and low temperatures from NOAA at this location.))
Month	Jan	Feb	Mar	Apr	May	Jun	Jul	Aug	Sep	Oct	Nov	Dec	Year
Record high °F (°C)	80 (27)	79 (26)	87 (31)	93 (34)	99 (37)	100 (38)	102 (39)	102 (39)	97 (36)	93 (34)	85 (29)	80 (27)	102 (39)
Mean daily maximum °F (°C)	44.9 (7.2)	48.7 (9.3)	58.1 (14.5)	69.3 (20.7)	77.1 (25.1)	83.6 (28.7)	87 (31)	85.6 (29.8)	79.7 (26.5)	69.9 (21.1)	58.4 (14.7)	48.5 (9.2)	67.7 (19.8)
Daily mean °F (°C)	34.4 (1.3)	37.1 (2.8)	44.8 (7.1)	54.6 (12.6)	63.2 (17.3)	70.6 (21.4)	74.2 (23.4)	73.2 (22.9)	66.9 (19.4)	56.3 (13.5)	45.1 (7.3)	37.9 (3.3)	54.8 (12.7)
Mean daily minimum °F (°C)	23.9 (−4.5)	25.6 (−3.6)	31.5 (−0.3)	39.7 (4.3)	49.1 (9.5)	57.4 (14.1)	61.5 (16.4)	60.7 (15.9)	54.2 (12.3)	42.5 (5.8)	31.9 (−0.1)	27.4 (−2.6)	42 (6)
Record low °F (°C)	−19 (−28)	−5 (−21)	1 (−17)	15 (−9)	26 (−3)	34 (1)	41 (5)	39 (4)	28 (−2)	14 (−10)	9 (−13)	−10 (−23)	−19 (−28)
Average precipitation inches (mm)	2.64 (67)	2.45 (62)	3.12 (79)	3.55 (90)	4.28 (109)	4.12 (105)	3.89 (99)	3.39 (86)	3.5 (89)	2.65 (67)	2.67 (68)	2.91 (74)	40.07 (1,018)
Average snowfall inches (cm)	2.8 (7.1)	2.9 (7.4)	1.4 (3.6)	0.2 (0.51)	0.0 (0.0)	0.0 (0.0)	0.0 (0.0)	0.0 (0.0)	0.0 (0.0)	0.0 (0.0)	—	2.6 (6.6)	10.5 (27)
Source: NOAA

== Demographics ==
Historical population
Census	Pop.	Note	%±
1830	2,816		—
1840	2,749		−2.4%
1850	3,515		27.9%
1860	6,765		92.5%
1870	3,674		−45.7%
1880	5,586		52.0%
1890	9,283		66.2%
1900	16,330		75.9%
1910	14,173		−13.2%
1920	15,332		8.2%
1930	20,188		31.7%
1940	22,688		12.4%
1950	23,139		2.0%
1960	12,128		−47.6%
1970	12,461		2.7%
1980	14,333		15.0%
1990	13,176		−8.1%
2000	12,926		−1.9%
2010	16,250		25.7%
2020	15,223		−6.3%
2025 (est.)	14,546	▼	−4.4%
U.S. Decennial Census; 1790–1960 1900–1990; 1990–2000 2010 2020

=== 2020 census ===
As of the 2020 census, the county had a population of 15,223. The median age was 49.3 years. 18.7% of residents were under the age of 18 and 25.8% of residents were 65 years of age or older. For every 100 females there were 95.2 males, and for every 100 females age 18 and over there were 92.4 males age 18 and over.

The racial makeup of the county was 90.7% White, 4.5% Black or African American, 0.2% American Indian and Alaska Native, 0.4% Asian, 0.0% Native Hawaiian and Pacific Islander, 0.4% from some other race, and 3.8% from two or more races. Hispanic or Latino residents of any race comprised 1.2% of the population.

46.9% of residents lived in urban areas, while 53.1% lived in rural areas.

There were 6,699 households in the county, of which 23.5% had children under the age of 18 living with them and 27.5% had a female householder with no spouse or partner present. About 31.6% of all households were made up of individuals and 16.8% had someone living alone who was 65 years of age or older.

There were 7,934 housing units, of which 15.6% were vacant. Among occupied housing units, 77.3% were owner-occupied and 22.7% were renter-occupied. The homeowner vacancy rate was 1.7% and the rental vacancy rate was 9.1%.

=== Racial and ethnic composition ===
Alleghany County, Virginia – Racial and ethnic composition Note: the US Census treats Hispanic/Latino as an ethnic category. This table excludes Latinos from the racial categories and assigns them to a separate category. Hispanics/Latinos may be of any race.
Race / Ethnicity (NH = Non-Hispanic)	Pop 1980	Pop 1990	Pop 2000	Pop 2010	Pop 2020	% 1980	% 1990	% 2000	% 2010	% 2020
White alone (NH)	13,852	12,741	12,428	15,040	13,754	96.64%	96.70%	96.15%	92.55%	90.35%
Black or African American alone (NH)	356	328	314	751	676	2.48%	2.49%	2.43%	4.62%	4.44%
Native American or Alaska Native alone (NH)	12	13	27	25	22	0.08%	0.10%	0.21%	0.15%	0.14%
Asian alone (NH)	24	40	30	37	59	0.17%	0.30%	0.23%	0.23%	0.39%
Native Hawaiian or Pacific Islander alone (NH)	x	x	2	11	7	x	x	0.02%	0.07%	0.05%
Other race alone (NH)	9	0	11	6	24	0.06%	0.00%	0.09%	0.04%	0.16%
Mixed race or Multiracial (NH)	x	x	67	204	503	x	x	0.52%	1.26%	3.30%
Hispanic or Latino (any race)	80	54	47	176	178	0.56%	0.41%	0.36%	1.08%	1.17%
Total	14,333	13,176	12,926	16,250	15,223	100.00%	100.00%	100.00%	100.00%	100.00%

=== 2000 Census ===
As of the census of 2000, there were 12,926 people, 5,149 households, and 3,866 families residing in the county. The population density was 29 people per square mile (11 people/km^{2}). There were 5,812 housing units at an average density of 13 units per square mile (5.0 units/km^{2}). The racial makeup of the county was 96.35% White, 2.45% Black or African American, 0.21% Native American, 0.24% Asian, 0.02% Pacific Islander, 0.20% from other races, and 0.53% from two or more races. 0.36% of the population were Hispanic or Latino of any race. 42.9% were of American, 11.6% German, 11.0% English and 9.8% Irish ancestry according to Census 2000.

There were 5,149 households, out of which 29.90% had children under the age of 18 living with them, 63.20% were married couples living together, 8.10% had a female householder with no husband present, and 24.90% were non-families. 22.20% of all households were made up of individuals, and 10.50% had someone living alone who was 65 years of age or older. The average household size was 2.46 and the average family size was 2.85.

The age distribution is 22.80% under the age of 18, 6.20% from 18 to 24, 26.80% from 25 to 44, 28.50% from 45 to 64, and 15.70% who were 65 years of age or older. The median age was 41 years. For every 100 females there were 99.60 males. For every 100 females aged 18 and over, there were 95.30 males.

The median income for a household in the county was $38,545, and the median income for a family was $45,843. Males had a median income of $35,120 versus $20,855 for females. The per capita income for the county was $19,635. About 4.90% of families and 7.10% of the population were below the poverty line, including 8.60% of those under age 18 and 10.80% of those age 65 or over.

The 2000 population of what is now Alleghany County (including the former city of Clifton Forge) was 17,215. The article includes geographic data from before and after the reincorporation of Clifton Forge as a town into the county.

== Government ==
=== Politics ===
Until recently, the county did not reliably vote for a single party at the presidential level since the Great Depression era when it backed the Democratic Party candidate in five straight election cycles. It was also a bellwether for over 100 years, voting for the nationwide winner in every election from 1888 to 2004 except for 1904 and 1980. However, since the 2000 United States presidential election the county has shifted to the Republican party with generally increasing margins when voting in presidential races. In the 2020 United States presidential election, the county gave Republican candidate Donald Trump the highest margin, just under 45 percent, since the 1928 United States presidential election when Republican candidate Herbert Hoover won by over 45 percent.

United States presidential election results for Alleghany County, Virginia
Year	Republican		Democratic		Third party(ies)	
Year	No.	%	No.	%	No.	%
1912	125	15.45%	394	48.70%	290	35.85%
1916	432	43.50%	544	54.78%	17	1.71%
1920	736	51.94%	663	46.79%	18	1.27%
1924	856	52.48%	589	36.11%	186	11.40%
1928	1,642	72.53%	622	27.47%	0	0.00%
1932	1,095	45.30%	1,293	53.50%	29	1.20%
1936	1,319	39.43%	2,013	60.18%	13	0.39%
1940	1,164	34.97%	2,153	64.67%	12	0.36%
1944	1,308	39.64%	1,985	60.15%	7	0.21%
1948	1,425	37.01%	2,253	58.52%	172	4.47%
1952	2,564	52.88%	2,274	46.90%	11	0.23%
1956	1,135	55.26%	822	40.02%	97	4.72%
1960	1,214	48.79%	1,265	50.84%	9	0.36%
1964	1,104	41.12%	1,580	58.85%	1	0.04%
1968	1,649	43.47%	988	26.05%	1,156	30.48%
1972	2,584	67.47%	1,069	27.91%	177	4.62%
1976	1,756	41.17%	2,462	57.73%	47	1.10%
1980	2,185	45.94%	2,411	50.69%	160	3.36%
1984	3,067	60.89%	1,932	38.36%	38	0.75%
1988	2,555	51.87%	2,316	47.02%	55	1.12%
1992	2,294	40.55%	2,396	42.35%	967	17.09%
1996	2,015	39.71%	2,398	47.26%	661	13.03%
2000	2,808	54.81%	2,214	43.22%	101	1.97%
2004	3,962	55.07%	3,203	44.52%	30	0.42%
2008	3,715	50.41%	3,553	48.22%	101	1.37%
2012	3,595	50.12%	3,403	47.44%	175	2.44%
2016	4,874	66.54%	2,166	29.57%	285	3.89%
2020	5,859	71.43%	2,243	27.34%	101	1.23%
2024	6,093	73.47%	2,114	25.49%	86	1.04%

=== Board of Supervisors ===
- Boiling Springs district: Shannon P. Cox (I)
- Clifton Forge East district: Dr. Ronald S. Goings (I)
- Clifton Forge West district: Gregory A. Dodd (I)
- Covington district: James M. Griffith (I), Vice-chair
- Falling Spring district: G. Matt Garten (I), Chair
- Jackson River district: Stephen A. Bennett (I)
- Sharon district: Cletus W. Nicely (I)
- County Administrator: Reid Walters

=== Constitutional officers ===
- Clerk of the Circuit Court: Debra N. Byer (I)
- Commissioner of the Revenue: Sheila K. Selleck (I)
- Commonwealth's Attorney: Ann Gardner(I)
- Sheriff: Kyle Matt Moore (I)
- Treasurer: Teresa Brown (I)

=== State representatives ===
- Christopher Head of the Virginia's 3rd Senate district in the Virginia Senate
- Terry Austin of the Virginia's 37th House of Delegates district in the Virginia House of Delegates

=== Federal representatives ===
- Ben Cline from Virginia's 6th congressional district in the U.S. House of Representatives
- Tim Kaine as Senator from Virginia in the U.S. Senate
- Mark Warner as Senator from Virginia in the U.S. Senate

== Economy ==
The county economy is dominated by WestRock, which operates a paperboard mill in Covington, the second largest on the East Coast and an extrusion and converting facility in Low Moor. Alleghany County is near The Homestead in Bath County and The Greenbrier in White Sulphur Springs. Residents also commute to Lewisburg, Lexington, and Roanoke for employment. Covington has a team in the Valley Baseball League called the Lumberjacks.

== Transportation ==
Amtrak, the national passenger rail service, provides service to the Clifton Forge station (12 miles (19 km) away from Covington) with the Cardinal route. Clifton Forge serves a major locomotive fuel facility for CSX Transportation.

The area is served by Interstate 64 (east-west) and U.S. 220 (north-south), offering interstate truck access to the area.

=== Major highways ===
- I-64
- US 60
- US 220
- SR 18
- SR 42
- SR 159
- SR 311

== Education ==
The school district is the Alleghany County Public Schools school district.

Alleghany County is serviced by one high school, Alleghany High School (grades 9–12); one middle school, Covington Middle School (grades 6–8), and three pre-kindergarten to grade 5 elementary schools: Callaghan Elementary, Mountain View Elementary and Sharon Elementary. The county also contains one Virginia state governor's school, the Jackson River Governor's School; one technical center, the Jackson River Technical Center; and the Mountain Gateway Community College.

== Communities ==
Though it is the county seat, Covington is an independent city, and thus is not part of Alleghany County.

== See also ==
- National Register of Historic Places listings in Alleghany County, Virginia
