= Boiling Springs =

Boiling Springs or Boiling Spring is the name of several places in the United States:

- Boiling Springs, North Carolina
- Boiling Springs, Pennsylvania
- Boiling Springs, South Carolina
- Boiling Spring, Alleghany County, Virginia
- Boiling Springs State Park, a park in Woodward County, Oklahoma
