= Adam Weitsman =

American businessman (born 1968)

- Born: Adam Joel Weitsman; Owego, New York, U.S.
- Education: Owego Free Academy; Long Island University
- Occupations: Entrepreneur, philanthropist
- Spouse: Kim Weitsman (m. 2006)
- Children: 3
- Awards: Platts Industry Leadership Award; AMM Scrap Company of the Year Award
- Website: Official website

Adam Joel Weitsman is an American entrepreneur. He is the owner and chief executive officer (CEO) of Upstate Shredding – Weitsman Recycling, a scrap metal processing company headquartered in Owego, New York.

== Early life ==
Weitsman was born and raised in Owego, New York. He developed an interest in art collecting early in life after his father and grandfather discovered two early American stoneware bottles during an excavation project in their scrap yard in 1980. Weitsman began collecting the 19th-century stoneware and owned 60 pieces by 1982.

In 1986, Weitsman graduated from Owego Free Academy. Weitsman majored in banking at the C.W. Post Campus of Long Island University in Brookville. In 1989, Weitsman worked at a Manhattan art gallery, Hirschl & Adler Folk, and opened the American Folk Art Gallery in Greenwich Village in 1991. In 1995, Weitsman became vice president of Ben Weitsman & Son, a scrap processing company owned by his family before eventually purchasing it from his father.

== Career ==
After losing his sister to cancer in the early 1990s, Weitsman quit a career in New York City and returned to his hometown to the family scrap metal business. Here, he built up an interest in the processing side of scrap metal recycling, which led to the foundation of Upstate Shredding. In 1997, Weitsman opened Upstate Shredding at the Tioga County Industrial Park in Owego. Weitman was sentenced for check kiting in 2004, paid a $1 million fine and served 8 months in prison. In 2005, Weitsman acquired Upstate Shredding's sister company, Ben Weitsman & Son, Inc., after his father retired and acquired an 11-acre scrapyard in Solvay, New York from Peter Matlow in December 2009. Between 2012 and 2016, Weitsman acquired a scrap yard in New Castle, Pennsylvania, a port facility in Albany, and Empire Recycling in Watertown, New York. By the end of 2016, they were collectively known as Upstate Shredding – Weitsman Recycling. That year, Weitsman won the Platts Industry Leadership Award and the AMM Scrap Company of the Year award for the second year in a row. He was awarded Scrap Company of the Year by American Metal Market in 2015 and 2016.

Weitsman and his wife, Kim Weitsman, have invested in real estate in Skaneateles, New York.

In 2010, Kim purchased the Krebs restaurant, which was founded in 1899. The restaurant re-opened in 2014. Weitsman has supported local philanthropic efforts through personal funding and this restaurant. In 2015, Weitsman and his wife donated the restaurant's profits to 16 regional nonprofit organizations. In 2018, Weitsman began construction on a Mexican restaurant, Elephant and the Dove, in addition to development of a sushi bar in Owego. The restaurant opened on April 11, 2019. In 2021, Weitsman announced a collaboration with Rise N Shine restaurant owner, Danielle Mecuri, for a new Italian restaurant in East Syracuse.

In 2021, he started Viridium LLC, a cryptocurrency mining company. As of 2022, he is a billionaire.

Weitsman is involved philanthropically. He has a collection of 19th-century American stoneware which he has been donating to the New York State Museum in Albany since 1998. In 2019, Weitsman donated $100,000 for the renovation and expansion of the Rescue Mission's Clarence L. Jordan Food Service and Culinary Education Center. In 2019, Weitsman donated $10,000 to Vera House, a non-profit tackling domestic and sexual violence abuse in Central New York. In 2020, Weitsman offered a college campus he acquired to any federal, state, or local government agency to set up a base camp to help find a cure for the Coronavirus.

Weitsman is fan of Syracuse University's athletic programs, especially the men's basketball. He is a long-time friend of basketball coach Jim Boeheim. In 2021, Weitsman offered to pay $1,000,000 to local charities, following the win of the basketball team, Boeheim's Army. In September 2022, Weitsman announced that he will offer $1 million per year in Name, Image and Likeness deal to one five-star football player and one five-star basketball player to represent his companies, with a hope that athlete will find Syracuse to be a desirous destination, this however didn't pan out. He also had additional NIL deals in progress with Syracuse players, but there were no NIL commitments as of 2025.

On April 19, 2025, at Night 2 of WrestleMania 42, Weitsman was introduced as a guest commentator for the WWE Women's Championship match between Jade Cargill and Rhea Ripley. He had no microphone on his headset, contributed no commentary throughout the match, and was hypothesized by wrestling journalist Dave Meltzer to have simply paid for the privilege of sitting close to the action.

== Personal life ==
Weitsman met his wife, Kim Weitsman (then Kim DeFrance) in 2000. In 2004, DeFrance left her modeling career to work alongside Weitsman as an operations manager for Upstate Shredding. They married in June 2006 in Skaneateles and have three children.

In 2004, Weistman served eight months of a year-long prison sentence after pleading guilty to 84 counts of bank fraud.
