= Jordan Mines, Virginia =

Unincorporated community in Virginia, United States

Coordinates: 37°39′40″N 80°06′57″W

Jordan Mines is an unincorporated community in Alleghany County, Virginia, United States. It is located approximately 11 miles south of Covington and just south of nearby unincorporated Boiling Spring. Jordan Mines is commonly known as the former site of a large iron ore mine and associated town which was in operation until the 1920s, explaining the origin of its name.
