= George N. Fulton =

American potter

George William Newman Fulton (1834–1894) was a potter who worked in Alleghany County, Virginia and in Fincastle, Virginia.

== Early life ==
George N. Fulton was born in Loudoun County, Virginia in 1834, but by 1835 the family had moved to Fultonham, Ohio, located in Muskingum County, Ohio., His father, James Fulton, was a local potter. His mother, Mary Ellen Newman Fulton, oversaw the family as George Fulton learned his trade from his father.

During the 1850s he worked as a brick maker and bricklayer, but by 1856 he had moved to Richmond, Virginia, to work in the pottery shop of David Parr. There he is known to have decorated a 20-gallon cooler.

== Military service ==
George Fulton was 28 years old when he enlisted as a private in the Union Army on July 23, 1862, with Company E of the 9th West Virginia Volunteer Infantry Regiment. In November 1864 he transferred to Company B of the 1st West Virginia Veteran Volunteer Infantry Regiment. A family tradition says that George Fulton was made a prisoner by Confederate forces at White Sulfur Springs, West Virginia. It was while escaping from the Confederate troops that he saw the clay deposits in a cave near Potts Creek.

== Pottery business ==
After his military service and marriage to Sarah Ellen Schaffer and work in Parkersburg, West Virginia, George Fulton moved to Potts Creek in Alleghany County, Virginia, where he established his business from 1867 to 1875. There he provided stoneware for kitchens and business, as well as more ornate wares for the home. "He signed his more ornate pieces, but also crafted milk crocks and kitchen wares. Most were gray with indigo markings."

"George N. Fulton brought meaningful training, enthusiasm and youth to his chosen profession. His wares were salt glazed, blue-gray clay bodies with blue decorations. Often called "strong ware" or "scrodle ware", which was unbreakable on the roughest road. "Fulton Pottery produced what is described as "a salt glazed, blue-gray clay body with blue decoration." Craft Writer Mary Nichols referred to this type of pottery as "strong ware", sometimes called "scrodle ware", which she noted as being "unbreakable on the roughest road."

The remains of his kiln are near Arritt's in Alleghany County. "The Fulton Pottery kiln is located approximately one mile south of Boiling Spring, Virginia, being situated about thirty-five yards southeast of Route 18 in a relatively flat agricultural field. Recorded in 1936 in conjunction with a WPA project, the pottery site was tested archaeologically in 1987 by Washington and Lee University. The site consists of the remains of a circular stoneware pottery kiln forming a mound approximately twenty feet in diameter and rising some six feet above the ground surface, as well as an associated waster pile exhibiting heavy surface concentrations of salt-glazed stoneware waster sherds and various kiln furniture fragments located roughly six yards northwest of the mounded kiln remains. This site is identified by the Virginia Department of Historic Resources as 44AY184, Fulton Kiln A.

== Death and burial ==
George N. Fulton died in 1894 and is buried in the Nofsinger Family Cemetery near Fincastle, in Botetourt County, Virginia. On May 28, 2016, the Joshua L. Chamberlain Camp #20, Sons of Union Veterans of the Civil War had a Remembrance Ceremony, and placed a new grave marker made of pottery honoring his service. "Fulton's simple grave marker notes that he was a potter in the late 1880s. The marker is secured by pieces of "scrodle ware", also called "strong ware."

== Bibliography ==
- Bess, Leila Blanche. 1936. "Fulton Pottery" and "Dan Arritt." IN: Nancy J. Martin-Perdue, Charles L. Perdue. 1996. Talk about Trouble: A New Deal Portrait of Virginians in the Great Depression. University of North Carolina. Pages 39–45. https://books.google.com/books?id=VfkPKhinsZ0C&lpg=PA39
- Ceramics in America 2004 (Ceramics in America Annual) Paperback – October 5, 2004. by Robert Hunter (Editor). Chipstone Press. ISBN 978-0972435338.
- Historic Fincastle (Fincastle, Va.). G.N. Fulton: George Newman Fulton. Fincastle, Va: Historic Fincastle, 1987. OCLC 53034011.
- Kessler, Dorothy S. 1987. "George Newman Fulton; Potter in Fincastle, Virginia. 16 pages.
- "The Remarkable Stoneware of George N. Fulton, Circa 1856-1894". by Kurt C. Russ.
- Russ, Kurt C. 1996. "Making Pottery in Botetourt County". Journal of the Roanoke Valley Historical Society. 13, no. 2: 59–74. OCLC 857064108.
