= Jonathan Nash Glynn =

American abstract artist and businessman

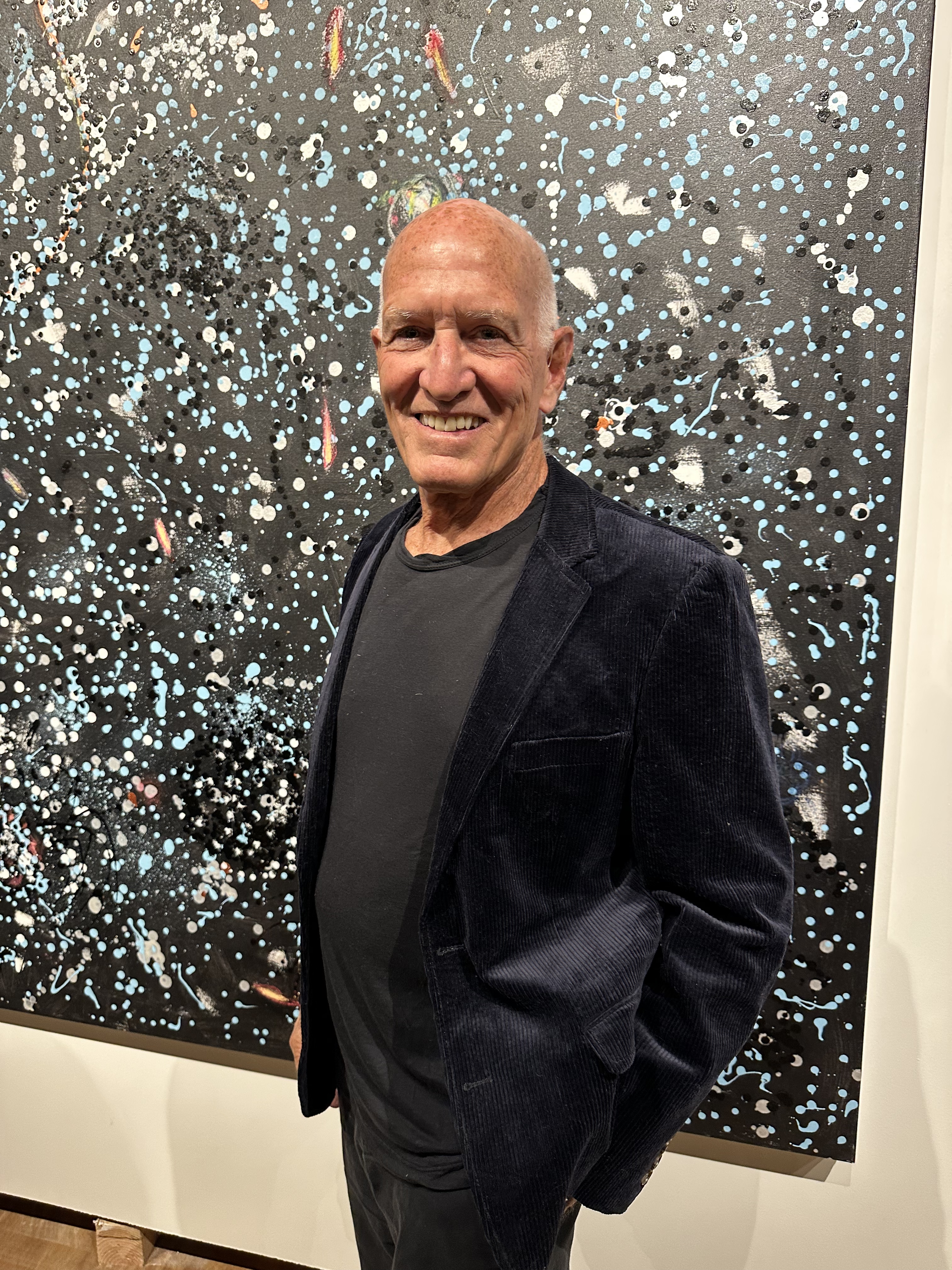
Glynn at The Bridgehampton Museum's New Space Art Exhibition

Jonathan Nash Glynn (born 1951) is an American abstract artist, businessman, and children’s advocate based in Sag Harbor, New York. His career spans over five decades and includes painting, sculpture, and ceramics, with works exhibited in major museums and galleries across the United States.

== Early life and education ==
Glynn was born in Newark, New Jersey. He received a BA in Fine arts from the School of the Museum of Fine Arts at Tufts and a Master of Fine Arts at Cranbrook Academy of Art.

== Career ==
In 1982, the former businessman and graphic designer began his full-time fine arts career, working in ceramics, sculpture and painting. He was a painting instructor at the Minneapolis College of Art and Design and taught ceramics at Montclair State University.

== Exhibitions ==
For over five decades, Glynn exhibited at museums including the Museum of Fine Arts, Boston, Detroit Institute of Arts, and the New York State Museum.

The Sag Harbor artist was inspired by photos from the Hubble and Webb space telescopes to create large abstract paintings including “The Big Bang”, The Fabric of Eternity #1, and Creation 2025, for the "New Space" exhibition at The Bridgehampton Museum in its newly renovated Tractor Barn Art Gallery.

== Philanthropic ==
He is the founder and director of Wings Over Haiti, a not-for-profit organization providing food and constructing schools in remote areas of Haiti. As a licensed pilot, he was involved in flying supplies into Haiti after the 2010 Haiti earthquake. He has been nationally recognized.
