= Winifred Edgerton Merrill =

American mathematician (1862–1951)

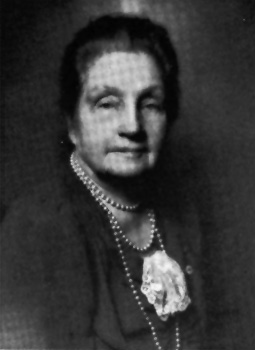
- Born: September 24, 1862; Ripon, Wisconsin, U.S.
- Died: September 6, 1951 (aged 88)
- Education: Wellesley College (BA); Columbia University (PhD)
- Scientific career
- Fields: Mathematics, astronomy

Winifred Edgerton (September 24, 1862 – September 6, 1951) was born in Ripon, Wisconsin. She was the first woman to receive a degree from Columbia University and the first American woman to receive a PhD in mathematics. She was awarded a PhD with high honors from Columbia University in 1886, by a unanimous vote of the board of trustees, after being rejected once.

== Early life and education ==
Winifred Haring Edgerton was born in Ripon, Wisconsin on September 24, 1862. She was the only daughter of Clara and Emmett Edgerton, who apparently were well enough off to build her a small home observatory. She earned her B.A. degree from Wellesley College in 1883, and taught for a time at Sylvanus Reed's School. She continued her interest in astronomy by independently using data from the Harvard observatory to calculate the orbit of the Pons-Brooks comet of 1883. She then appealed to Columbia University for permission to use their telescope. On February 4, 1884 the members of the board of trustees agreed, considering her an "exceptional case" and cautioning her "not to disturb the male students." She was required to work as a laboratory assistant to the director of the observatory.

She studied math and astronomy at Columbia which at the time was an all-male institution. Her teachers included Professor John Krom Rees, Professor J. Howard Van Amringe and Professor William Guy Peck. After her first appeal to receive a degree was rejected by the trustees, she was advised by President Frederick A. P. Barnard to speak to each of the trustees individually. At the next meeting, she was awarded the PhD with high honors from Columbia University in 1886, by a unanimous vote. Her thesis was "Multiple Integrals and Their Geometrical Interpretation of Cartesian Geometry, in Trilinears and Triplanars, in Tangentials, in Quaternions, and in Modern Geometry; Their Analytical Interpretations in the Theory of Equations, Using Determinants, Invariants and Covariants as Instruments in the Investigation".

In 1886 Winifred Edgerton '83 took the doctor's degree in Mathematics at Columbia, the first Wellesley graduate to receive that degree, and probably the first woman in the country to take it in mathematics. At the time we were greatly impressed and pleased to learn of the results of an effort on the part of some Columbia men to make things hard for this undesired student. They asked their professor to use the hardest possible text in their course in Celestial Mechanics. The book chosen was Watson's (Celestial Mechanics), which Miss Hayes' class, including Winifred Edgerton, had used at Wellesley.

Mary Williams writes that "The granting of this degree was the outstanding event of the 1886 Columbia Commencement. When she was given her diploma, according to newspaper reports, there was a 'terrible round of applause which the gallant students in the body of the house kept up fully two minutes.'"

== Career ==
Winifred taught mathematics at various institutions for several years after her graduation from Columbia. She was offered a position as professor of mathematics at Wellesley College, but declined, due to plans to marry Frederick Merrill in 1887. Merrill, also a graduate of Columbia (1885; PhD, 1890), became a New York State geologist (1899–1904) and director of the New York State Museum. They had four children.

Merrill was also a member of a committee that petitioned Columbia University to found Barnard College in 1889. It became New York's first secular institution to award women a liberal arts degree.

In 1906 Winifred Edgerton Merrill founded the Oaksmere School for Girls, directing it until 1928, when she discontinued the school and moved to New York City.

The school was first in New Rochelle but soon moved to her estate in Mamaroneck on Long Island Sound. She opened a branch in Paris, Oaksmere Abroad, in 1912. She also helped finance the American team that participated in the first international track meet for women, which was held in Paris in 1922.

She published and spoke on education and was a trustee of Wellesley College. In 1919, she published a system for "translating" signatures into music. Later in life (1948–1951), Winifred worked as a librarian at the Barbizon Hotel in New York City.

On the fiftieth anniversary of her graduation from Wellesley, a portrait of Winifred Edgerton Merrill was presented to Columbia and now hangs in one of the academic buildings with the inscription, "She opened the door."
