= Frederick James Hamilton Merrill =

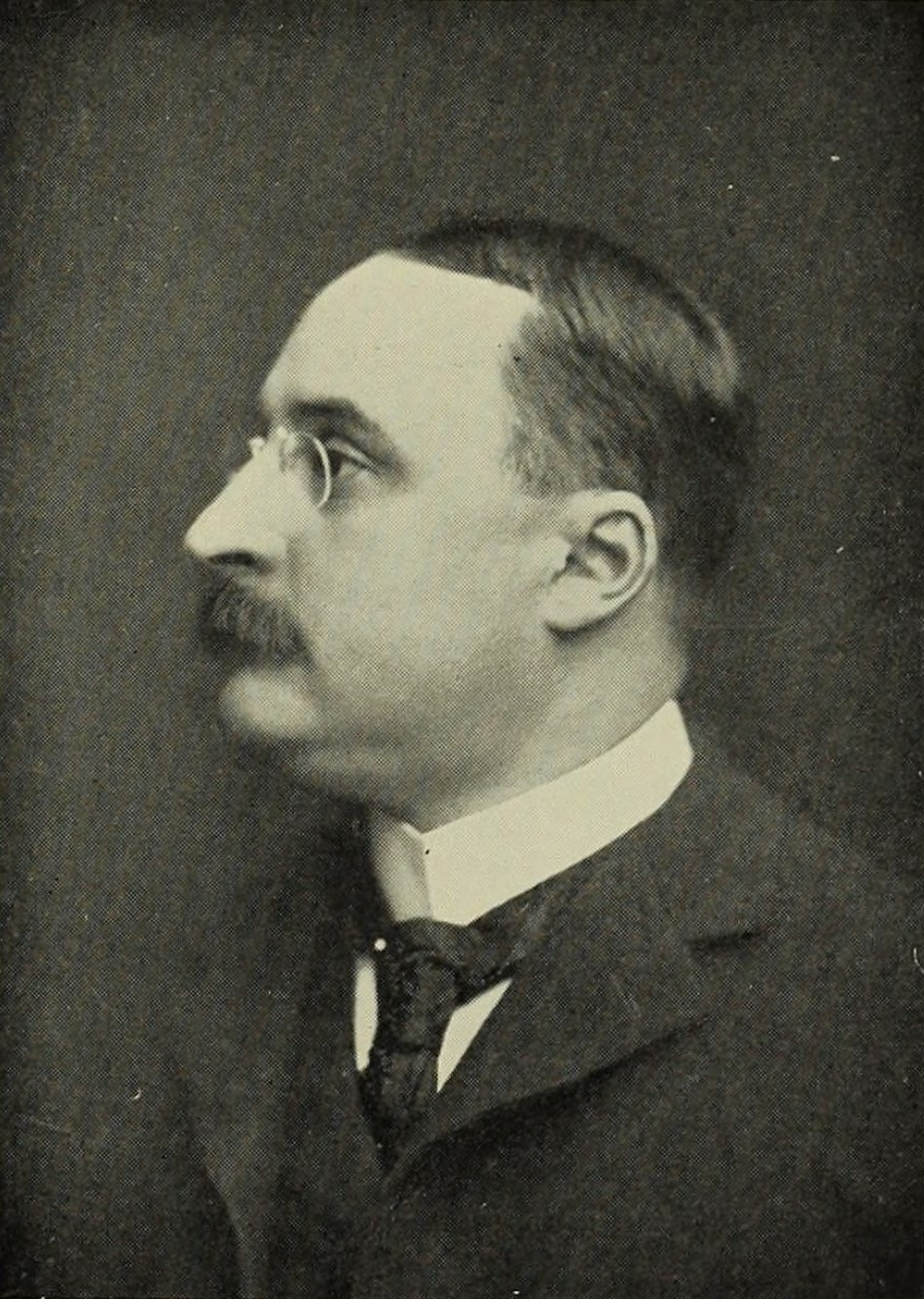
- Born: April 30, 1861; New York, New York
- Died: November 29, 1916 (aged 55); Los Angeles, California
- Education: Columbia School of Mines
- Occupation: Geologist
- Spouse: Winifred Edgerton Merrill (m. 1887)
- Children: 4

Frederick James Hamilton Merrill (1861–1916) was an American geologist.

== Biography ==
Frederick James Hamilton Merrill was born in New York City on April 30, 1861. He graduated at the Columbia School of Mines in 1885, received his Ph.D. there five years afterward, held a fellowship in geology at Columbia College (1886–1890), and was assistant in the New Jersey Geological Survey (1885–1889). From 1890 to 1893 he was assistant geologist for New York State. He was assistant director (1890–1894) and director (1894–1904) of the New York State Museum, and was in charge of the New York exhibit at the Columbian Exposition in Chicago in 1892, at the Buffalo Exhibition 1901, and at the St. Louis Exposition in 1904. He afterward established himself in Los Angeles as a consulting mining geologist. To the bulletin of the New York State Museum he contributed Salt and Gypsum Industries in New York (1893); Mineral Resources of New York (1896); Road Materials and Road Building in New York (1897); Natural History Museums of the United States and Canada (1903).

Merrill married Winifred Edgerton Merrill in 1887 and they had four children.

He died in Los Angeles on November 29, 1916.
