= New York State Museum =

State museum of New York

Coordinates: 42°38′54″N 73°45′42″W

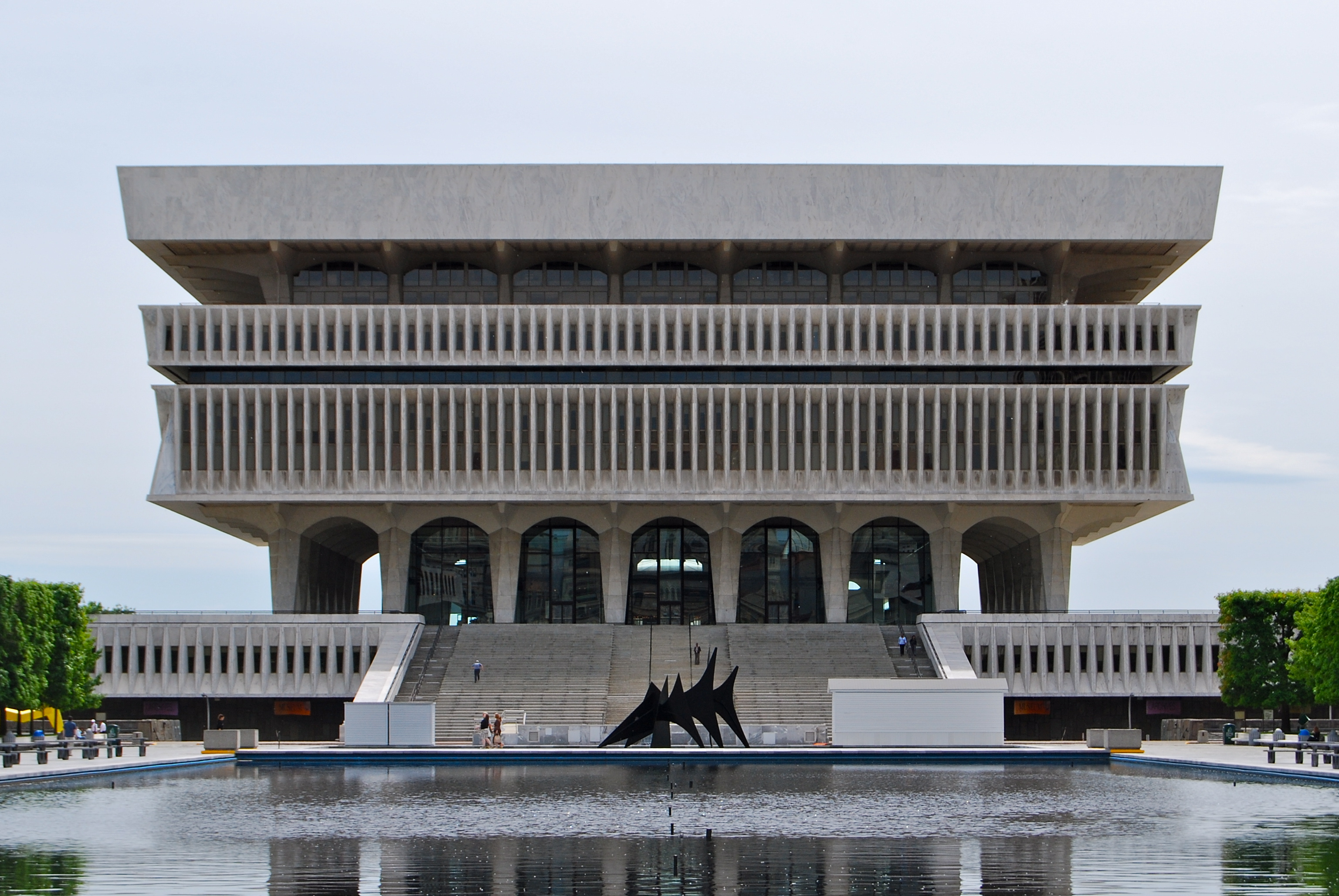
- The Cultural Education Center hosts the New York State Museum
- Established: January 6, 1836
- Location: Empire State Plaza, Albany, New York, United States
- Type: State museum of natural history, anthropology, and history
- Website: nysm.nysed.gov

The New York State Museum is a research-backed institution in Albany, New York, United States. It is located on Madison Avenue, attached to the south side of the Empire State Plaza, facing onto the plaza and towards the New York State Capitol. The museum houses art, artifacts (prehistoric and historic), and ecofacts that reflect New York’s cultural, natural, and geological development. Operated by the New York State Education Department's Office of Cultural Education, it is the oldest and largest state museum in the US. Formerly located in the State Education Building, the museum now occupies the first four floors of the Cultural Education Center, a ten-story, 1,500,000-square-foot (140,000 m^{2}) building that also houses the New York State Archives and New York State Library.

== History ==
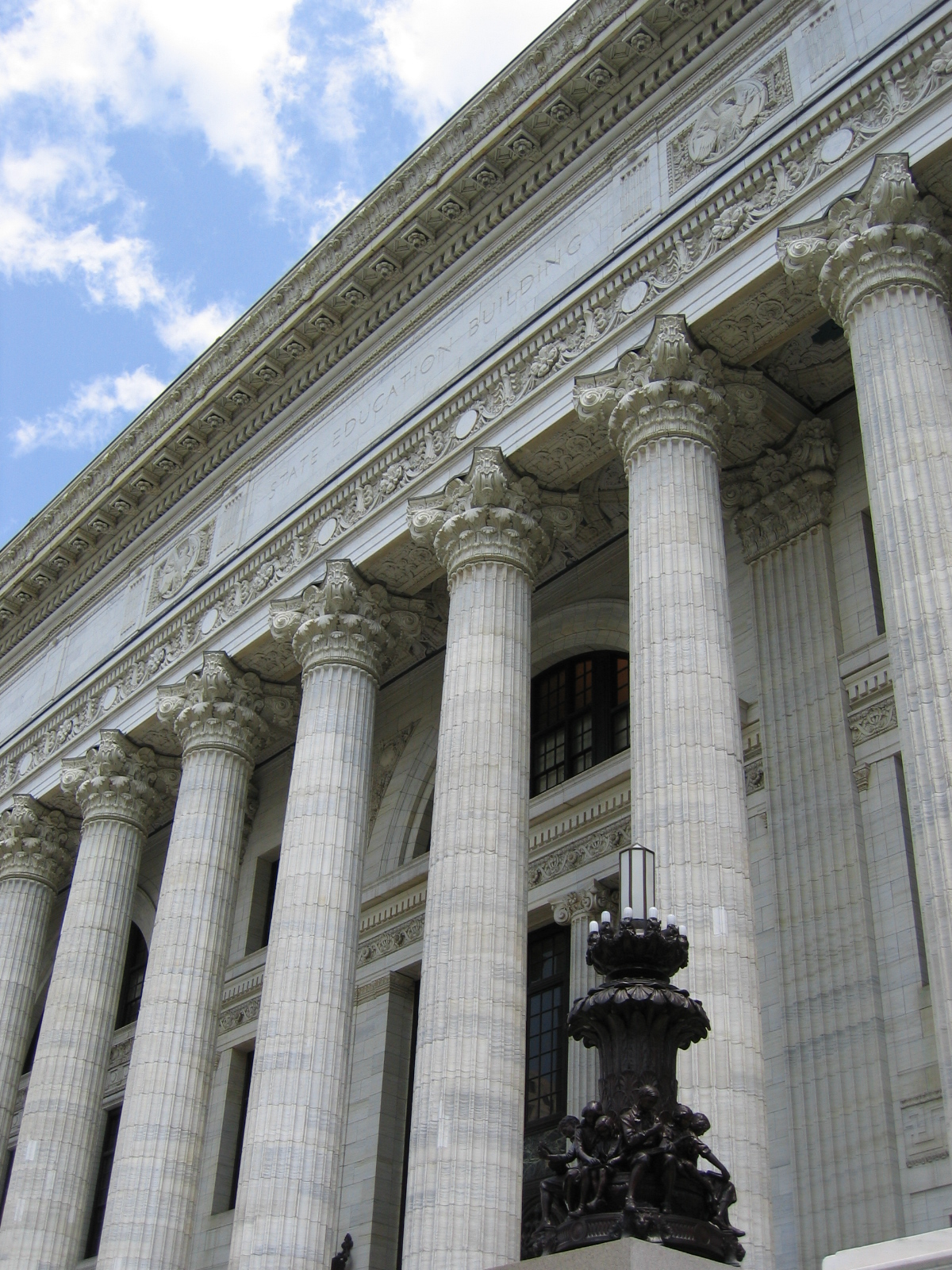
The State Education Building was home to the New York State Museum until 1976.

The New York State Museum was founded in 1836 as the New York State Geological and Natural History Survey, formed in 1836 by Governor William Marcy to document the mineral wealth of the state. In 1870, it was reorganized as the New York State Museum of Natural History under the trusteeship of the regents of the State University. The museum was located in the State Education Building from 1912 until 1976, when it was moved to the Cultural Education Center upon the Empire State Plaza's completion. The current location opened on July 4, 1976, and 15,000 people took part in the ceremony which included a performance by Don Mclean.

In June 2015, the museum announced the largest renovation in its history. Over three to four years, 35,000 square feet (3,300 m^{2}) of exhibition space was to be modernized. The NYSM is to remain open throughout the rebuilding process, although individual galleries may be closed during construction and re-installation.

In 2020, the COVID-19 pandemic forced the NYSM, State Archives, and State Library to close temporarily, with museum employees continuing to work behind the scenes, offering virtual programming and online exhibitions. The museum reopened to the public with reduced hours and days of operation and some exhibits still unopened on May 17, 2021.

=== Notable staff ===
- Frederick James Hamilton Merrill – museum director (1894–1904)
- John Mason Clarke – museum director (1904–1925)
- William Martin Beauchamp – archaeologist (1884–1910)
- James Hall - State Paleontologist (1841-1898) and State Geologist (1891-1898)

== Layout and organization ==
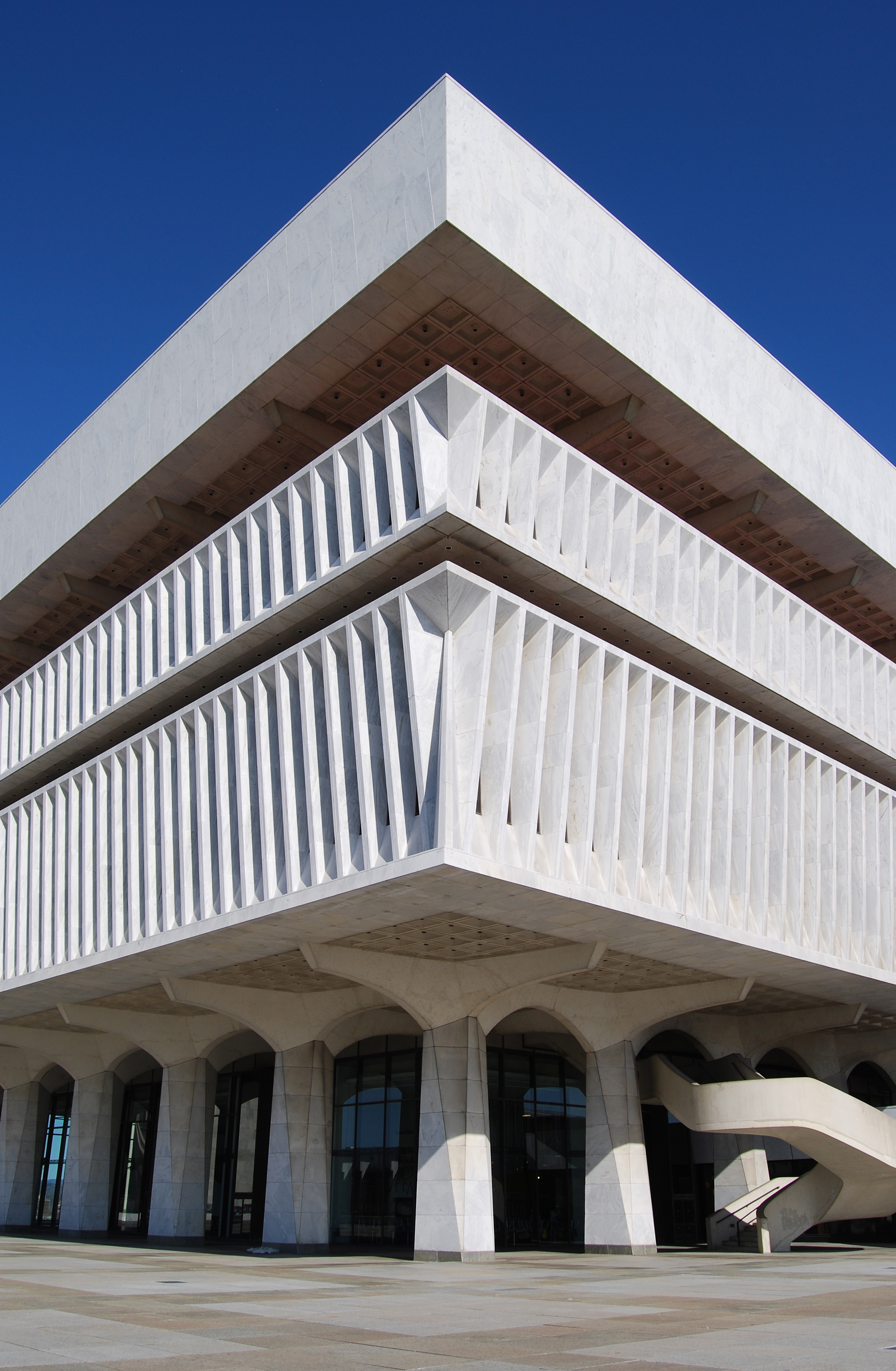
New York State Museum, Albany.

The large majority of the museum's permanent exhibits are located in the voluminous first floor, which features high ceilings that can accommodate large artifacts and displays, such as a subway car, fire engines, a reconstructed Mohawk Iroquois Longhouse, and a mastodon skeleton. Several smaller galleries and halls on the first floor house various temporary art exhibitions, as well as temporary scientific, historical, and cultural exhibits.

Presentations and lectures (such as the weekly lecture series) are held in the Museum Theater, located near the West Gallery. A student visitors center is located behind the museum's main lobby. The Museum Store, located adjacent to the main lobby, offers souvenirs, high-quality mineral specimens, and selected New York State publications on science, history, and natural history.

The second floor, generally not accessible to the public, contains education and youth services. The museum's staff, including the Division of Research and Collections and the Exhibits Division, is located on the third floor, also not accessible to the public.

The fourth floor features a functioning carousel built between 1912 and 1916 which visitors may ride free of charge, plus supplementary exhibits covering regional topics and several historic cities in New York State, such as Buffalo and Rochester. The windowed walls surrounding this floor afford visitors a panoramic view of the Empire State Plaza and other areas of downtown Albany, hence the gallery's name, "Windows on New York".

== Research ==
As a research institution, the New York State Museum houses several programs, centers, and initiatives that further the geological, biological, archaeological and historical understanding of areas within and outside of New York State. The following is a list of several of these programs.

- The Biodiversity Research Initiative (BRI)(defunct) – A partnership among conservation and environmental groups in New York State, the Biodiversity Research Initiative seeks to advance information and research for the conservation of New York State's biodiversity by funding research projects, sponsoring conferences and seminar series, and directing other initiatives. BRI hosts a biennial scientific conference at the New York State Museum. Partner groups include the American Museum of Natural History, Audubon New York, the New York Natural Heritage Program, the New York State Department of Environmental Conservation, the New York State Office of Parks, Recreation, and Historic Preservation, the State Education Department, the State University of New York, and The Nature Conservancy.
- The Center for Stratigraphy and Paleontology (CSP) – In addition to conducting basic research on the stratigraphy and fossil history of the State and adjoining regions, and disseminating subsurface geological data to the public, the CSP also works to conserve and make accessible the extensive subsurface and fossil collections of the New York State Museum.
- Cultural Resource Survey Program (CRSP) – A cultural resources management (CRM) program that conducts historical and archaeological research for the State of New York. The program's work assists other State agencies, such as the New York State Department of Transportation (DOT), the Department of Environmental Conservation (DEC), and the Office of General Services (OGS), in meeting and adhering to their state and federal preservation mandates. This specifically refers to Section 106 of the National Historic Preservation Act, a federal law enacted in 1966 to preserve the cultural and historic resources in the United States. In doing so, CRSP works closely with New York State's Historic Preservation Officer and the New York State Office of Parks, Recreation and Historic Preservation.
- The Laboratory for Conservation and Evolutionary Genetics (LCEG) – The LCEG is a molecular phylogenetics laboratory designed for use by researchers studying animal and plant evolution. The facility provides technology that allows Museum researchers to analyze genetic variability among organisms by DNA nucleotide sequencing. The laboratory also houses the museum's Genome Bank, a frozen tissue collection that complements the traditional dried-specimen collections by preserving plant and animal DNA for future study.
- The Wildlife Science and Conservation Initiative – This program works to address the impact, both broad and fine, that human disturbances and habitat fragmentation have had on the behavior, ecology, and evolution of carnivores. While their work has primarily focused on carnivores in New York State, the Initiative has also worked to develop an automated telemetry system in Panama and investigates behavioral changes among male lions in Tsavo, Kenya.

== Collections ==
The collections of the New York State Museum include geological samples, paleontology specimens, historic materials, and art. Their anthropological collections are extensive, and include the collections of several early and well-known anthropologists, including Lewis H. Morgan and Arthur C. Parker. These collections are open to researchers for analysis. A supplementary storage facility in Rotterdam, New York, houses material not presently displayed, including artifacts from the September 11 attacks.

=== Permanent exhibits ===
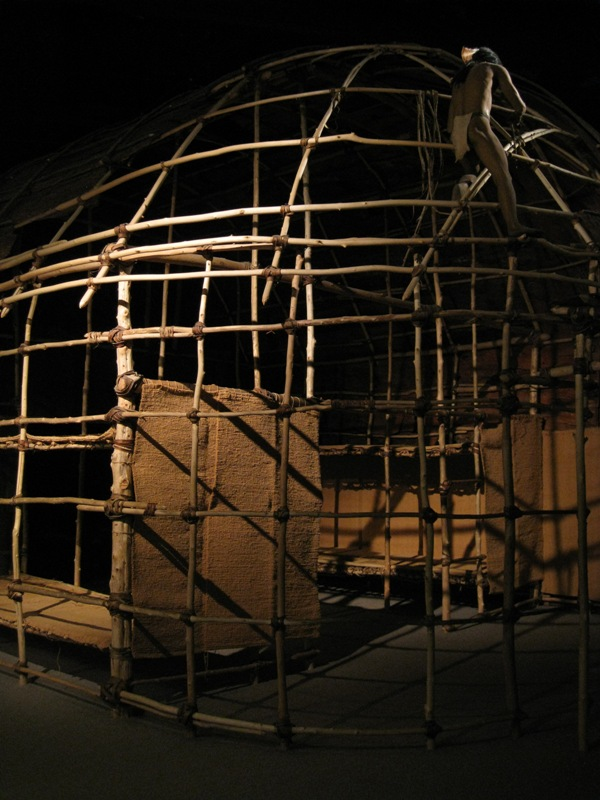
Iroquoian longhouse

- The Adirondack Wilderness – This exhibit explores the geology and prehistoric flora and fauna of the Adirondacks, the impact historic activities such as logging, mining, and recreational use had on regional environment and ecology, and the area's contemporary state, including conservation efforts, resource exploitation, and artistic interpretations.
- The American Stoneware Collection – In 2014, a collection of 19th-century American stoneware was donated to the museum by Adam Weitsman. The exhibit includes stoneware jugs, crocks, pitchers, jars, and water containers.
- Ancient Life of New York – A Billion Years of Earth History – A paleontological collection of fossils over a billion years old (some of the oldest in the eastern United States). The exhibit includes blue-green bacteria, fossilized tree stumps and spiders from Gilboa, New York, trilobites, and armored fish.
- Birds of New York – Includes a display of over 170 native New York bird species in their natural settings.
- Black Capital: Harlem in the 20s – An exhibit of the art and culture of the Harlem Renaissance during the 1920s, including a history of its development and the impact and influence it had on later cultural and artistic trends.
- Carousel – Located on the museum's fourth floor, this full-sized carousel was made between 1912 and 1916 by the Herschell-Spillman Company of North Tonawanda, New York. It remained in use until the early 1970s in Cuba, New York, after which it was dismantled and obtained by the NYSM. The carousel is fully operational, and free rides are offered to visitors throughout the day.

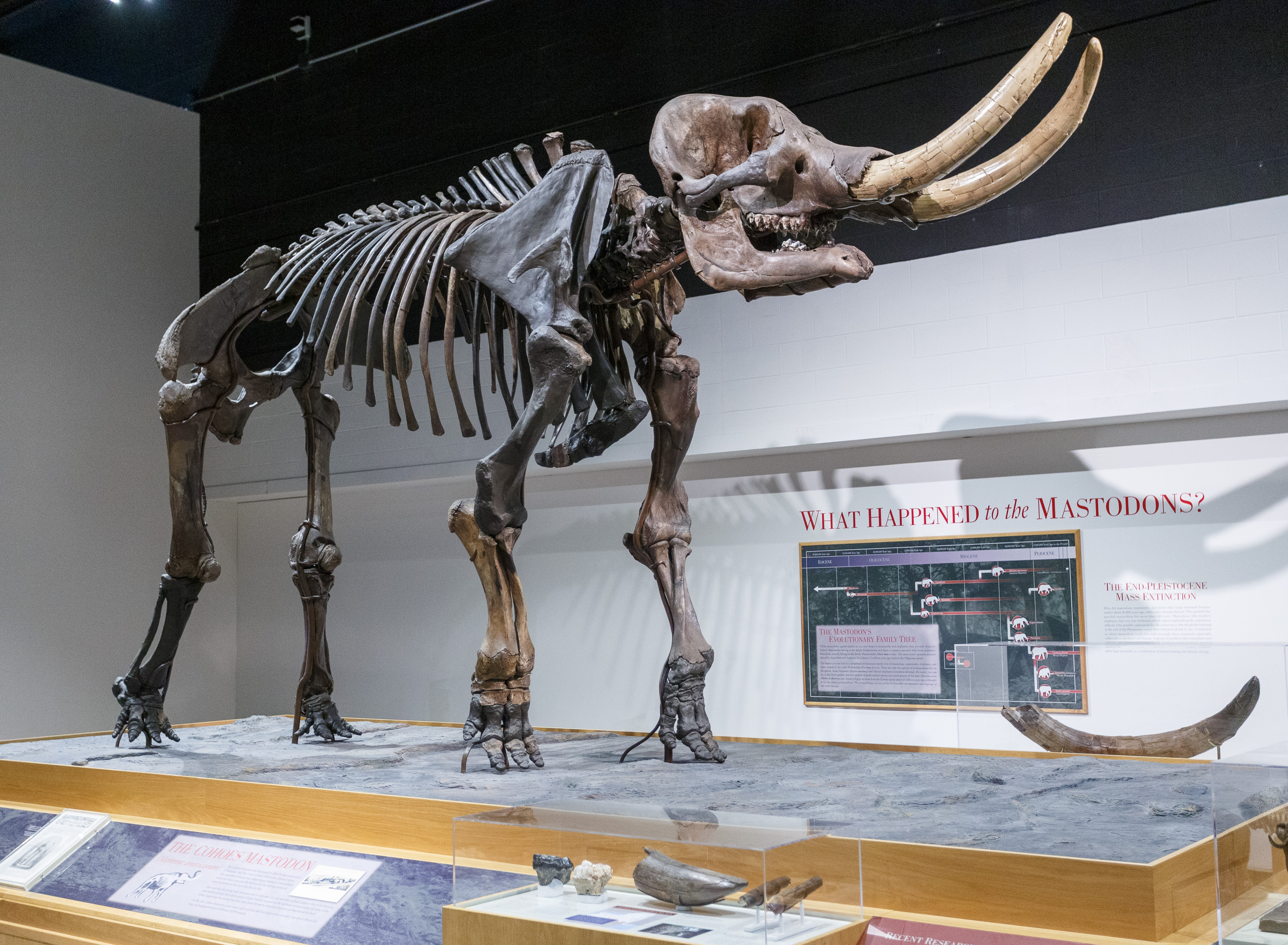
Cohoes Mastodon

- Cohoes Mastodon – The skeletal remains of a mastodon excavated in Cohoes, New York, in 1866. The skeleton was previously located in the museum's front lobby. Returned from repair and restoration in 1997, it is available for viewing in the South Hall of the museum with a new display stand and interactive learning tools.
- Fire Engine Hall – An exhibit of historic fire fighting vehicles from the 19th and 20th centuries.
- The Governor's Collection of Contemporary Native American Crafts
- Metropolis Hall – An exhibit on the history of New York City, including a complete R9 New York City Subway car, and recreations of a Chinatown herbalist, Little Italy barbershop, and other storefronts. Also included is a reproduction of the brownstone front stoop streetscape setting of the Sesame Street preschool educational television program.
- Minerals of New York – Geological displays from the New York State Museum's mineral collection.
- Native Peoples of New York – An exhibit focusing on the prehistoric and historic cultural development of New York State, spanning the chronological spectrum from the Paleoindian period (c. 10,000 BCE) up to and including the ethnology of Native groups in New York today. Included in the exhibit are numerous prehistoric artifacts (e.g. pottery and stone tools), lifelike dioramas, scale models, and a full-sized replica of an Iroquoian longhouse.
- Research Gallery – Highlights current work being conducted by staff members of the NYSM's Division of Research and Collections.
- Windows on New York – Located on the fourth floor, the Windows on New York display highlights the history and characteristics of many of New York State's different regions.

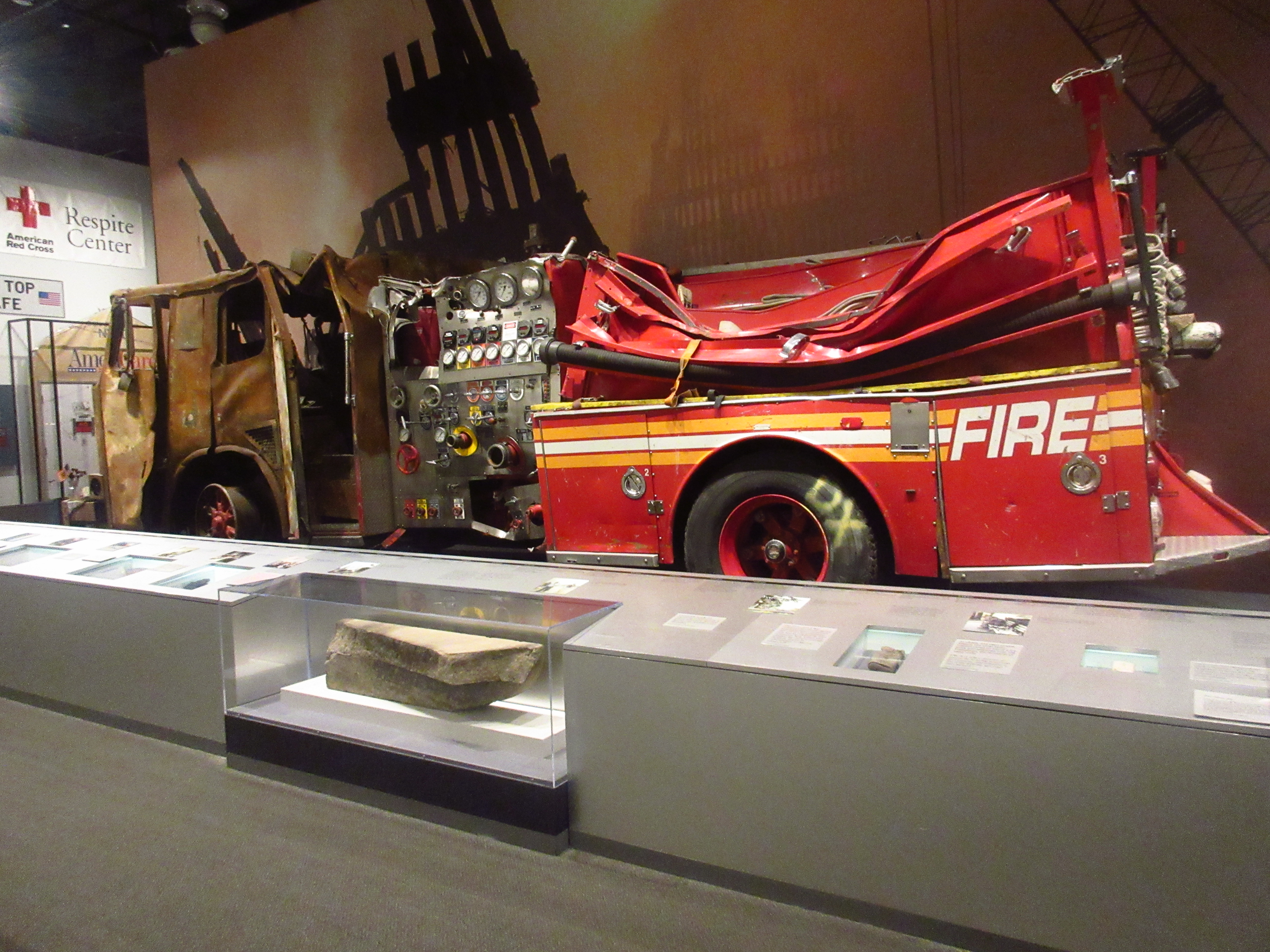
FDNY fire engine destroyed during the September 11th attack.

- The World Trade Center: Rescue, Recovery, Response – Tells the history of the World Trade Center and the September 11, 2001, attacks, including the rescue efforts, the evidence recovery operation at the Fresh Kills Landfill, and public response to the attacks. Has numerous artifacts from the site including the remains of an Engine 6 ladder truck, and the flag that was flown from next to the North Tower.

== See also ==
- List of New York State Historic Markers
