= Upstate Shredding =

American metal processing company

Upstate Shredding - Weitsman Recycling
- Company type: Private
- Industry: Metal processing & recycling company
- Founded: 1997
- Founder: Adam Weitsman
- Headquarters: Owego, New York, USA
- Subsidiaries: Ben Weitsman & Son, Inc.
- Website: www.upstateshredding.com

Upstate Shredding - Weitsman Recycling is an American scrap processing and recycling company headquartered in Owego, New York.

== History ==
Adam Weitsman, who founded Upstate Shredding in Owego, worked at the Manhattan Art Gallery. Later, he set up his own American Folk Art Gallery in Greenwich village in 1991. Weitsman returned to his hometown of Owego, New York, after he lost his sister to cancer and joined his father in the family scrap metal business. He developed an interest in the processing side of scrap metal recycling, and began growing the third generation family business.

In 1997, Weitsman opened Upstate Shredding on a 17-acre site at the Tioga County Industrial Park in Owego.

After receiving $1 million from the state of New York’s Empire State Development (ESD) fund, the company announced plans to open a media plant in Owego.

The company has two facilities in Owego, and operates in 12 locations across New York and Pennsylvania.

== Acquisitions ==
In 2005, Upstate Shredding purchased its sister company, Ben Weitsman & Son, Inc. Adam's father Fred announced his retirement in 2005, and Adam acquired a new scrapyard in Solvay, New York, in 2009.

In 2014, the company acquired Murtagh Scrap Handling, a recycler based in Rome, New York.

In 2015, Upstate Shredding bought a 5.6 million stake in Metalico Inc., a Cranford, New Jersey–based scrap metal processing company.

Various other acquisitions took place during 2012 to 2016, including acquisitions of a scrap yard in New Castle, Pennsylvania, a port facility in Albany, New York, and Empire Recycling in Watertown, which was later closed. By the end of 2016, these locations were collectively known as Upstate Shredding – Weitsman Recycling.

== Controversy ==
In May 2021, Sierra Club, an environmental organization based in Oakland, California, filed a suit against Weitsman alleging that the scrap recycler did not take adequate steps to protect against stormwater discharge from its facility in Albany, New York.
