= American stoneware =

19th century North American pottery style

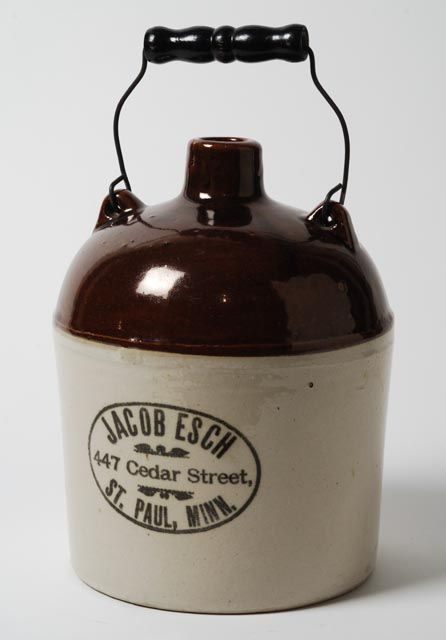
Stoneware bailed common jug with Albany slip glaze finish on the top, made in Red Wing, Goodhue County, Minnesota

American Stoneware is a type of stoneware pottery popular in 19th century North America. The predominant houseware of the era, it was usually covered in a salt glaze and often decorated using cobalt oxide to produce bright blue decoration.

The vernacular term "crocks" is often used to describe this type of pottery, though the term "crock" is not seen in period documents describing the ware. Additionally, while other types of stoneware were produced in America concurrently with it—for instance, ironstone, yellowware, and various types of china—in common usage the term "American Stoneware" refers to this specific type of pottery.

As elsewhere, not all clays suitable for pottery could successfully make stoneware; American stoneware was fired to a high temperature (about 1200 °C to 1315 °C). European stoneware originated in the Rhineland area of Germany in the Middle Ages, and was made in England by the late 17th century. Americans began producing salt-glazed stoneware circa 1720 in Philadelphia, Pennsylvania, and Yorktown, Virginia. By the 1770s, the art of salt-glazed stoneware production had spread to many centers throughout the United States, most notably Manhattan, New York. There the Crolius and Remmey families, two of the most important families in the history of American pottery, would by the turn of the 19th century set the standard for expertly crafted and aesthetically pleasing American stoneware. By 1820, stoneware was being produced in virtually every American urban center, with potters from Baltimore, Maryland, in particular raising the craft to its pinnacle.

While salt-glazing is the typical glaze technique seen on American Stoneware, other glaze methods were employed. Vessels were often dipped in Albany Slip, a mixture made from a clay peculiar to the Upper Hudson Region of New York, and fired, producing a dark brown glaze. Albany Slip was also sometimes used as a glaze to coat the inside surface of salt-glazed ware.

While decorated ware was usually adorned using cobalt oxide, decorative techniques such as incising were also used. Flowering plants, birds, or other decoration were cut into the leather-hard clay using a stylus to produce detailed recessed images on the vessels; these were usually also highlighted in cobalt. Stamped or coggled designs were sometimes impressed into the leather-hard clay, as well. Potters occasionally substituted manganese or iron oxide for cobalt oxide to produce brown, instead of blue, decorations on the pottery.

In the last half of the 19th century, potters in New England and New York state began producing stoneware with elaborate figural designs such as deer, dogs, birds, houses, people, historical scenes and other fanciful motifs including elephants and "bathing beauties."

A significant percentage of American Stoneware was signed using maker's marks and, much more rarely, incised signatures. Many pieces can be attributed to particular makers based on the cobalt decoration, clay body, form, etc. The gallon capacity of the vessels was often denoted using numeral stamps or incised or cobalt oxide numbers or hash marks applied in freehand.

American Stoneware was valued as not only a durable, decorative houseware but as a stronger alternative to lead-glazed earthenware produced in America before and during its production there. This earthenware, commonly referred to today as American redware, was often produced by the same potters making American Stoneware.

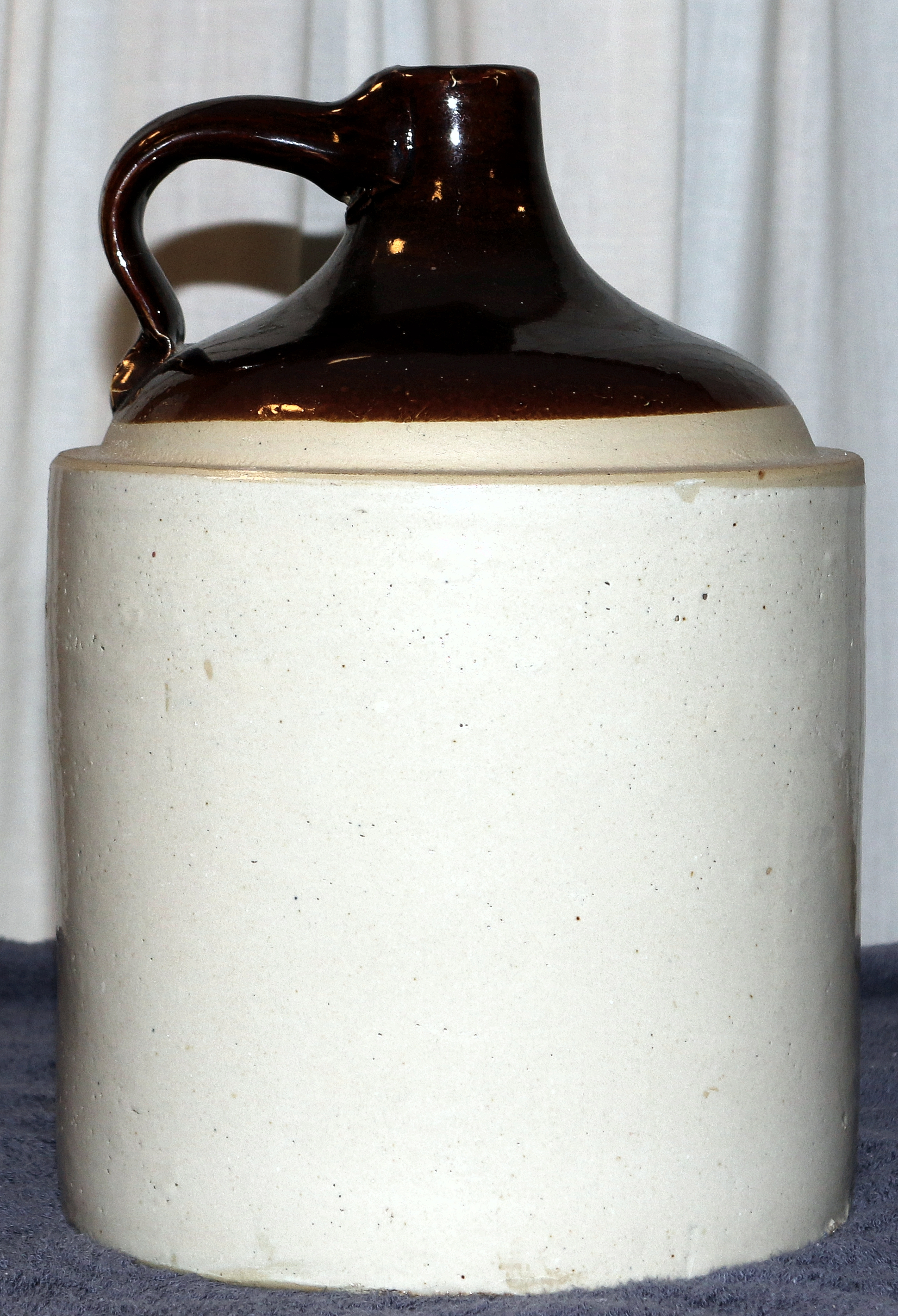
Stoneware Jug

Stoneware manufacturers of note include:

- Manhattan (New York City) — John Remmey, Clarkson Crolius.
- Bennington, Vermont — Julius Norton.
- Utica, New York — Whites & Co.
- South Amboy, New Jersey — Captain James Morgan, Warne & Letts.
- Harrisburg, Pennsylvania — Cowden & Wilcox.
- Waynesboro, Pennsylvania — John Bell.
- Greensboro, Pennsylvania — Hamilton & Jones.
- Newport, Pennsylvania — Michael and Theophilus Miller.
- Philadelphia, Pennsylvania — Richard C. Remmey.
- Baltimore, Maryland — Henry Remmey, David Parr, Maulden Perine.
- Alexandria, Virginia — B.C. Milburn.
- Fincastle, Virginia -- George N. Fulton (1834-1894)
- Richmond, Virginia — John P. Schermerhorn, David Parr, Jr.
- Strasburg, Virginia — Samuel Bell, Solomon Bell, J. Eberly & Co.
