= Potts Creek =

Coordinates: 37°45′12.45″N 79°59′52.21″W

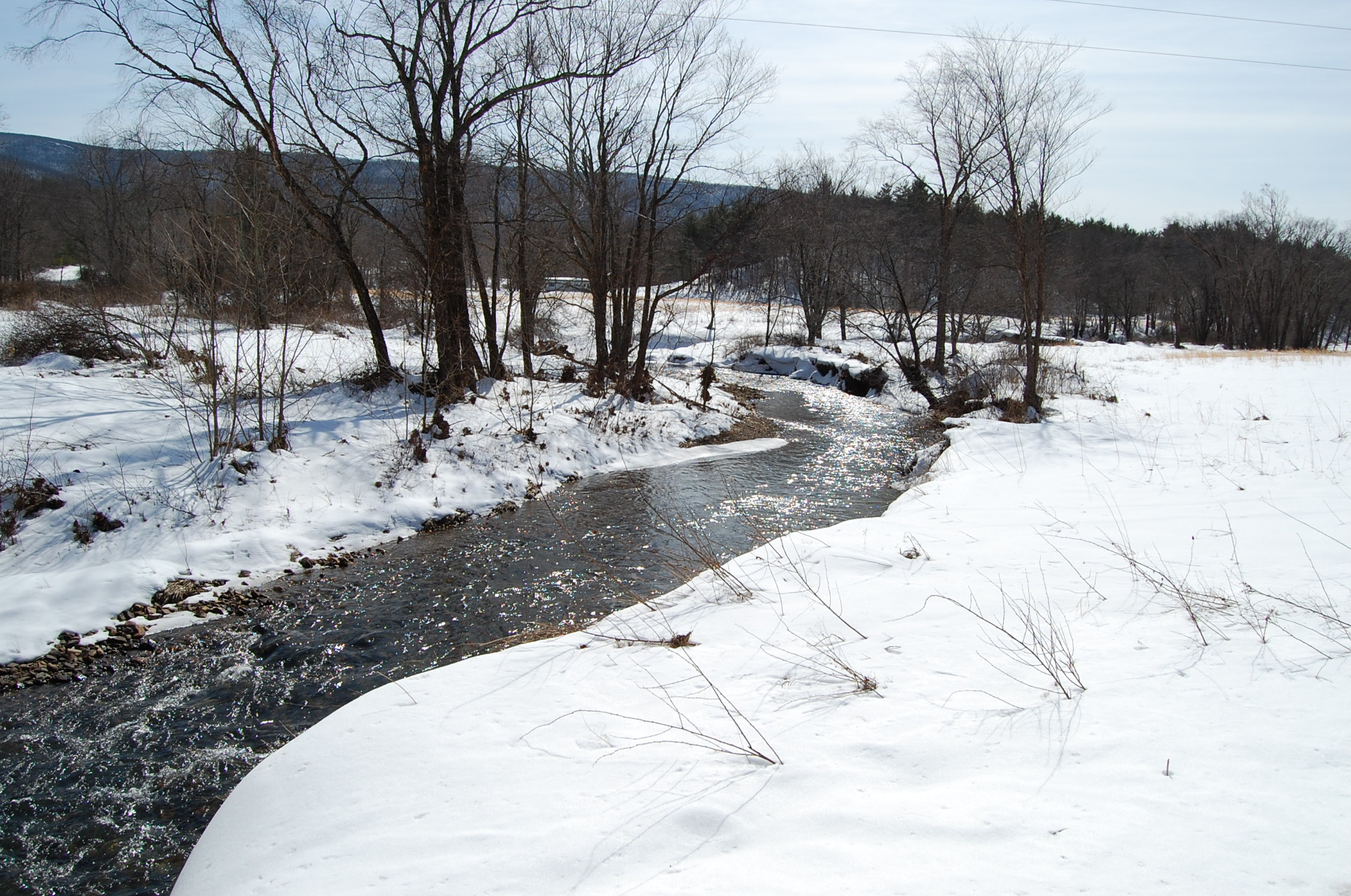
- Potts Creek near Paint Bank, Virginia

Physical characteristics
- Length: 46 miles

Potts Creek is a 46-mile-long (74 km) tributary of the Jackson River in western Virginia. Via the Jackson River, it is part of the James River watershed, flowing to Chesapeake Bay. The creek rises in Monroe County, West Virginia, south of Waiteville, and flows northeast through Craig County and Alleghany County in Virginia, joining the Jackson River at Covington.

== Name ==
The waterway was originally named Carpenter's Creek, as shown on a map of the area (view it here: File:Kitfry-1-.jpg) drawn by Joshua Fry and Peter Jefferson in 1751 and printed in 1755, and so referred to in the text of Thomas Jefferson's "Notes on the State of Virginia" that he prepared in the 1780s. Carpenter's Creek is also shown as such on John Ballendine's map of the James River published c.1772 and Thomas Hutchins' map of the western regions of Virginia published in 1778. The creek later acquired the name Potts Creek from a settler who lived further up the valley at the headwaters of the creek on Potts Mountain. The Carpenter name persisted in occasional use through at least 1784, when in a report to George Washington it was confused with Dunlap's Creek, and a grant was identified as located on Carpenter's "River" on July 1, 1793, but the name Potts Creek was in common use by the late 1790s. Carpenter's Creek received its name from Joseph Carpenter, who on June 1, 1750, received a patent from the British Crown for 782 acres (3.16 km^{2}) of land on the south side of the Big Bend of Jackson's River where the creek flows into the river (present-day Covington).

== See also ==
- List of rivers of Virginia
- List of rivers of West Virginia
