= Boiling Spring, Virginia =

Unincorporated community in Virginia, United States

Coordinates: 37°41′17″N 80°05′36″W

Boiling Spring is an unincorporated community in Alleghany County, Virginia, United States.
