= National Register of Historic Places listings in Bland County, Virginia =

Location of Bland County in Virginia

This is a list of the National Register of Historic Places listings in Bland County, Virginia.

This is intended to be a complete list of the properties and districts on the National Register of Historic Places in Bland County, Virginia, United States. The locations of National Register properties and districts for which the latitude and longitude coordinates are included below, may be seen in a Google map.

There are 4 properties and districts listed on the National Register in the county.

This National Park Service list is complete through NPS recent listings posted March 6, 2026.

== Current listings ==
	Name on the Register	Image	Date listed	Location	City or town	Description
1	Mountain Glen	Mountain Glen	January 24, 1991 (#90002161)	1 mile (1.6 km) southeast of Ceres; 37°00′12″N 81°19′48″W	Ceres	
2	Sharon Lutheran Church and Cemetery	Sharon Lutheran Church and Cemetery	February 28, 1979 (#79003030)	West of Ceres on State Route 42; 37°00′59″N 81°20′57″W	Ceres	
3	Junius Marcellus Updyke Farm	Junius Marcellus Updyke Farm	February 8, 2012 (#12000018)	4859 E. Bluegrass Trail; 37°07′31″N 81°00′59″W	Bland	
4	Wolf Creek Bridge	Wolf Creek Bridge	January 7, 2011 (#10001114)	Old State Route 61; 37°14′36″N 81°06′09″W	Rocky Gap	

== See also ==
- List of National Historic Landmarks in Virginia
- National Register of Historic Places listings in Virginia
