= National Register of Historic Places listings in Craig County, Virginia =

Location of Craig County in Virginia

This is a list of the National Register of Historic Places listings in Craig County, Virginia.

This is intended to be a complete list of the properties and districts on the National Register of Historic Places in Craig County, Virginia, United States. The locations of National Register properties and districts for which the latitude and longitude coordinates are included below, may be seen in an online map.

There are 6 properties and districts listed on the National Register in the county.

This National Park Service list is complete through NPS recent listings posted March 6, 2026.

== Current listings ==
	Name on the Register	Image	Date listed	Location	City or town	Description
1	Bellevue		November 18, 2020 (#100005801)	14505 Cumberland Gap Rd. (VA 42); 37°25′08″N 80°15′56″W	New Castle vicinity	
2	Craig County Poor Farm		December 7, 2020 (#100005895)	630 Poorhouse Farm Run; 37°25′23″N 80°16′46″W	New Castle	
3	Craig Healing Springs	Craig Healing Springs	July 21, 1982 (#82004551)	Dicks Creek Rd. 37°29′05″N 80°17′32″W	Craig Springs	
4	Gravel Hill Christian Church	Gravel Hill Christian Church	March 2, 2023 (#100008670)	197 Gravel Hill Rd. 37°23′13″N 80°21′35″W	Simmonsville	
5	Huffman House	Huffman House	May 26, 2005 (#04001546)	State Route 42; 37°20′50″N 80°24′07″W	Newport	
6	New Castle Historic District	New Castle Historic District	October 25, 1973 (#73002005)	Main and Court Sts.; also Boyd, Broad, Court, Main, Market, Middle, Race, and Walnut Sts., State Routes 42 and 311, Mitchell Dr., and Salem Ave. 37°30′14″N 80°06′35″W	New Castle	Second set of boundaries represents a boundary increase of June 10, 1993

== See also ==
- List of National Historic Landmarks in Virginia
- National Register of Historic Places listings in Virginia
