= Sharon Church =

Sharon Church may refer to:

- Sharon Church (artist), American jeweller
- New Sharon Congregational Church, New Sharon, Maine
- Sharon Moravian Church, Barbados
- Sharon Lutheran Church and Cemetery, Bland County, Virginia
- Sharon Methodist Episcopal Church, Clinton County, Iowa
