= New Castle Historic District =

New Castle Historic District may refer to:

- New Castle Historic District (New Castle, Delaware)
- New Castle Historic District (New Castle, Virginia)
