= National Register of Historic Places listings in Manassas Park, Virginia =

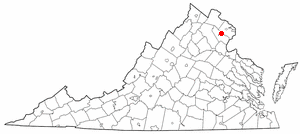
Location of Manassas Park in Virginia

This is a list of the National Register of Historic Places listings in Manassas Park, Virginia.

This is intended to be a complete list of the properties and districts on the National Register of Historic Places in the independent city of Manassas Park, Virginia, United States. The locations of National Register properties and districts for which the latitude and longitude coordinates are included below, may be seen in Google Maps.

There are 2 properties and districts listed on the National Register in the city.

This National Park Service list is complete through NPS recent listings posted June 20, 2025.

== Current listings ==
| | Name on the Register | Image | Date listed | Location | Description |
|---|---|---|---|---|---|
| 1 | Conner House | Conner House | October 6, 1981 (#81000645) | Conner Dr. 38°45′56″N 77°26′43″W | |
| 2 | Louisiana Brigade Winter Camp | Louisiana Brigade Winter Camp | November 16, 1989 (#89001912) | Birmingham Dr. 38°45′45″N 77°25′30″W | |

== See also ==
- List of National Historic Landmarks in Virginia
- National Register of Historic Places listings in Virginia
- National Register of Historic Places listings in Prince William County, Virginia
