= National Register of Historic Places listings in Norton, Virginia =

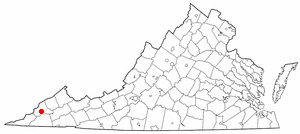
Location of Norton in Virginia

This is a list of the National Register of Historic Places listings in Norton, Virginia.

This is intended to be a detailed table of the property on the National Register of Historic Places in Norton, Virginia, United States. The locations of National Register properties and districts for which the latitude and longitude coordinates are included below, may be seen in a Google map.

There is 1 property listed on the National Register in the city.

This National Park Service list is complete through NPS recent listings posted February 6, 2026.

== Current listing ==
	Name on the Register	Image	Date listed	Location	Description
1	Hotel Norton	Hotel Norton	May 16, 2002 (#02000524)	798 Park Ave. 36°56′02″N 82°37′47″W	

== See also ==
- List of National Historic Landmarks in Virginia
- National Register of Historic Places listings in Virginia
- National Register of Historic Places listings in Wise County, Virginia
