= National Register of Historic Places listings in Buchanan County, Virginia =

Location of Buchanan County in Virginia

This is a list of the National Register of Historic Places listings in Buchanan County, Virginia.

This is intended to be a detailed table of the property on the National Register of Historic Places in Buchanan County, Virginia, United States. The locations of National Register properties and districts for which the latitude and longitude coordinates are included below, may be seen in a Google map.

There is 1 property listed on the National Register in the county. Another property was once listed but has been removed.

This National Park Service list is complete through NPS recent listings posted March 6, 2026.

== Current listings ==
	Name on the Register	Image	Date listed	Location	City or town	Description
1	Buchanan County Courthouse	Buchanan County Courthouse	September 16, 1982 (#82004545)	Walnut and Main Sts. 37°16′40″N 82°05′57″W	Grundy	

== Former listing ==
	Name on the Register	Image	Date listed	Date removed	Location	City or town	Description
1	Whitewood High School	Whitewood High School	September 12, 2008 (#08000893)	October 11, 2016	17424 Dismal River Rd. 37°14′33″N 81°52′18″W	Whitewood	Demolished in June 2010

== See also ==
- List of National Historic Landmarks in Virginia
- National Register of Historic Places listings in Virginia
