= National Register of Historic Places listings in Virginia =

Map of Virginia

Buildings, sites, districts, and objects in Virginia listed on the National Register of Historic Places:

As of September 18, 2017, there are 3,027 properties and districts listed on the National Register of Historic Places in all 95 Virginia counties and 37 of the 38 independent cities, including 120 National Historic Landmarks and National Historic Landmark Districts, four National Historical Parks, two national monuments, two National Battlefield Parks, one National Memorial, one National Battlefield and one National Military Park.

This National Park Service list is complete through NPS recent listings posted October 23, 2026.

== Current listings by county and independent city ==
Map of Virginia counties and independent cities

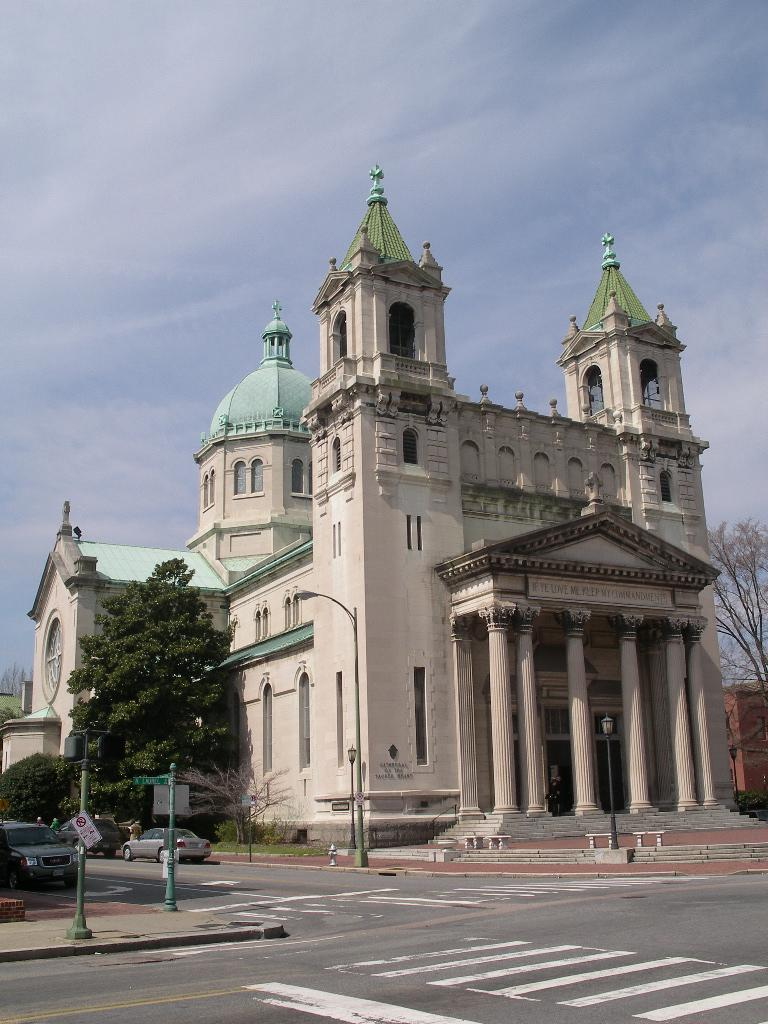
Cathedral of the Sacred Heart in Richmond

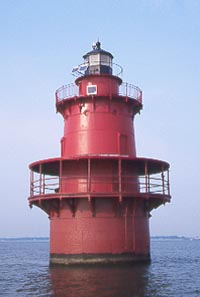
Newport News Middle Ground Light, Newport News

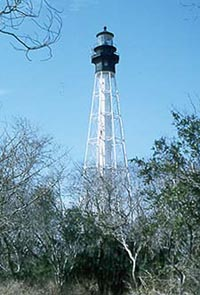
Cape Charles Lighthouse, Kiptopeke

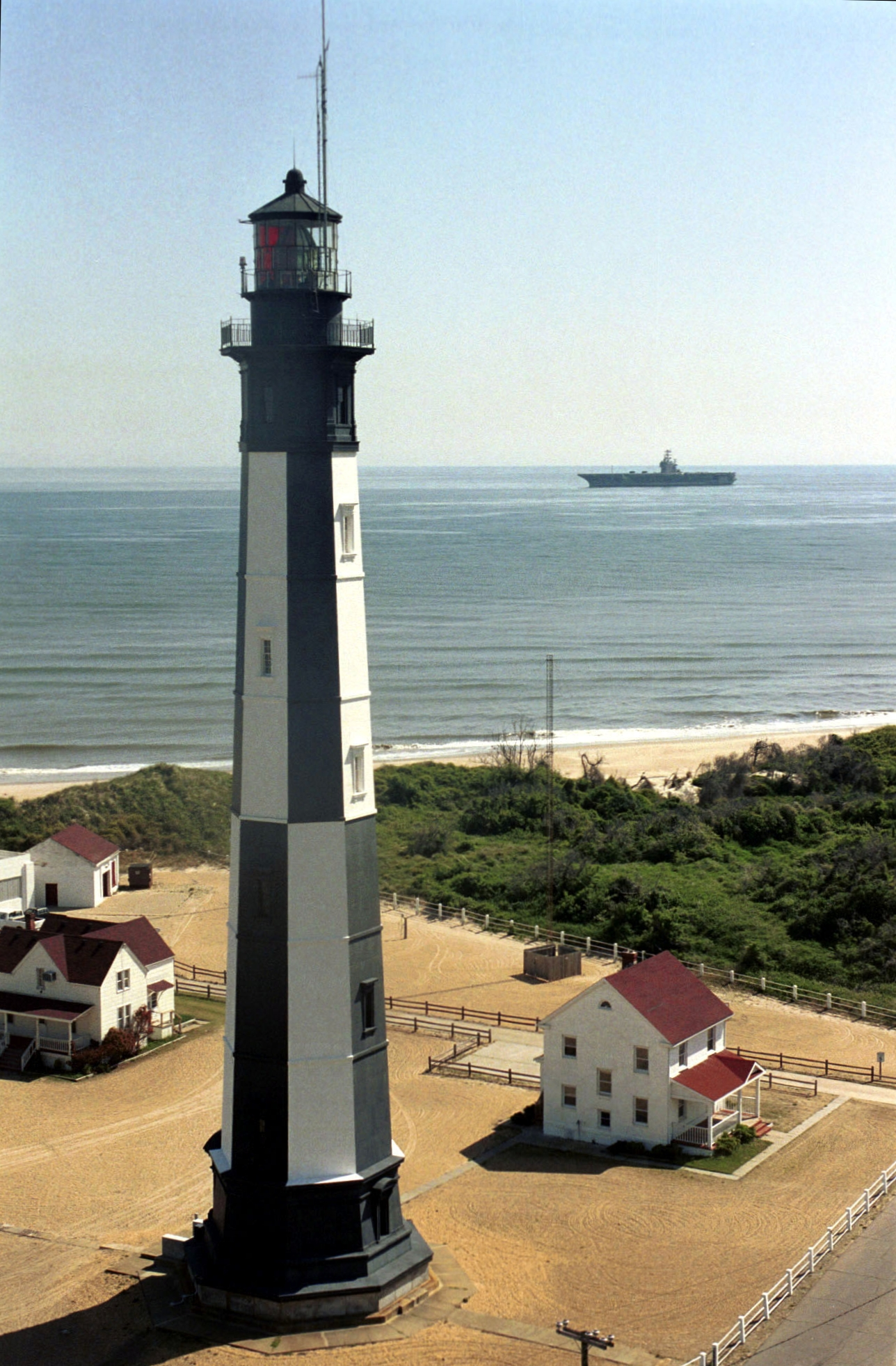
Cape Henry (Second Tower) Light Station, Fort Story

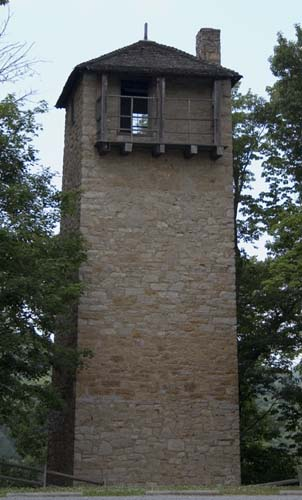
Shot Tower, Max Meadows

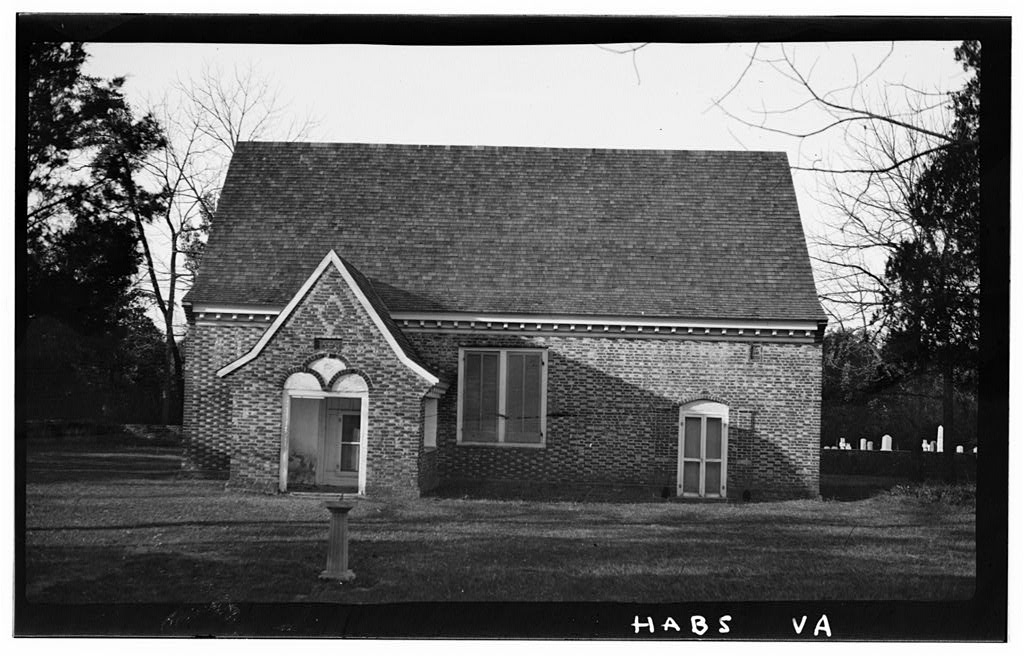
Yeocomico Church, Tucker Hill

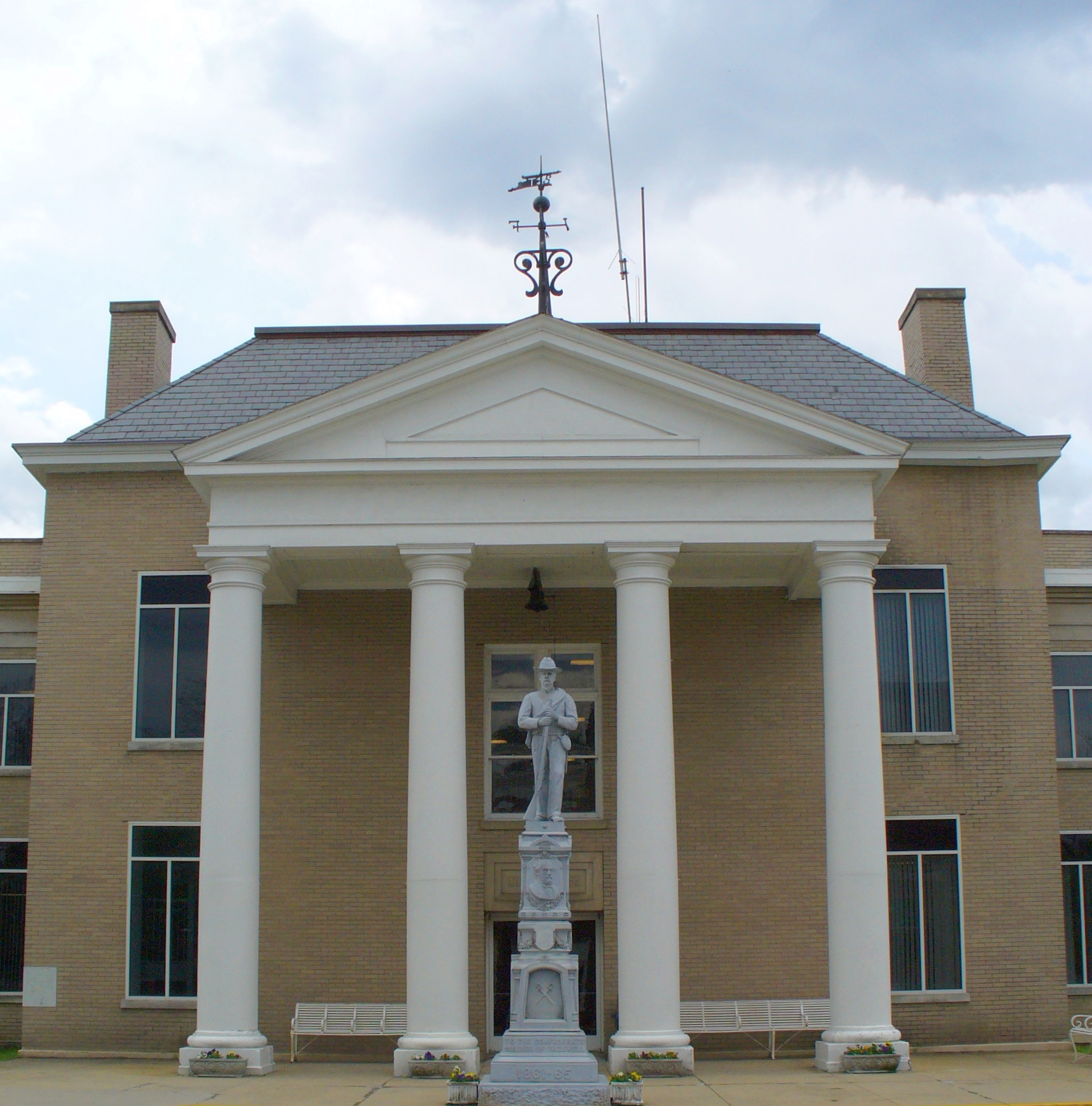
Tazewell County Courthouse, Tazewell Historic District, Tazewell

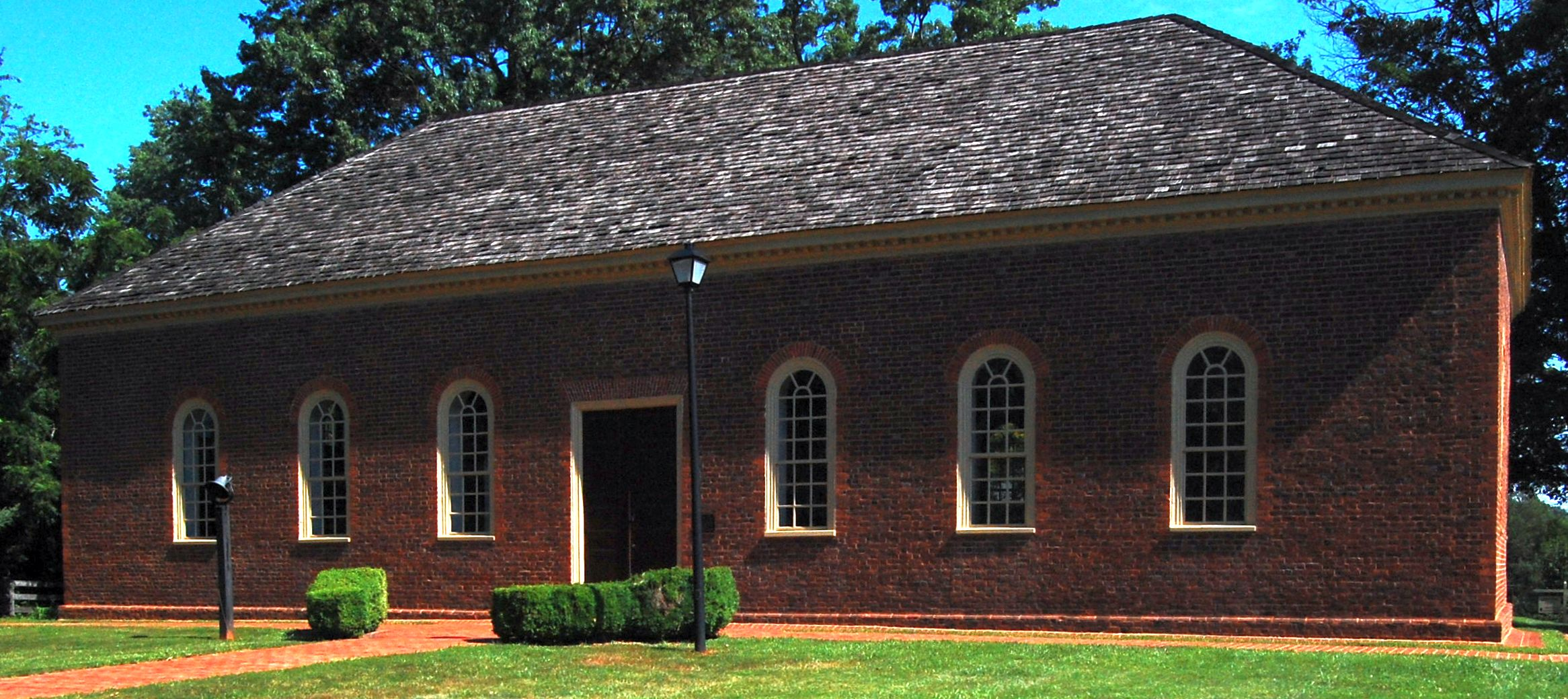
Little Fork Church, Rixeyville

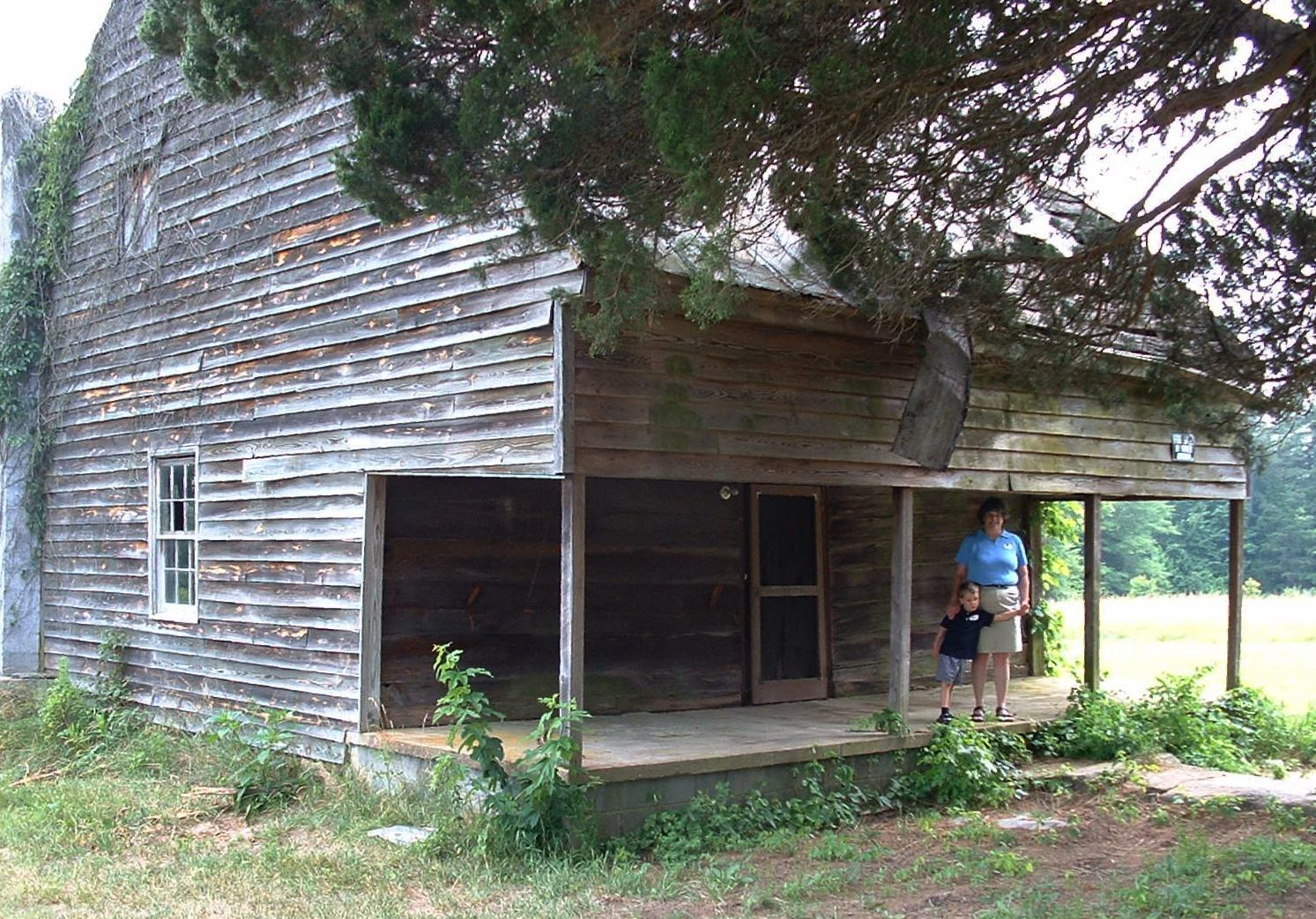
DeJarnette's Tavern, Nathalie

The following are approximate tallies of current listings by county and independent city. These counts are based on entries in the National Register Information Database as of April 24, 2008 and new weekly listings posted since then on the National Register of Historic Places web site. There are frequent additions to the listings and occasional delistings and the counts here are approximate and not official. The counts in this table exclude boundary increase and decrease listings which modify the area covered by an existing property or district and which carry a separate National Register reference number.

	County/City	# of Sites
1	Accomack	31
2	Albemarle	105
3	Alexandria (city)	52
4	Alleghany	14
5	Amelia	10
6	Amherst	38
7	Appomattox	8
8	Arlington	71
9	Augusta	61
10	Bath	27
11	Bedford	37
12	Bland	4
13	Botetourt	31
14	Bristol (city)	13
15	Brunswick	12
16	Buchanan	1
17	Buckingham	12
18	Buena Vista (city)	7
19	Campbell	19
20	Caroline	22
21	Carroll	11
22	Charles City	31
23	Charlotte	20
24	Charlottesville (city)	70
25	Chesapeake (city)	10
26	Chesterfield	29
27	Clarke	41
28	Colonial Heights (city)	8
29	Covington (city)	5
30	Craig	6
31	Culpeper	29
32	Cumberland	17
33	Danville (city)	24
34	Dickenson	1
35	Dinwiddie	19
36	Emporia (city)	7
37	Essex	19
38	Fairfax	69
39	Fairfax (city)	6
40	Falls Church (city)	6
41	Fauquier	72
42	Floyd	11
43	Fluvanna	18
44	Franklin	26
45	Franklin (city)	5
46	Frederick	32
47	Fredericksburg (city)	29
48	Galax (city)	5
49	Giles	11
50	Gloucester	35
51	Goochland	25
52	Grayson	8
53	Greene	9
54	Greensville	3
55	Halifax	41
56	Hampton (city)	30
57	Hanover	47
58	Harrisonburg (city)	14
59	Henrico	36
60	Henry	19
61	Highland	9
62	Hopewell (city)	9
63	Isle Of Wight	21
64	James City	19
65	King and Queen	17
66	King George	15
67	King William	22
68	Lancaster	13
69	Lee	10
70	Lexington (city)	18
71	Loudoun	101
72	Louisa	23
73	Lunenburg	11
74	Lynchburg (city)	59
75	Madison	22
76	Manassas (city)	7
77	Manassas Park (city)	2
78	Martinsville (city)	8
79	Mathews	16
80	Mecklenburg	29
81	Middlesex	18
82	Montgomery	71
83	Nelson	31
84	New Kent	18
85	Newport News (city)	39
86	Norfolk (city)	65
87	Northampton	30
88	Northumberland	27
89	Norton (city)	1
90	Nottoway	12
91	Orange	36
92	Page	33
93	Patrick	13
94	Petersburg (city)	46
95	Pittsylvania	24
96	Poquoson (city)	0
97	Portsmouth (city)	24
98	Powhatan	21
99	Prince Edward	16
100	Prince George	10
101	Prince William	45
102	Pulaski	25
103	Radford (city)	8
104	Rappahannock	19
105	Richmond	10
106	Richmond (city)	232
107	Roanoke	13
108	Roanoke (city)	59
109	Rockbridge	52
110	Rockingham	45
111	Russell	11
112	Salem (city)	19
113	Scott	10
114	Shenandoah	41
115	Smyth	24
116	Southampton	19
117	Spotsylvania	17
118	Stafford	21
119	Staunton (city)	37
120	Suffolk (city)	27
121	Surry	20
122	Sussex	10
123	Tazewell	23
124	Virginia Beach (city)	37
125	Warren	25
126	Washington	17
127	Waynesboro (city)	11
128	Westmoreland	26
129	Williamsburg (city)	15
130	Winchester (city)	23
131	Wise	21
132	Wythe	22
133	York	12
(duplicates)		(69)
Total:		3,373

== Gallery ==
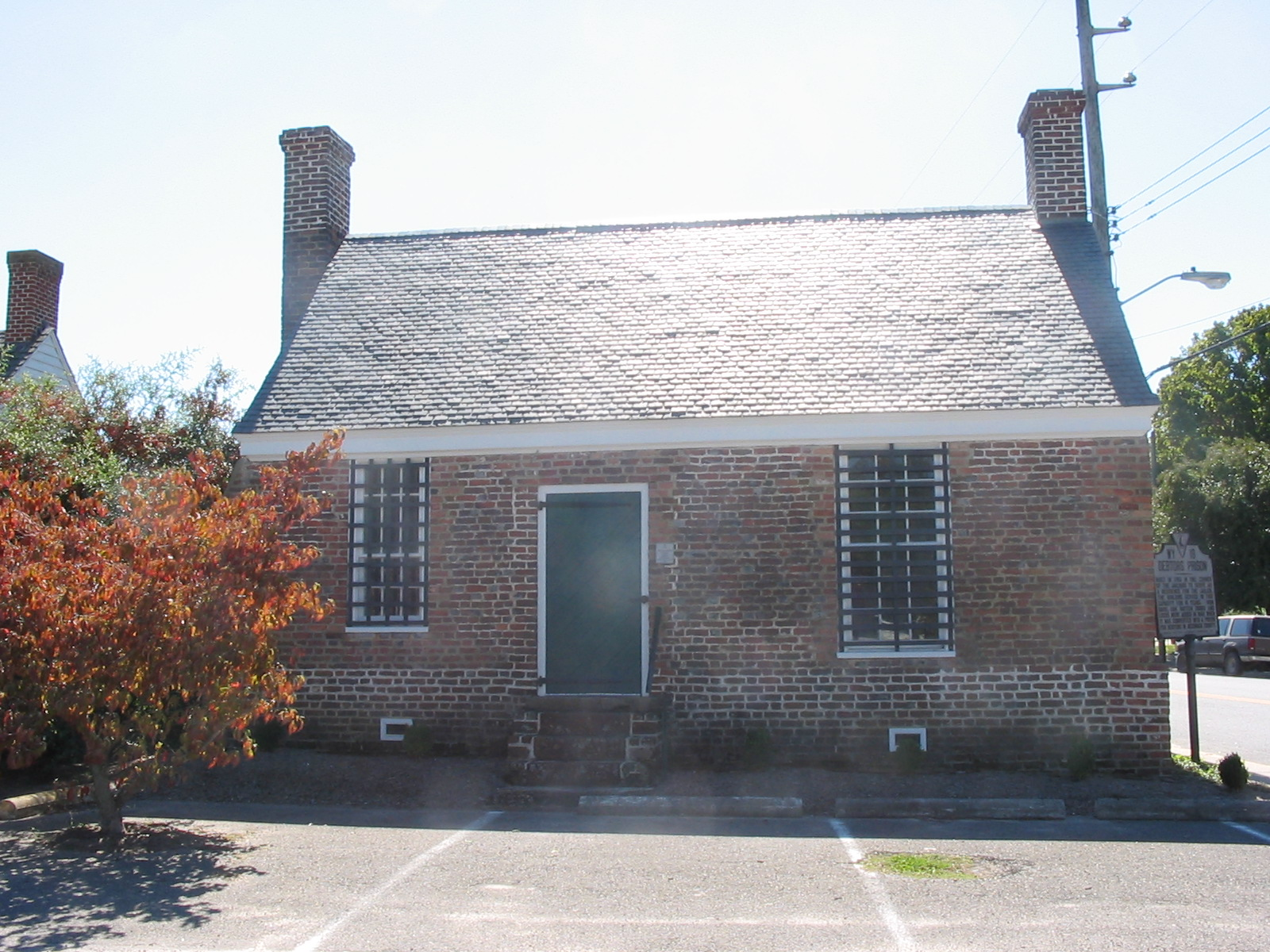
Debtors' Prison, Accomac

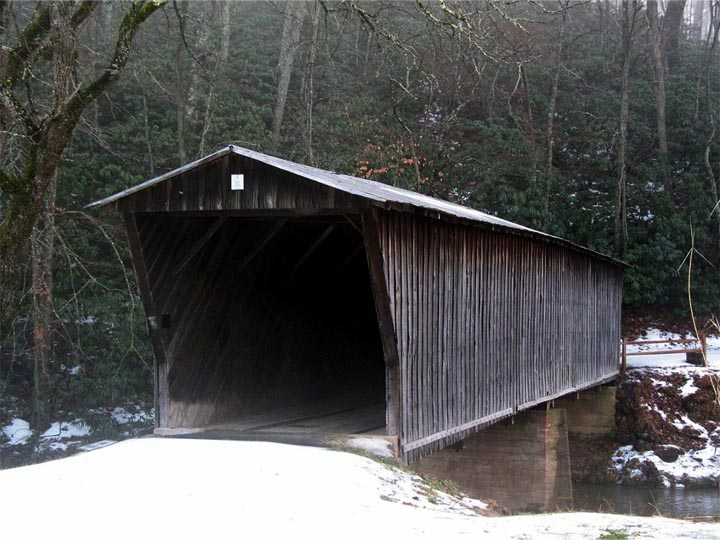
Bob White Covered Bridge, Woolwine

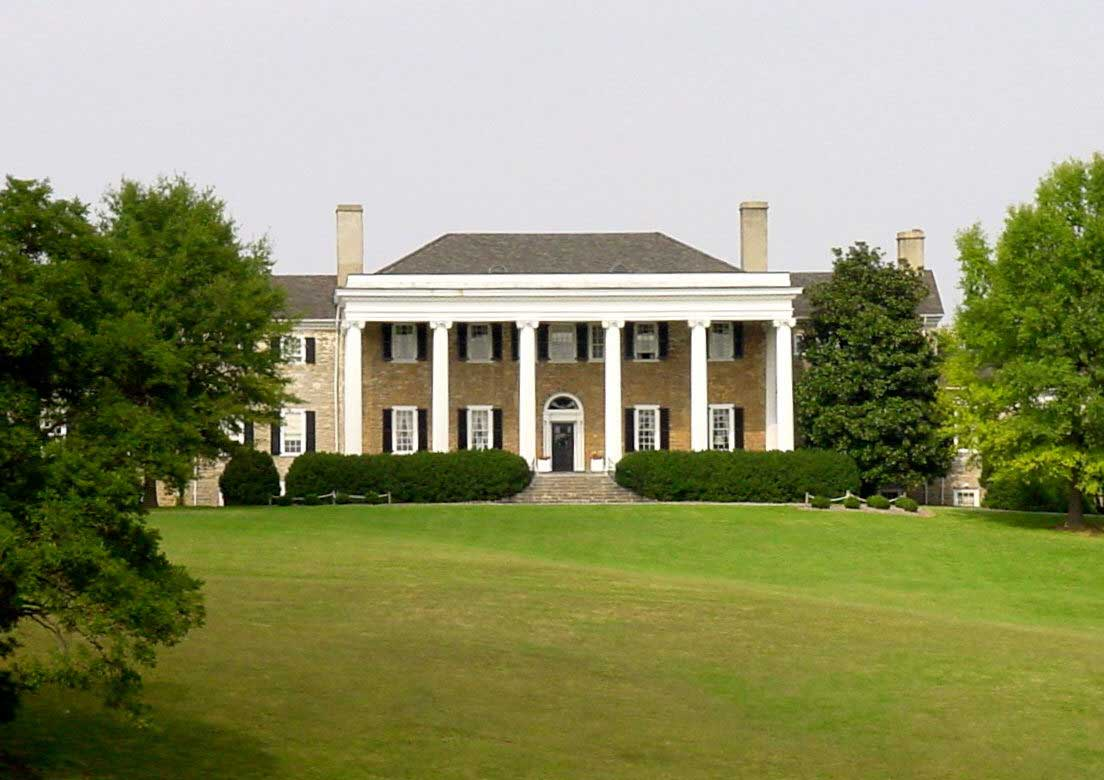
Carter Hall, Millwood

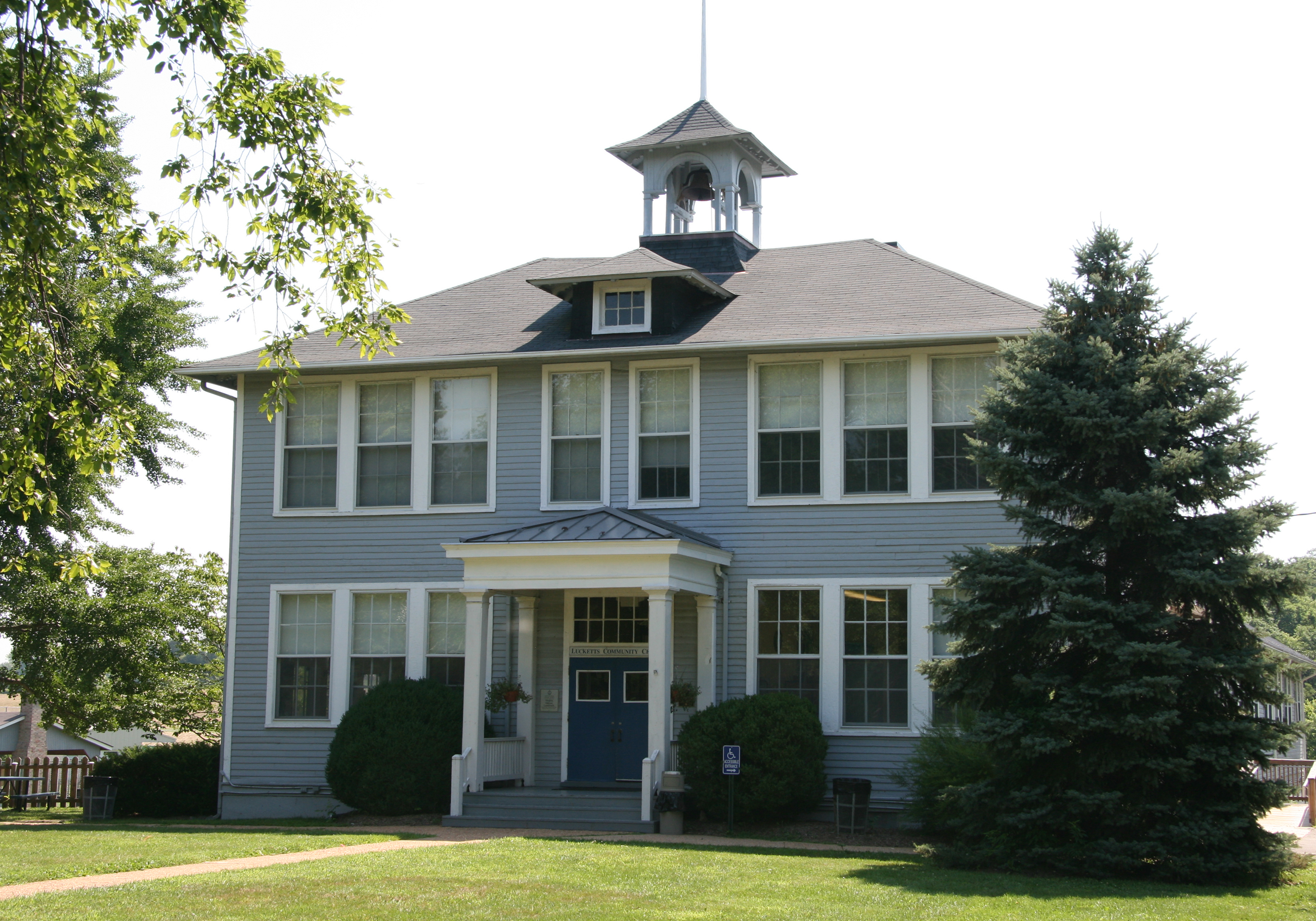
Lucketts School, Leesburg

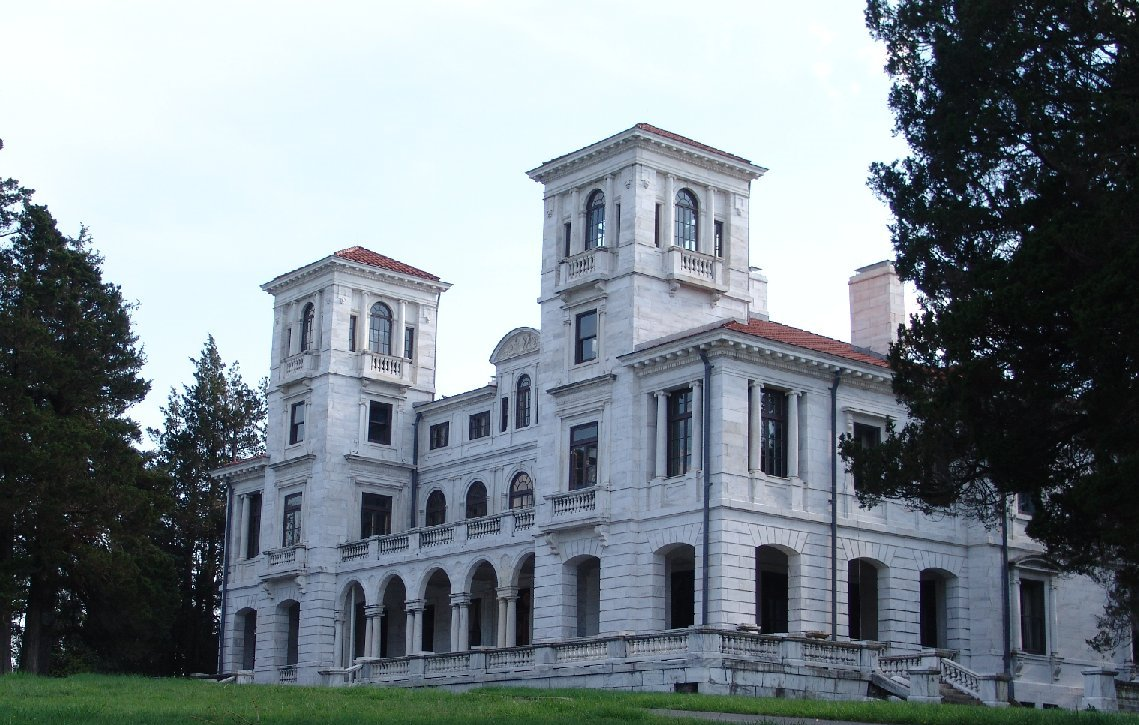
Swannanoa, Waynesboro

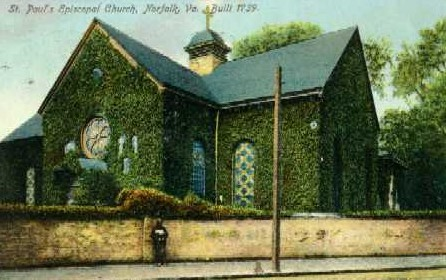
Saint Paul's Episcopal Church, Norfolk

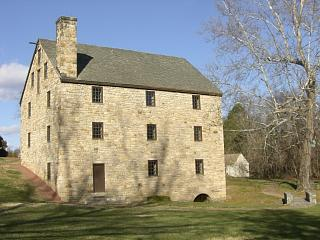
George Washington's Gristmill, Lorton

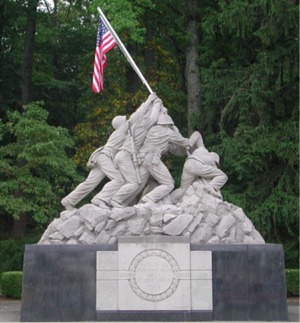
Quantico Marine Corps Base Historic District, Quantico

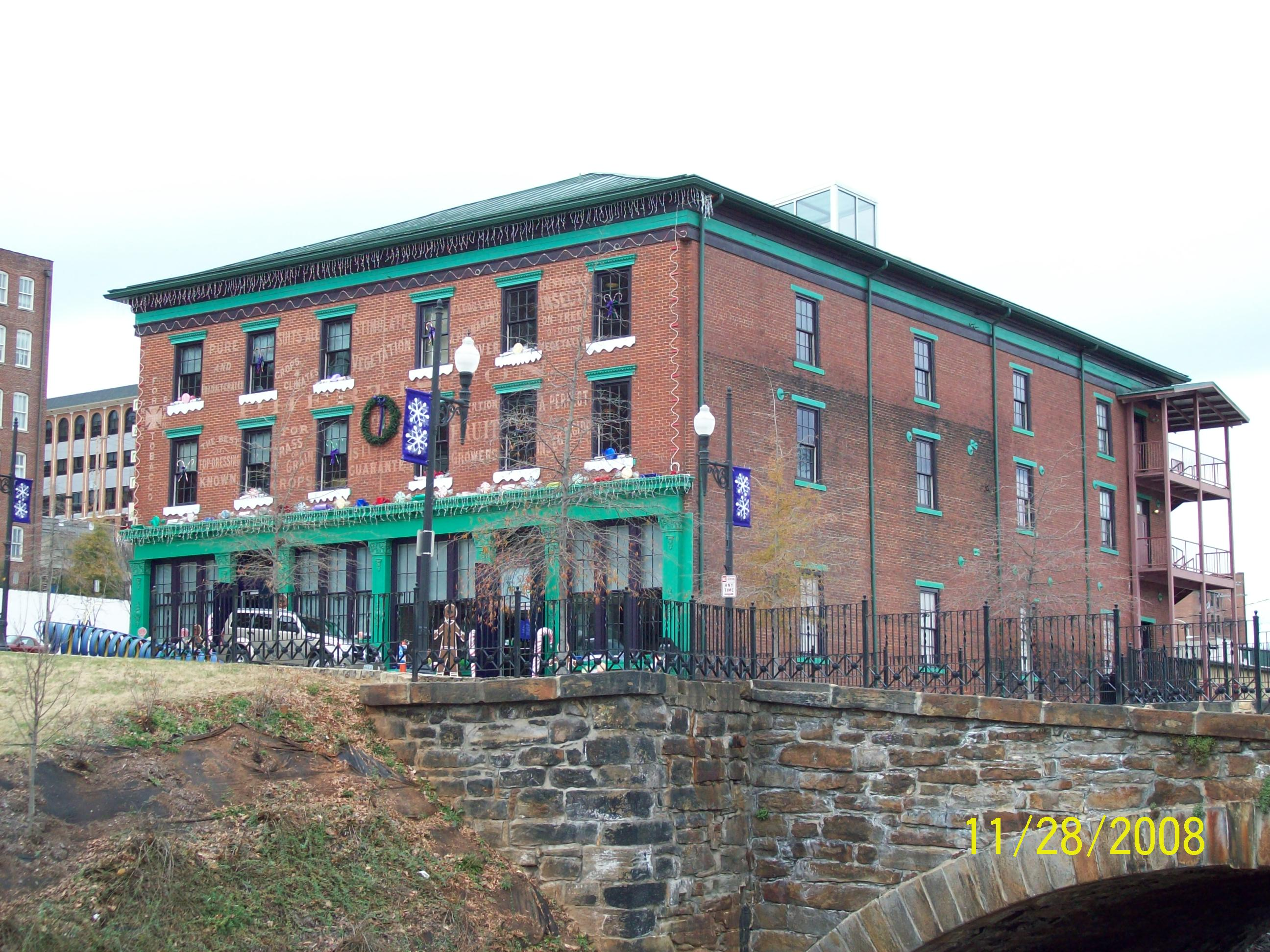
J. W. Wood Building, Lynchburg

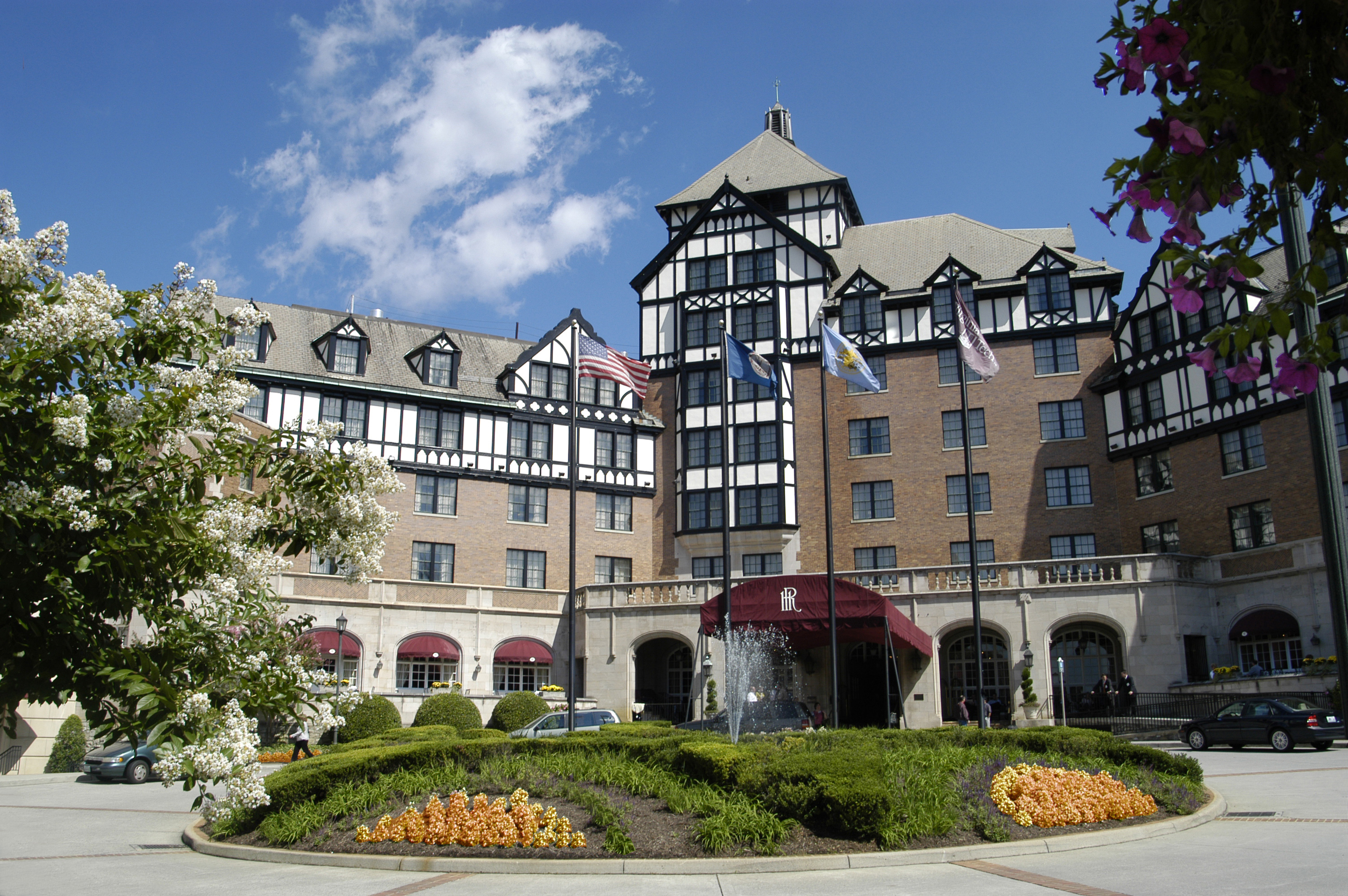
Hotel Roanoke, Roanoke

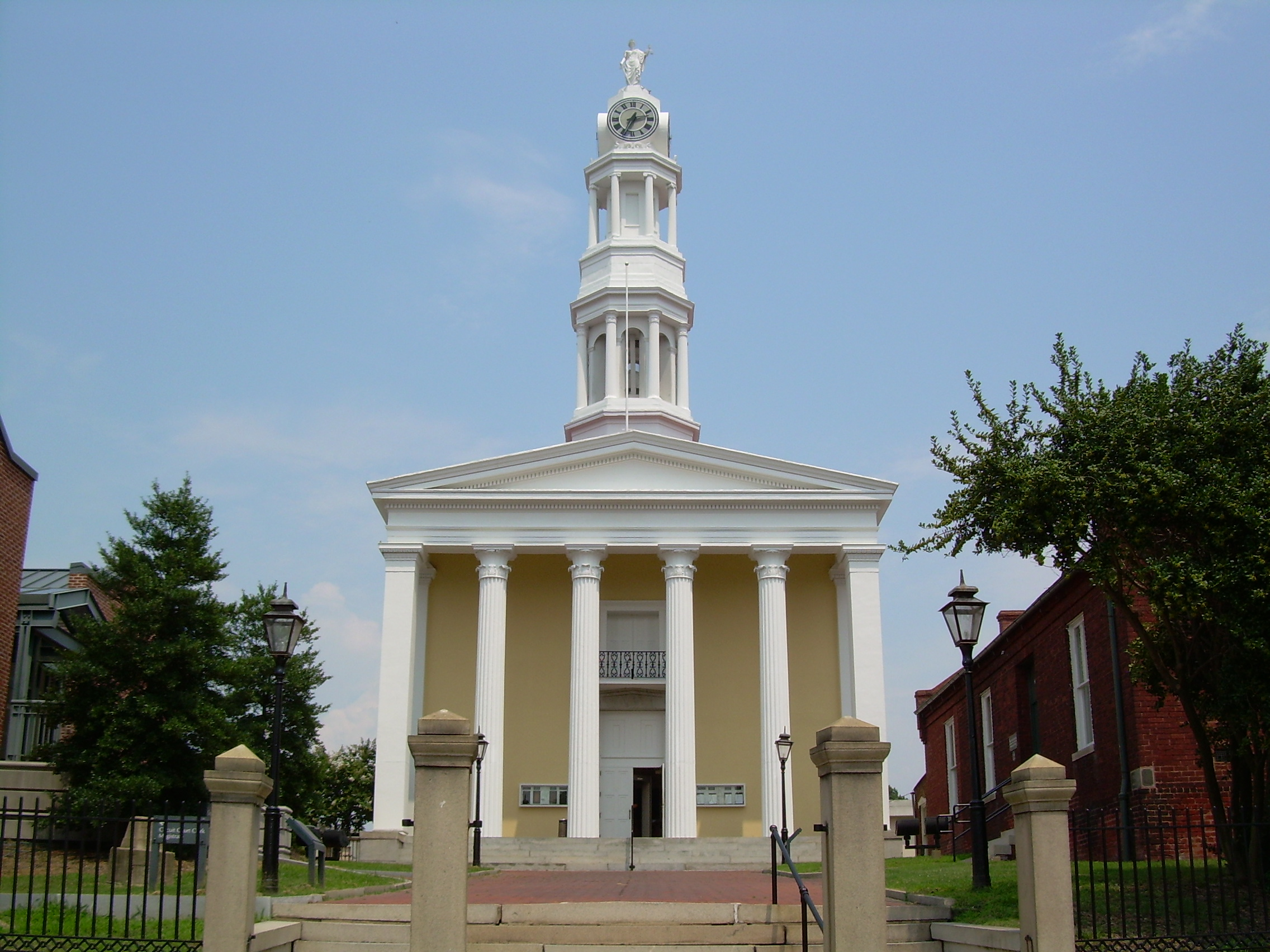
Petersburg Courthouse, Petersburg

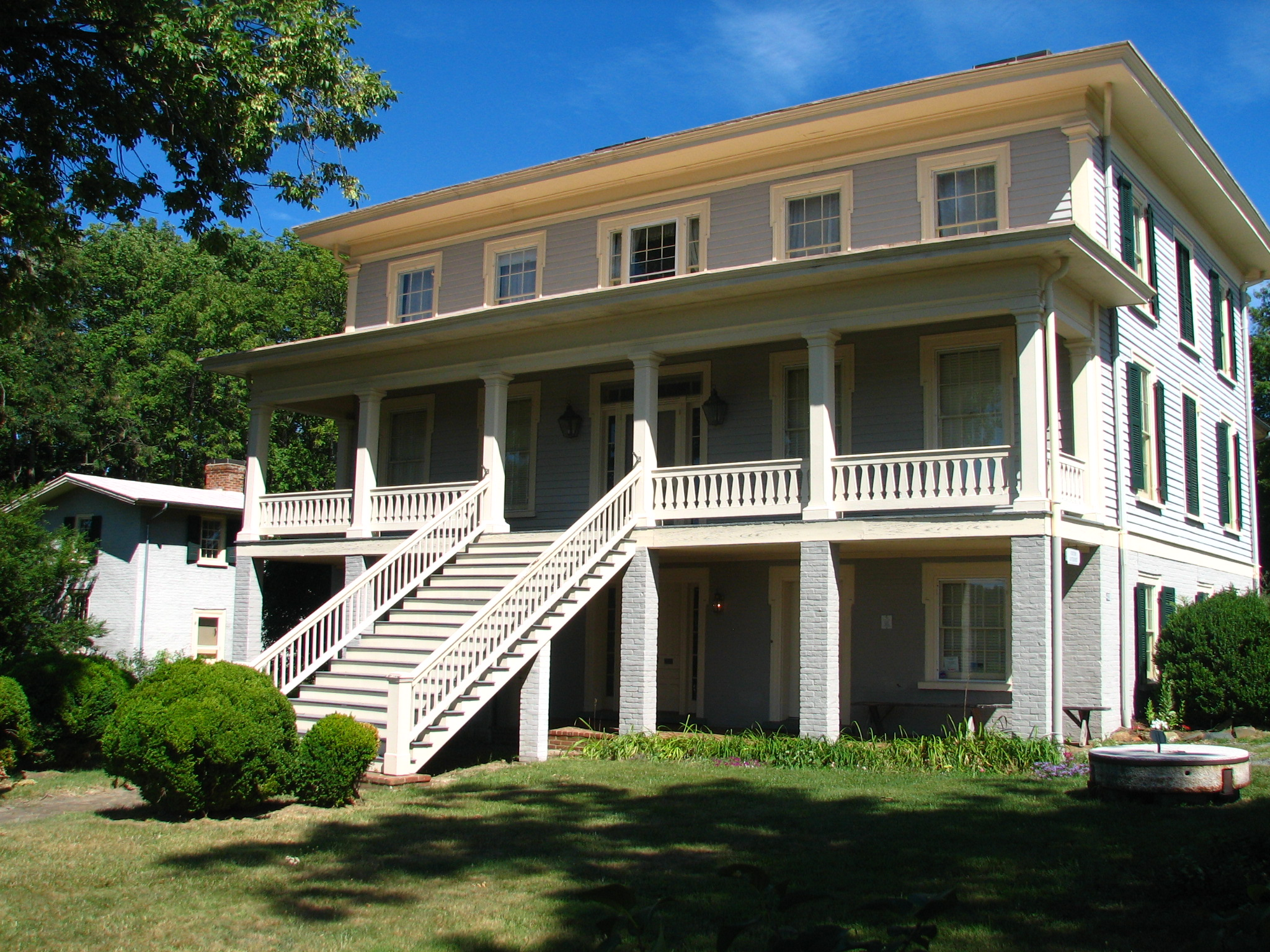
Exchange Hotel, Gordonsville

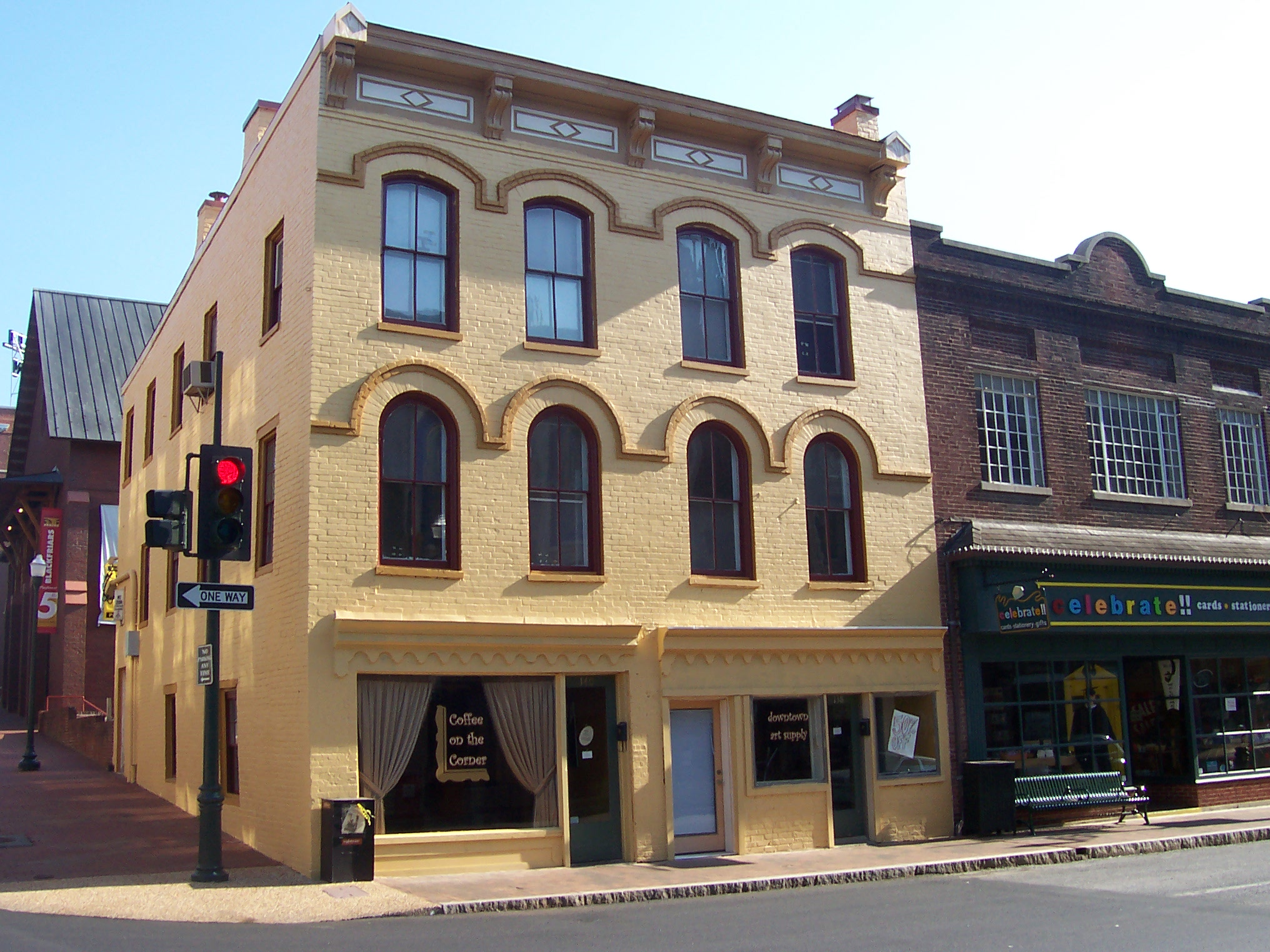
Beverley Historic District, Staunton

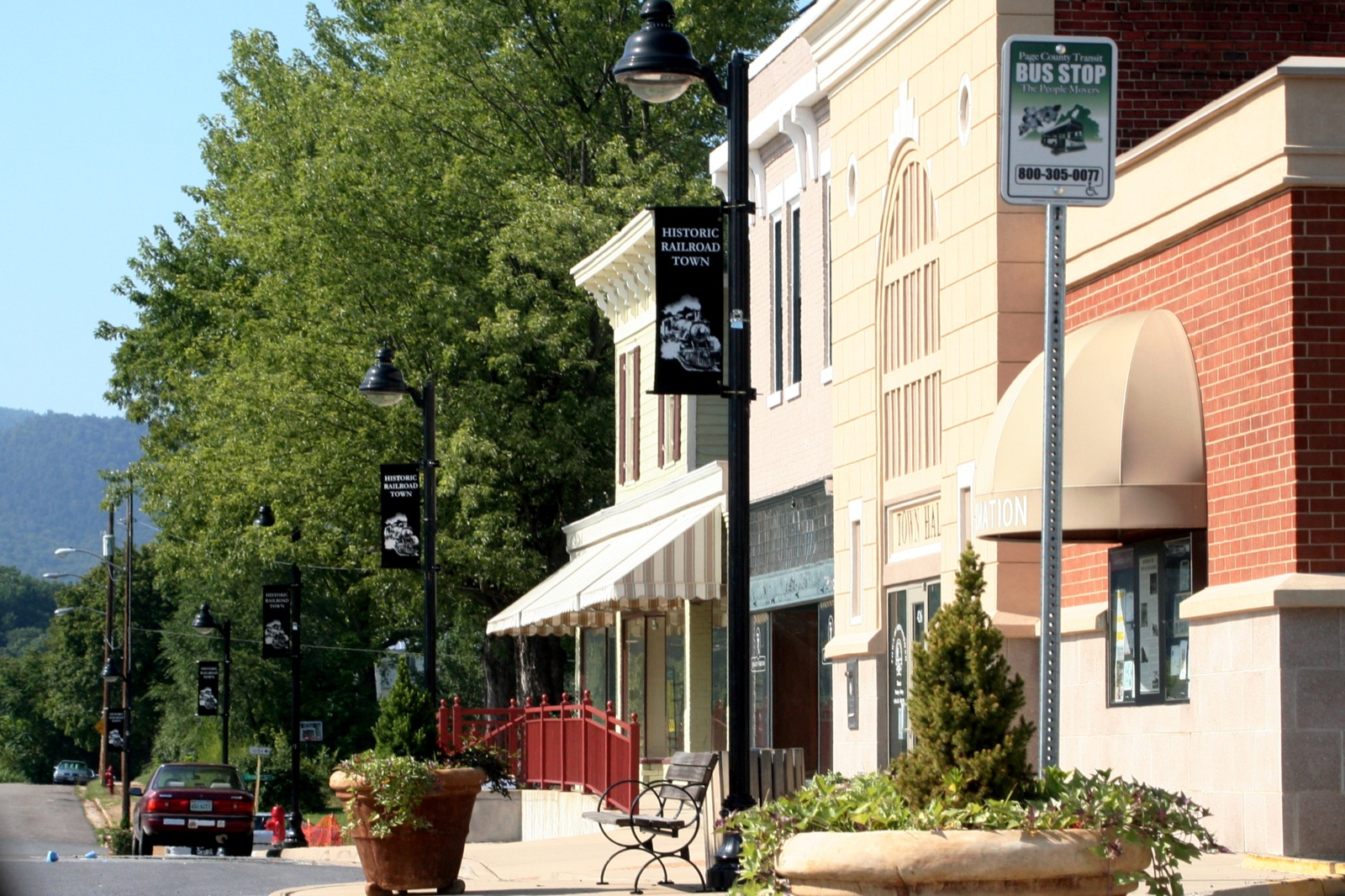
Shenandoah Historic District, Shenandoah

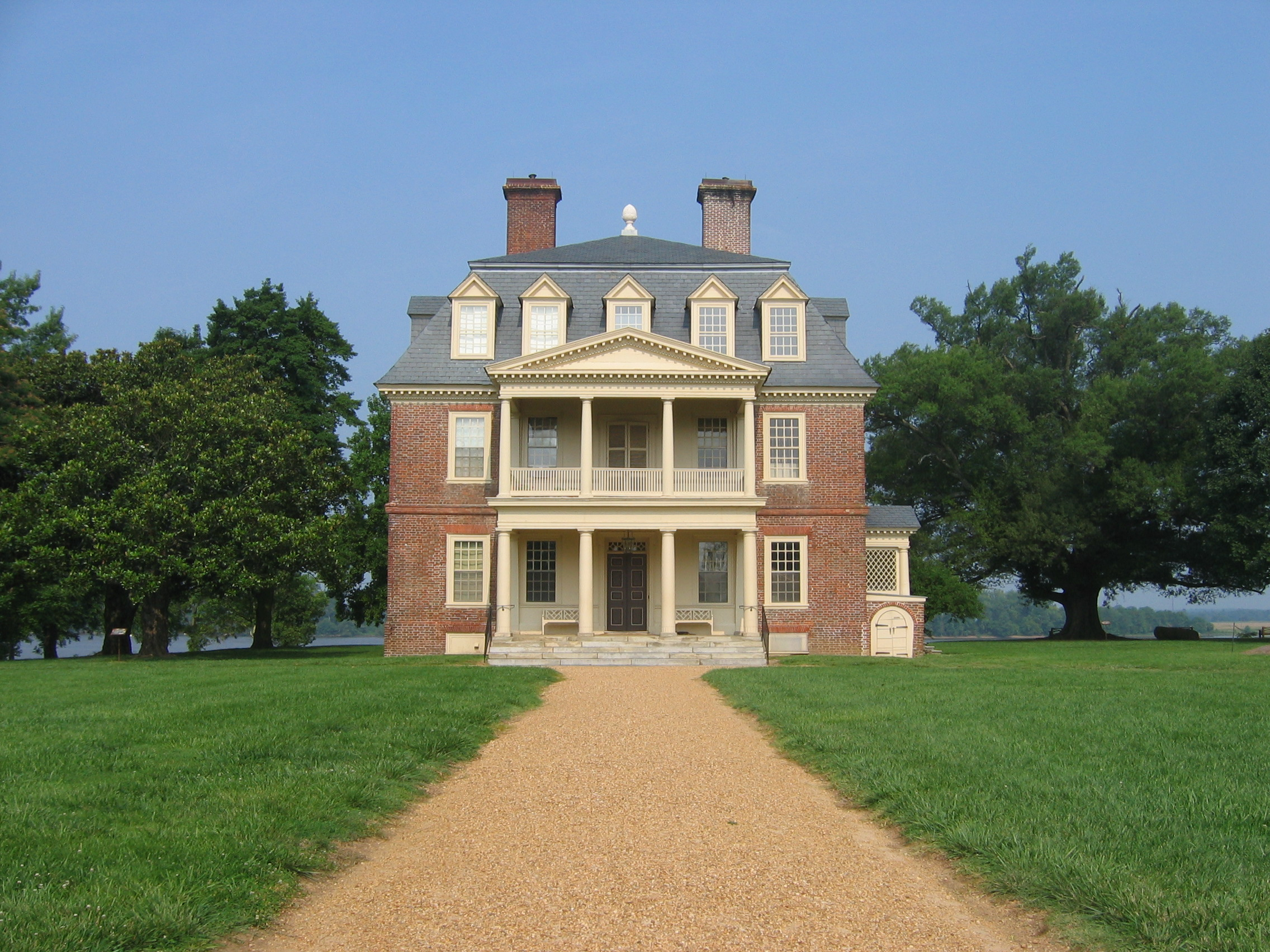
Shirley Plantation, Hopewell

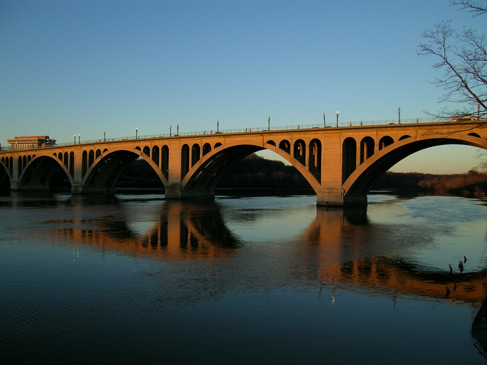
Francis Scott Key Bridge, Arlington

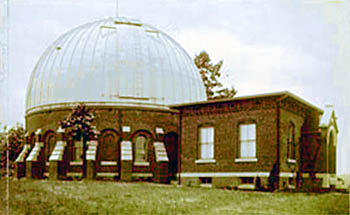
Leander McCormick Observatory, Charlottesville

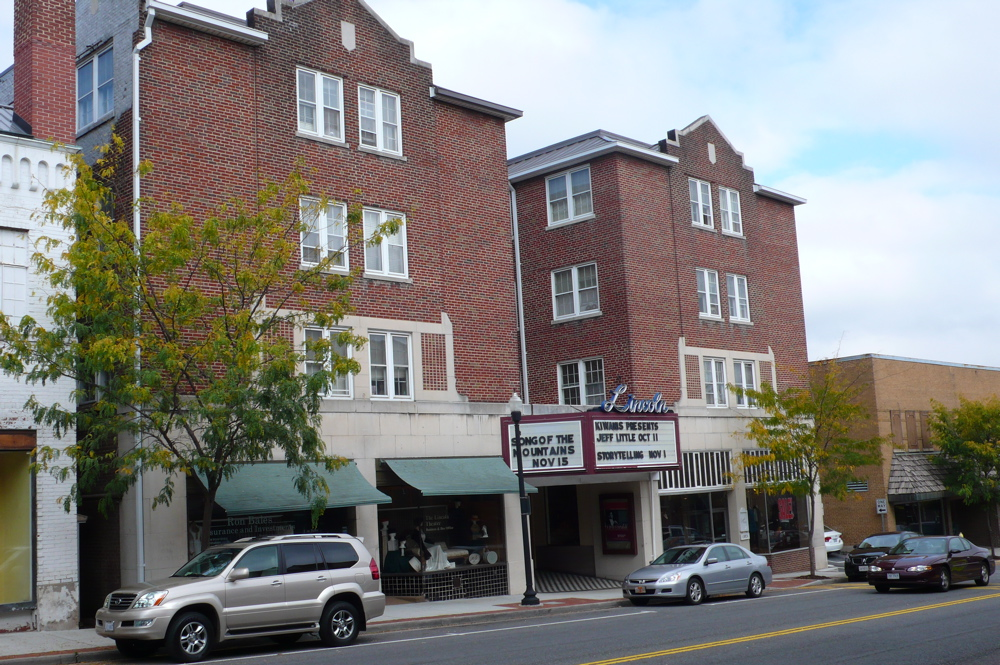
Lincoln Theatre, Marion

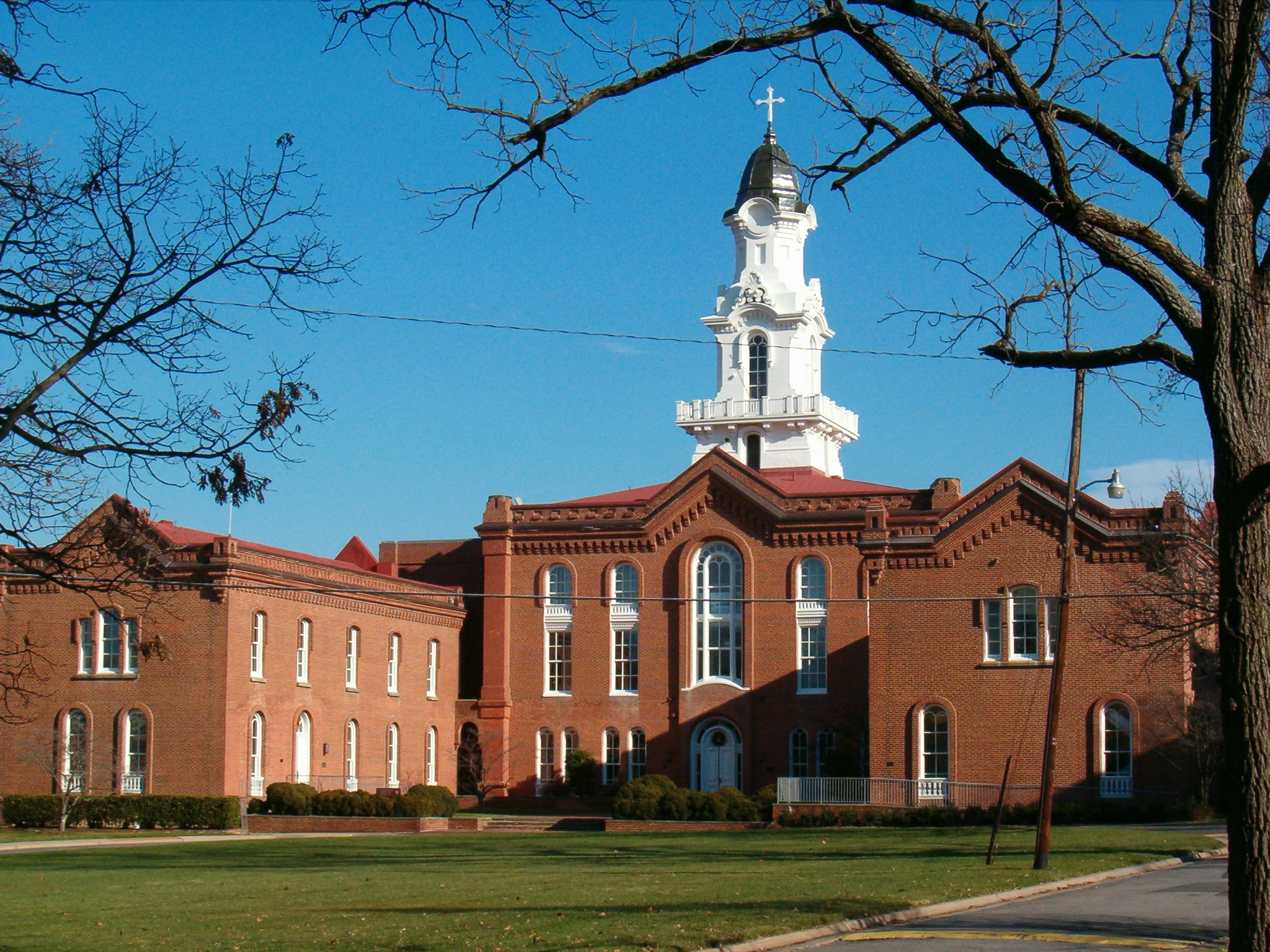
Protestant Episcopal Theological Seminary, Alexandria

== See also ==
- Association for the Preservation of Virginia Antiquities
- List of historic houses in Virginia
- List of historical societies in Virginia
- List of National Historic Landmarks in Virginia
- List of bridges on the National Register of Historic Places in Virginia
- Virginia Landmarks Register
