= National Register of Historic Places listings in Covington, Virginia =

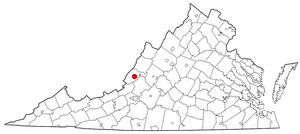
Location of Covington in Virginia

This is a list of the National Register of Historic Places listings in Covington, Virginia.

This is intended to be a complete list of the properties and districts on the National Register of Historic Places in the independent city of Covington, Virginia, United States. The locations of National Register properties and districts for which the latitude and longitude coordinates are included below, may be seen in an online map.

There are 5 properties and districts listed on the National Register in the city.

This National Park Service list is complete through NPS recent listings posted February 6, 2026.

== Current listings ==
	Name on the Register	Image	Date listed	Location	Description
1	Covington High School	Covington High School	May 15, 2008 (#08000417)	530 S. Lexington Ave. 37°47′03″N 79°59′31″W	
2	Covington Historic District	Covington Historic District	February 21, 1991 (#91000099)	Roughly bounded by the Jackson River, Monroe Ave., CSX railroad tracks, and Maple Ave. 37°47′32″N 79°59′45″W	
3	First Baptist Church of Covington, Virginia	First Baptist Church of Covington, Virginia	January 24, 2002 (#01001518)	337 S. Lexington Ave. 37°47′11″N 79°59′35″W	
4	Fudge House	Fudge House	April 29, 1993 (#93000348)	620 Parklin Dr. 37°46′42″N 79°59′33″W	
5	Rivermont School		May 26, 2022 (#100007754)	1011 North Rockbridge Ave. 37°48′16″N 79°59′19″W	

== See also ==
- List of National Historic Landmarks in Virginia
- National Register of Historic Places listings in Virginia
- National Register of Historic Places listings in Alleghany County, Virginia
