= National Register of Historic Places listings in Dickenson County, Virginia =

Location of Dickenson County in Virginia

This is a list of the National Register of Historic Places listings in Dickenson County, Virginia.

This is intended to be a detailed table of the property on the National Register of Historic Places in Dickenson County, Virginia, United States. The locations of National Register properties and districts for which the latitude and longitude coordinates are included below may be seen in a Google map.

There is 1 property listed on the National Register in the county.

This National Park Service list is complete through NPS recent listings posted March 6, 2026.

== Current listings ==
	Name on the Register	Image	Date listed	Location	City or town	Description
1	Dickenson County Courthouse	Dickenson County Courthouse	September 16, 1982 (#82004553)	Main and McClure Sts. 37°09′01″N 82°27′24″W	Clintwood	

== See also ==
- List of National Historic Landmarks in Virginia
- National Register of Historic Places listings in Virginia
