= Mountain Glen =

Historic house in Virginia, United States

- U.S. National Register of Historic Places
- Virginia Landmarks Register
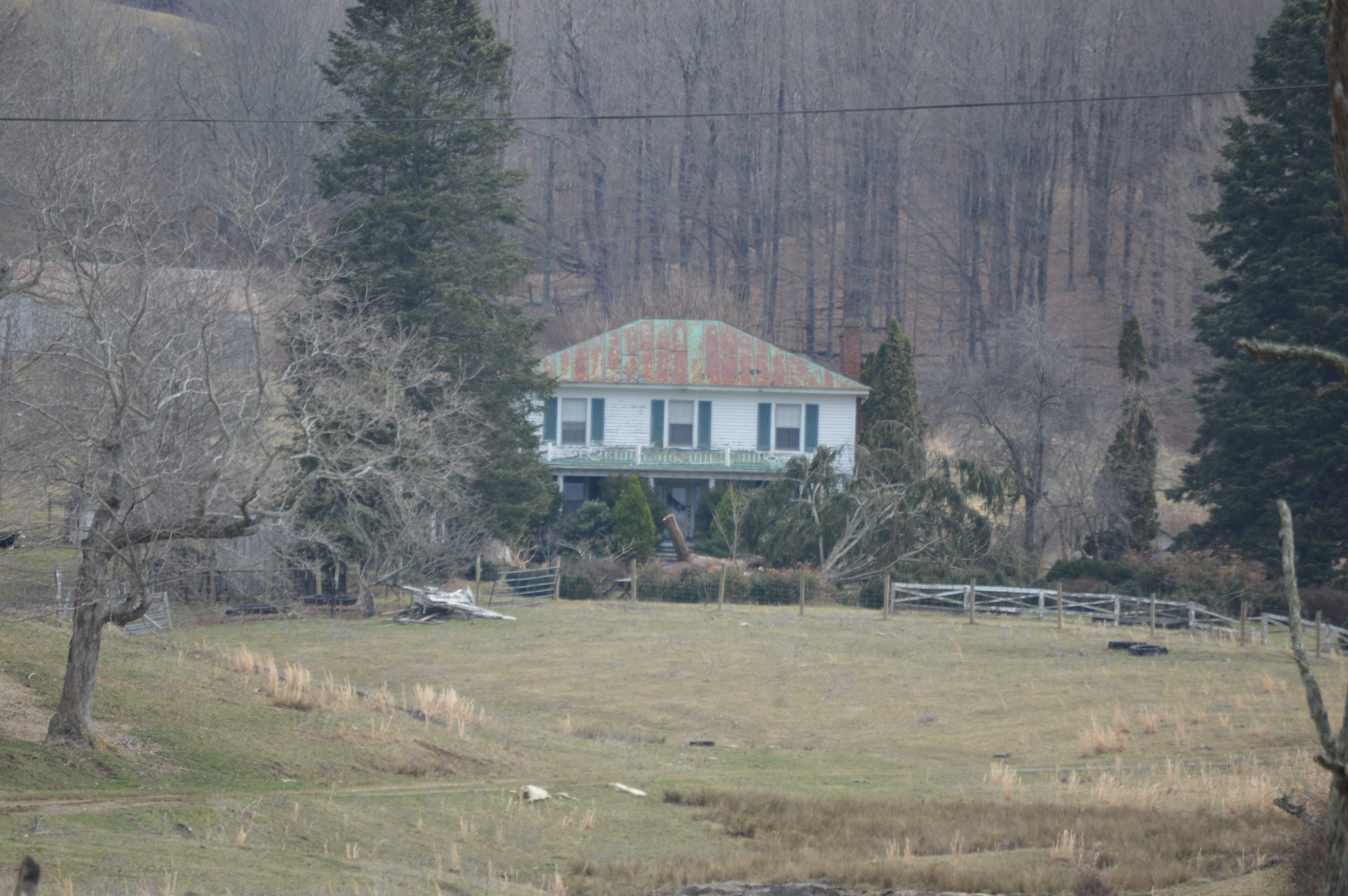
- Roadside view of the farmhouse

- Location within Virginia Location within the United States
- Location: 1 mile (1.6 km) southeast of Ceres, near Ceres, Virginia
- Coordinates: 37°0′12.5″N 81°19′48″W
- Area: 2.5 acres (1.0 ha)
- Built by: John Lock
- Architectural style: Central-passage plan
- NRHP reference No.: 90002161
- VLR No.: 010-0039

Significant dates
- Added to NRHP: January 24, 1991
- Designated VLR: August 15, 1989

Mountain Glen, also known as the Repass-Hudson House, is a historic home located near Ceres, Bland County, Virginia. It was built in the mid- to-late- 1850s, and is a large, two-story, three bay frame house of the double-pile, central-passage form. It has a hipped roof and a full-width front porch added about 1910.

It was listed on the National Register of Historic Places in 1990.
