= Louisiana Brigade Winter Camp =

United States historic place

- U.S. National Register of Historic Places
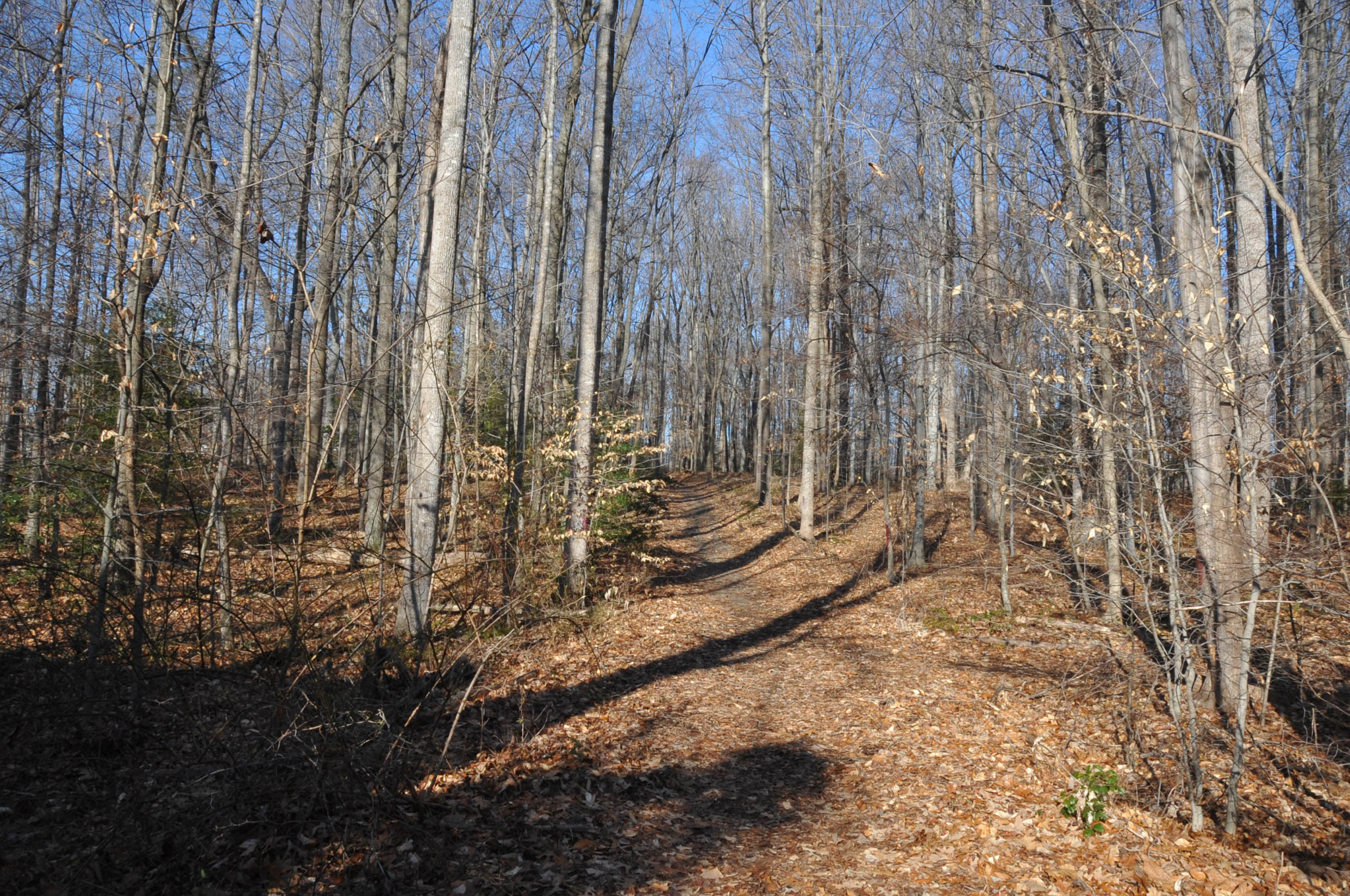
- Little is left of the site
- Nearest city: Manassas Park, Virginia
- Area: 7.8 acres (3.2 ha)
- Built: 1861
- MPS: Civil War Properties in Prince William County MPS
- NRHP reference No.: 89001912
- Added to NRHP: November 16, 1989

The Louisiana Brigade Winter Camp, also known as Camp Carondelet, was the site of an American Civil War military camp during the winter of 1861–62. It is located east of Manassas Park, Virginia and about 1 mile (1.6 km) south of Bull Run. The site was used by five battalions of Louisiana soldiers of the Confederate Army, whose distinctive buttons (bearing a pelican emblem) have long been found by relic hunters. Obvious remnants of the camp include the remains of 25 huts, some of which have been damaged or destroyed by road-building activity through the site, and chimneys representing the locations of an estimated 50 more.

The camp location was listed on the National Register of Historic Places in 1989.
