= Craig Healing Springs =

- U.S. National Register of Historic Places
- Virginia Landmarks Register
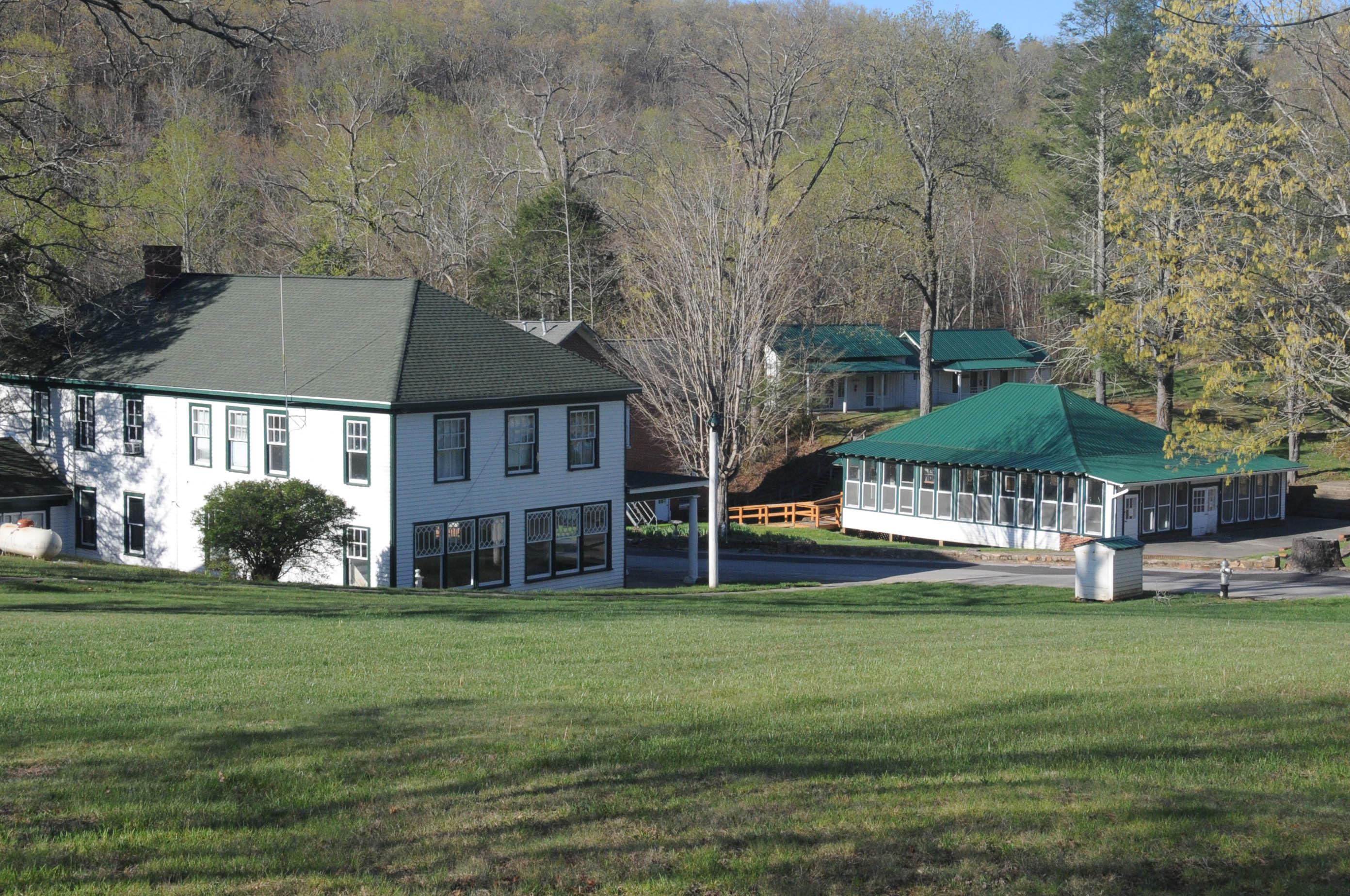
- Overview

- Location within Virginia Location within the United States
- Location: Dicks Creek Road, Craig Springs, Craig County, near New Castle, Virginia
- Coordinates: 37.484698°N 80.291849°W
- Area: 14 acres (5.7 ha)
- Built: 1909, 1935, 1960
- NRHP reference No.: 82004551
- VLR No.: 022-0004

Significant dates
- Added to NRHP: July 21, 1982
- Designated VLR: December 16, 1980

Craig Healing Springs, also known as the Craig Springs Conference Grounds, is a historic resort property located at Craig Springs, Craig County, west of New Castle, Virginia. It encompasses 23 contributing buildings and 1 contributing structure associated with the Craig Healing Springs resort. They include mostly frame resort cottages in addition to the two-story, brick Oak Lodge (c. 1935). It contains guest rooms and the facilities for the healing baths. The core of the complex is the building known as "Central," which contained guest registration, rooms, and the kitchen and dining facilities. The property also includes a former dance pavilion, used as an assembly hall. A gazebo marks the location of the springs and stands northwest of the dance pavilion. The resort was incorporated in 1909, and the health spa-resort complex flourished with the advent of automobile travel in the years between the two world wars. It declined in popularity in the 1950s, and was purchased in 1960, as a retreat and conference center for the Christian Church (Disciples of Christ) in Virginia.

It was listed on the National Register of Historic Places in 1982.

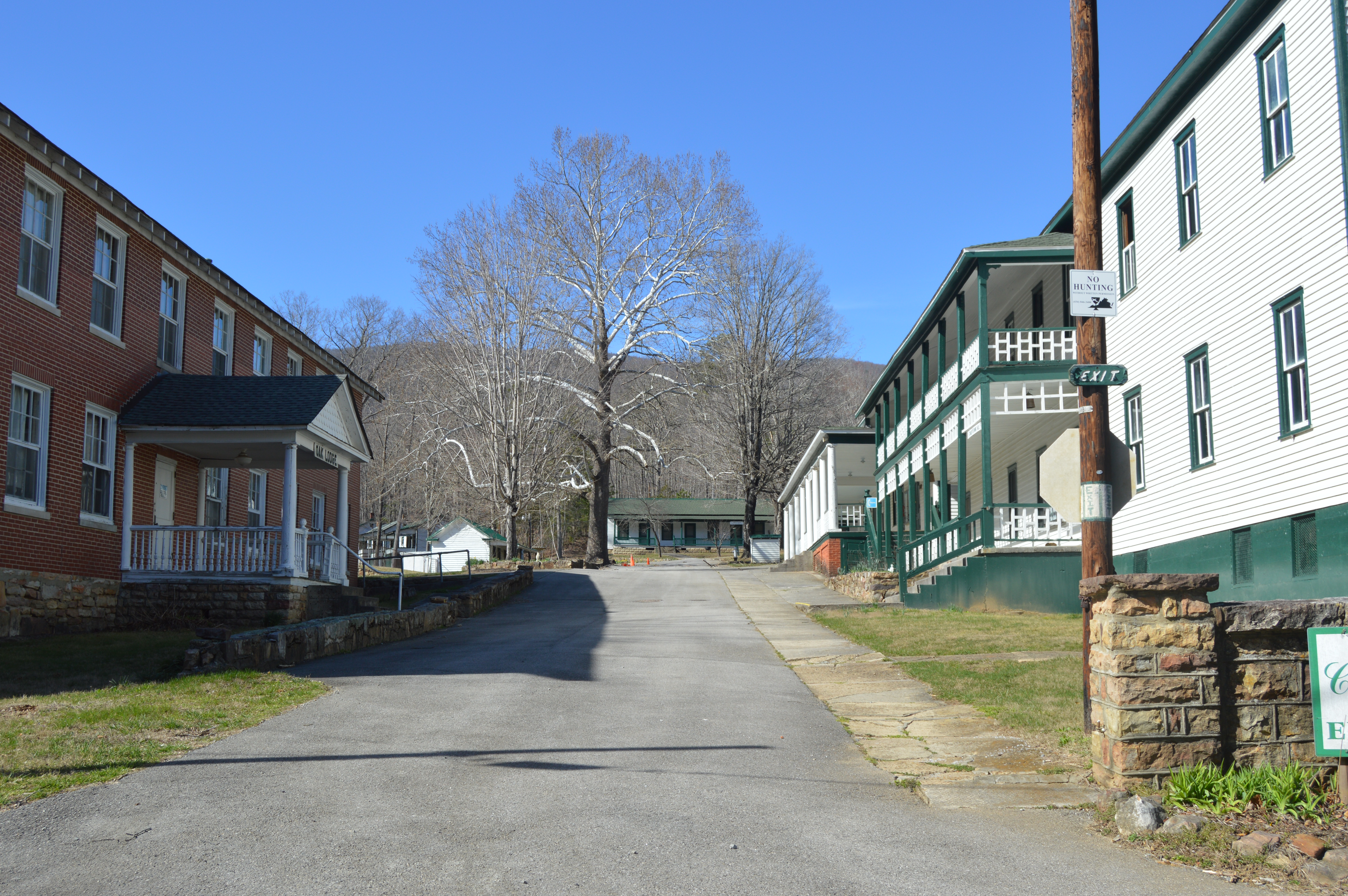
Buildings in the western section of the complex
