= Sharon Lutheran Church and Cemetery =

Historic site in Bland County, Virginia, US

- U.S. National Register of Historic Places
- Virginia Landmarks Register
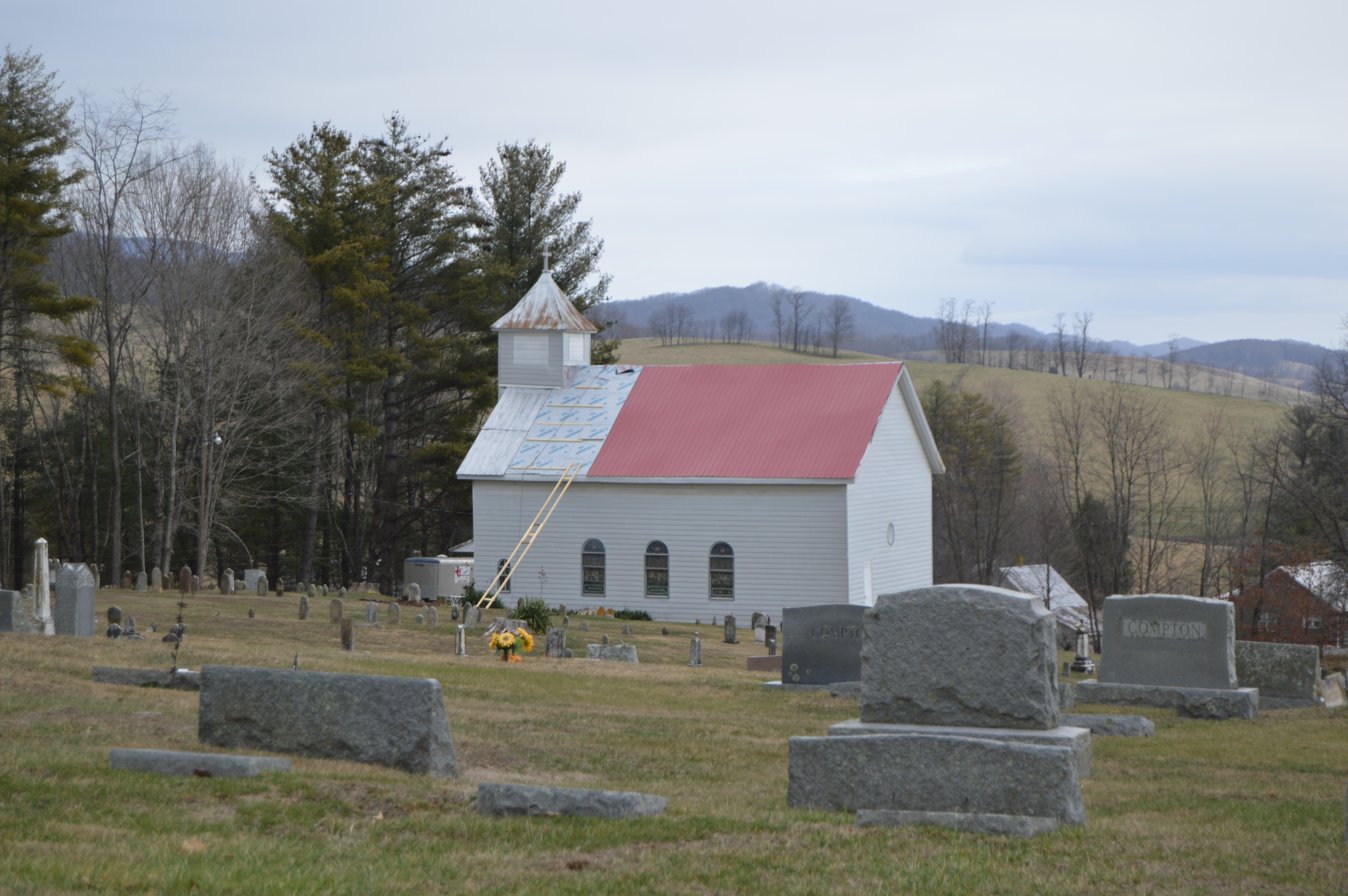
- Overview from the west

- Location within Virginia Location within the United States
- Location: West of Ceres on State Route 42, near Ceres, Virginia
- Coordinates: 37°00′58″N 81°20′56″W
- Area: 4 acres (1.6 ha)
- Built: 1817, 1883
- NRHP reference No.: 79003030
- VLR No.: 010-0040

Significant dates
- Added to NRHP: February 28, 1979
- Designated VLR: June 21, 1978

Sharon Lutheran Church and Cemetery is a historic Lutheran church and cemetery located near Ceres, Bland County, Virginia. The church was built in 1883, and is a one-story, frame church, four bays long, with round-arched, stained-glass windows and a gable roof. It features a projecting square tower with a bell-cast pyramidal roof and cross finial on the entrance facade. The adjacent cemetery was established in 1817, and includes a collection of rare Germanic gravestones which are stylistically related to those found in the outlying churches of the Wythe County German settlements.

It was listed on the National Register of Historic Places in 1979.
