= Junius Marcellus Updyke Farm =

Historic house in Virginia, United States

- U.S. National Register of Historic Places
- Virginia Landmarks Register
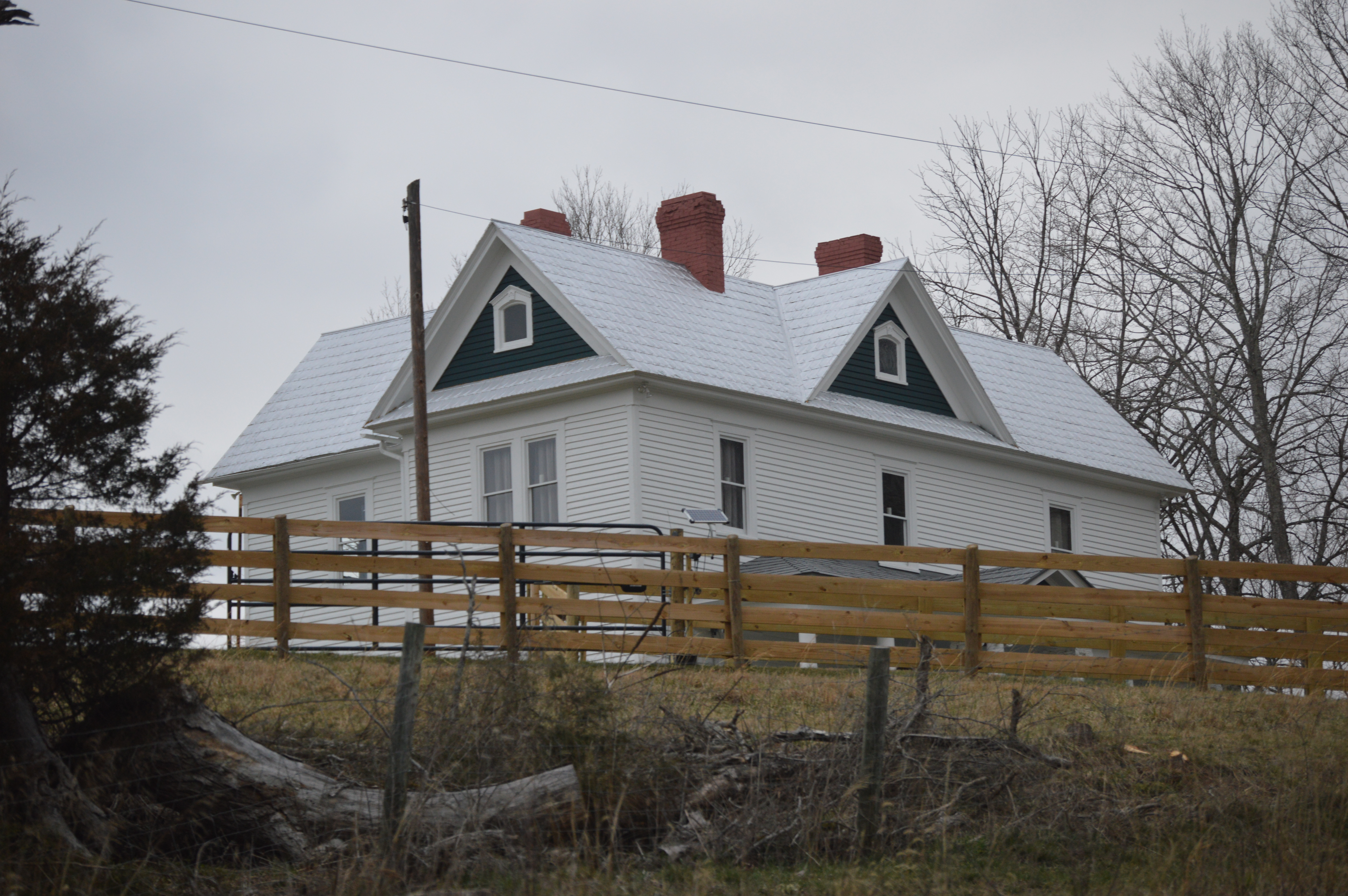
- Roadside view of the farmhouse

- Location within Virginia Location within the United States
- Location: 4859 E. Bluegrass Trail, near Bland, Virginia
- Coordinates: 37°7′31″N 81°0′59″W
- Area: 361.81 acres (146.42 ha)
- Built: c. 1912
- NRHP reference No.: 12000018
- VLR No.: 010-5027

Significant dates
- Added to NRHP: February 8, 2012
- Designated VLR: December 15, 2011

Junius Marcellus Updyke Farm is a historic home and farm located near Bland, Bland County, Virginia. The house was built about 1910, and is a two-story, three-bay, single-pile, I-house, with a two-story rear ell to its rear. It also has a one-story wing and porch. It has a gable roof with pent roofs at the ends and a full-width front porch supported by Ionic order columns. Also on the property are a contributing two-story smokehouse (c. 1910), granary (c. 1910), chicken house (c. 1920), storage shed (c. 1910), barn (c. 1955), and family cemetery.

It was listed on the National Register of Historic Places in 2012.
