= New Castle Historic District (New Castle, Virginia) =

Historic district in Virginia, United States

- U.S. National Register of Historic Places
- U.S. Historic district
- Virginia Landmarks Register
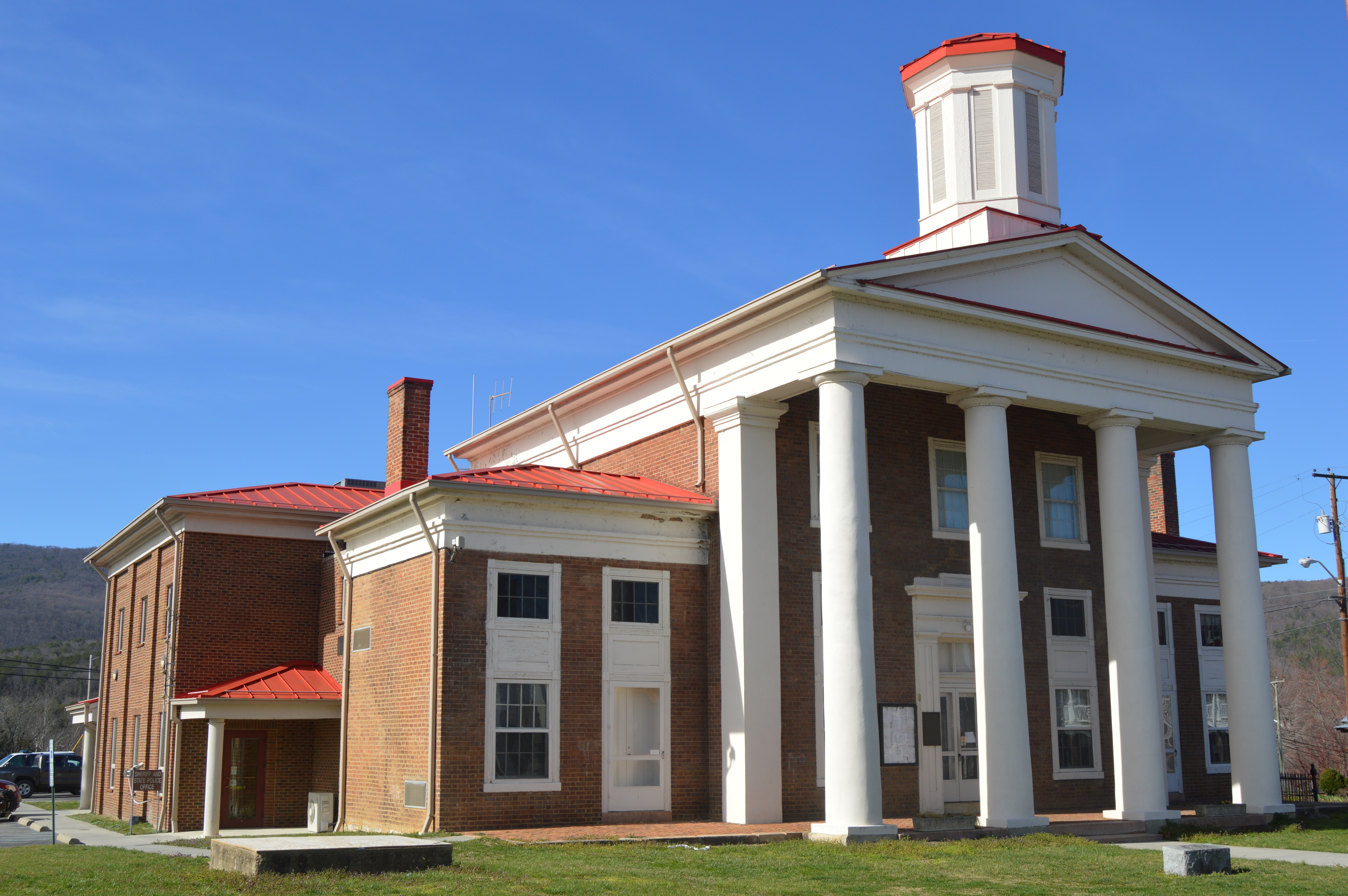
- Craig County Courthouse

- Location within Virginia Location within the United States
- Location: Main and Court Sts.; also Boyd, Broad, Court, Main, Market, Middle, Race, and Walnut Sts., State Routes 42 and 311, Mitchell Dr., and Salem Ave. New Castle, Virginia
- Coordinates: 37°30′14″N 80°6′35″W
- Area: 71.5 acres (28.9 ha)
- Built: 1850; 176 years ago
- Architectural style: Greek Revival
- NRHP reference No.: 73002005, 93000497 (Boundary Increase)
- VLR No.: 268-0013

Significant dates
- Added to NRHP: October 25, 1973, June 10, 1993 (Boundary Increase)
- Designated VLR: September 18, 1973, April 21, 1993

New Castle Historic District is a national historic district located at New Castle in Craig County, Virginia, United States. It encompasses 111 contributing buildings, 2 contributing sites, and 1 contributing object in the central business district and surrounding residential areas of New Castle. The focal point of the district is the Craig County Courthouse. It was built about 1850, and is a temple-form structure with shallow gable roof, a two-story tetrastyle Greek Doric order portico and wooden hexagonal cupola. Associated with the courthouse is the sheriff's house and old jail. Other notable buildings include the Central Hotel, First National Bank Building, Layman Insurance Agency building, Givens-McCartney House (1837), Caldwell-Berger-Lamb House (c. 1852), Bank of New Castle (c. 1900), Farmers and Merchants (F&M) Bank of Craig County (1917–1920), Wagener Brothers Store (c. 1890), Bill Caldwell General Store, George W. Craft (c. 1890), New Castle Methodist Episcopal Church (c. 1893), and Masonic Temple (1940).

It was listed on the National Register of Historic Places in 1973, with a boundary increase in 1993. The original district comprised just five buildings — the courthouse and adjacent sheriff's residence, Layman Insurance, First National Bank, and the Central Hotel — while the expanded district includes 106 additional buildings, as well as two sites and an object.
