= Ceres, Virginia =

Unincorporated community in Virginia, United States

- Unincorporated community
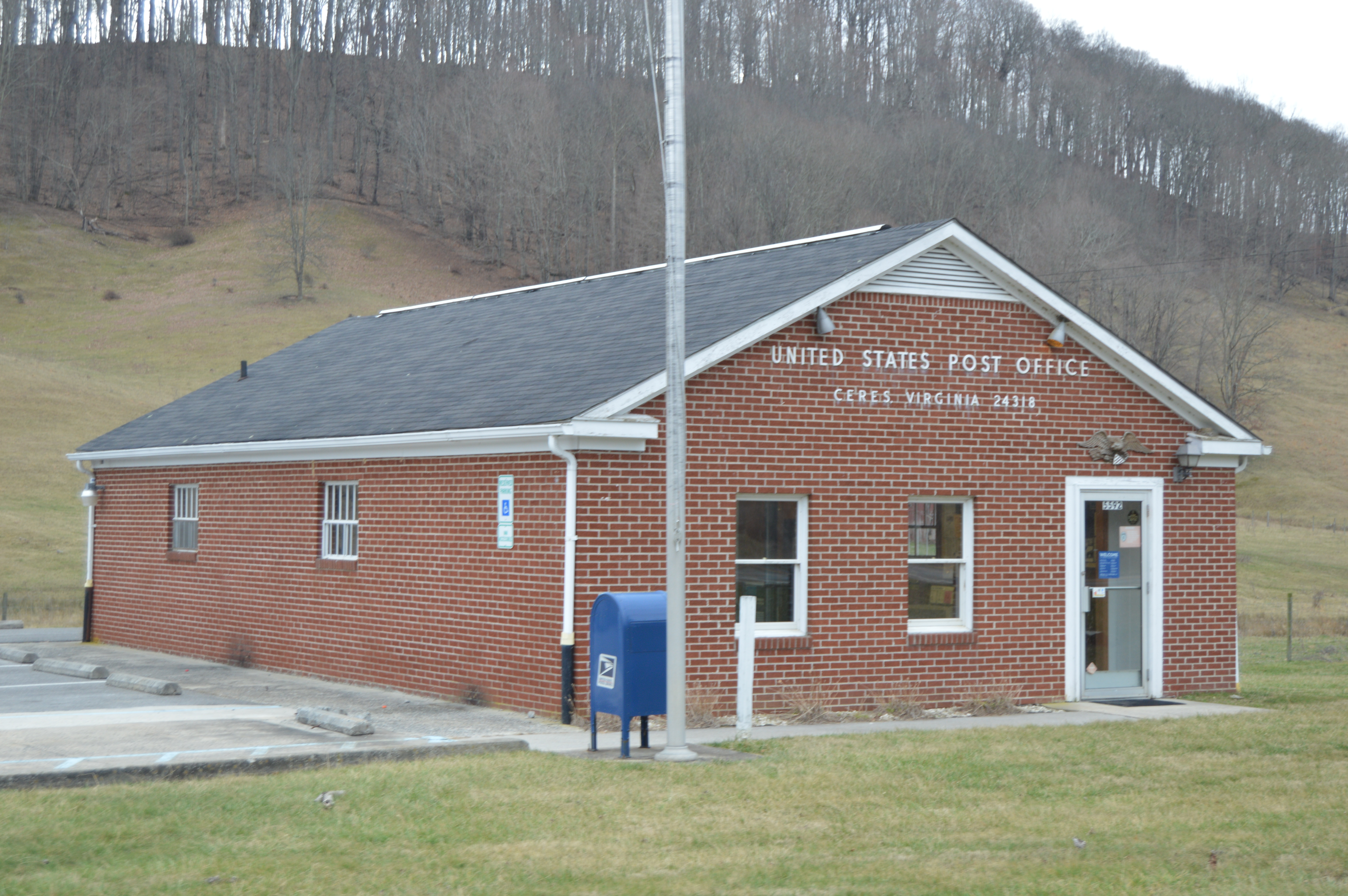
- Post office

- Location within Virginia Location within the United States
- Coordinates: 37°01′04″N 81°20′34″W
- Country: United States
- State: Virginia
- County: Bland
- Elevation: 2,582 ft (787 m)
- Time zone: UTC-5 (Eastern (EST))
  - Summer (DST): UTC-4 (EDT)
- ZIP code: 24318
- Area code: 276
- GNIS feature ID: 1494870

Ceres is an unincorporated community in Bland County, Virginia, United States. Ceres is located on State Route 42, 13.5 miles (21.7 km) west-southwest of Bland. Ceres has a post office with ZIP code 24318.

== Climate ==
The climate in this area features moderate differences between highs and lows, and there is adequate rainfall year-round. According to the Köppen Climate Classification system, Ceres has a marine west coast climate, abbreviated "Cfb" on climate maps.
