= National Register of Historic Places listings in Alleghany County, Virginia =

Location of Alleghany County in Virginia

This is a list of the National Register of Historic Places listings in Alleghany County, Virginia.

This is intended to be a complete list of the properties and districts on the National Register of Historic Places in Alleghany County, Virginia, United States. The locations of National Register properties and districts for which the latitude and longitude coordinates are included below, may be seen in an online map.

There are 14 properties and districts listed on the National Register in the county, including 1 National Historic Landmark.

This National Park Service list is complete through NPS recent listings posted March 6, 2026.

== Current listings ==
	Name on the Register	Image	Date listed	Location	City or town	Description
1	Clifton Forge Commercial Historic District	Clifton Forge Commercial Historic District	January 28, 1992 (#91002015)	Roughly E. Ridgeway St. from Roxbury St. to Main St., and Main from Commercial Ave. to Railroad St.; also 321 Commercial Ave. 37°48′56″N 79°49′34″W	Clifton Forge	321 Commercial represents a boundary increase approved November 24, 2017
2	Clifton Forge Residential Historic District	Clifton Forge Residential Historic District	August 14, 2012 (#12000517)	Roughly bounded by Memorial Park, Crown Hill Cemetery, Dry Creek, Keswick, Lowell, Main, and Pine Sts., and McCormick Boulevard; 37°49′06″N 79°49′32″W	Clifton Forge	
3	Clifton Furnace	Clifton Furnace	August 16, 1977 (#77001485)	Southeast of Clifton Forge off U.S. Route 220; 37°48′35″N 79°47′51″W	Clifton Forge	
4	Douthat State Park Historic District	Douthat State Park Historic District	September 20, 1986 (#86002183)	Douthat State Park Rd. 37°52′02″N 79°48′51″W	Millboro	
5	Humpback Bridge	Humpback Bridge	October 1, 1969 (#69000219)	Over Dunlap Creek, south of the junction of U.S. Route 60 and Rumsey Rd. 37°48′02″N 80°02′49″W	Callaghan	National Historic Landmark designation October 16, 2012
6	Jefferson School	Jefferson School	December 27, 2010 (#10001061)	A St. 37°48′57″N 79°49′08″W	Clifton Forge	
7	Longdale Furnace Historic District	Longdale Furnace Historic District	August 3, 1995 (#95000898)	Roughly along Longdale Furnace Rd., Iron Ore Ln., Church Rd., and Conner Lane; 37°48′34″N 79°41′05″W	Clifton Forge	
8	Luke Mountain Historic District	Luke Mountain Historic District	June 26, 1998 (#98000737)	Luke Mountain Rd. 37°47′36″N 80°00′18″W	Covington	
9	Massie House	Massie House	July 8, 1982 (#82004669)	U.S. Route 220; 37°52′40″N 79°55′14″W	Falling Spring	
10	Oakland Grove Presbyterian Church	Oakland Grove Presbyterian Church	July 8, 1982 (#82004670)	Selma Low Moor Rd. 37°48′07″N 79°51′37″W	Selma	
11	Persinger House	Persinger House	July 8, 1982 (#82004668)	Llama Dr. 37°43′05″N 80°03′33″W	Covington	
12	Rosedale Historic District	Rosedale Historic District	June 26, 1998 (#98000738)	Roughly bounded by U.S. Route 60, the Jackson River, and Luke's Mountain; 37°47′42″N 80°00′00″W	Covington	
13	Sweet Chalybeate Springs	Sweet Chalybeate Springs	January 21, 1974 (#74002103)	South of Earlhurst on State Route 311; 37°38′40″N 80°14′20″W	Sweet Chalybeate	
14	Wood Hall	Wood Hall	July 26, 1982 (#82004667)	Indian Draft Rd. 37°48′59″N 80°04′19″W	Callaghan	

== See also ==
- List of National Historic Landmarks in Virginia
- National Register of Historic Places listings in Virginia
