= Rosedale Historic District =

Rosedale Historic District or Rosedale Park Historic District may refer to:

- Rosedale Historic District (Homewood, Alabama), listed on the NRHP in Alabama
- Rosedale Park Historic District (Homewood, Alabama), listed on the NRHP in Alabama
- Rosedale Park Historic District (Detroit, Michigan), listed on the NRHP in Michigan
- Rosedale Historic District (Rosedale, Mississippi), listed on the NRHP in Mississippi
- Rosedale Historic District (Covington, Virginia), listed on the NRHP in Virginia
