= Humpback bridge =

Type of bridge

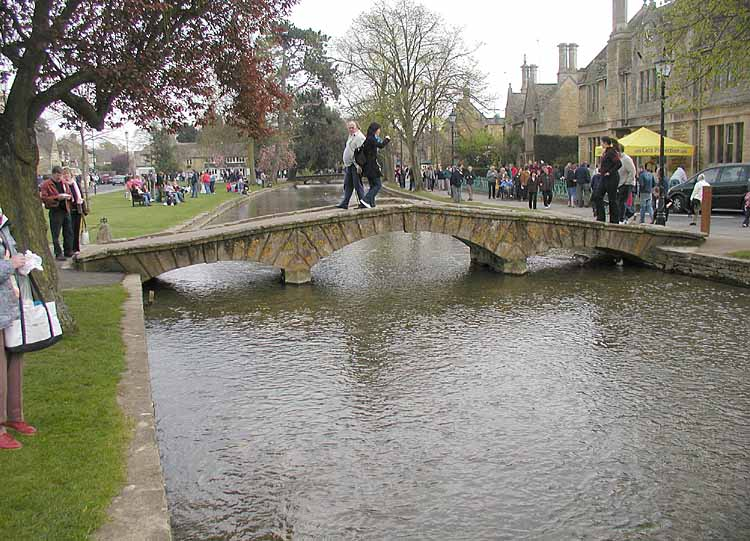
A small humpback bridge in Bourton-on-the-Water, England.

A humpback bridge (or hump bridge) is an arch bridge where the deck follows the curve of the arch, rising from ramps on either side to the crown of the span, forming a hump-like arrangement. Examples include Chinese and Japanese moon bridges and the Humpback Covered Bridge in the United States.

Hump bridges can have restricted visibility of oncoming traffic, and the highway code recommends drivers do not overtake on them.

OpenStreetMap lists over 300 humpback bridges in the UK.
