= Callaghan, Virginia =

Unincorporated community in Virginia, United States

Coordinates: 37°48′43″N 80°04′27″W

- Census-designated place
- Location within Virginia Location within the United States
- Country: United States
- State: Virginia
- Counties: Alleghany
- Elevation: 1,122 ft (342 m)

Population (2010)
  - Total: 348
- Time zone: UTC-5 (Eastern (EST))
  - Summer (DST): UTC-4 (EDT)
- GNIS feature ID: 1492692

Callaghan is an unincorporated community and census-designated place (CDP) in Alleghany County, Virginia, United States. As of the 2020 census, Callaghan had a population of 203.

Humpback Covered Bridge and Wood Hall are listed on the U.S. National Register of Historic Places.

== Demographics ==
Historical population
Census	Pop.	Note	%±
2020	203		—
U.S. Decennial Census; 2010 2020

Callaghan was first listed as a census designated place in the 2010 U.S. census.
