= Clifton Forge Commercial Historic District =

Historic district in Virginia, United States

- U.S. National Register of Historic Places
- U.S. Historic district
- Virginia Landmarks Register
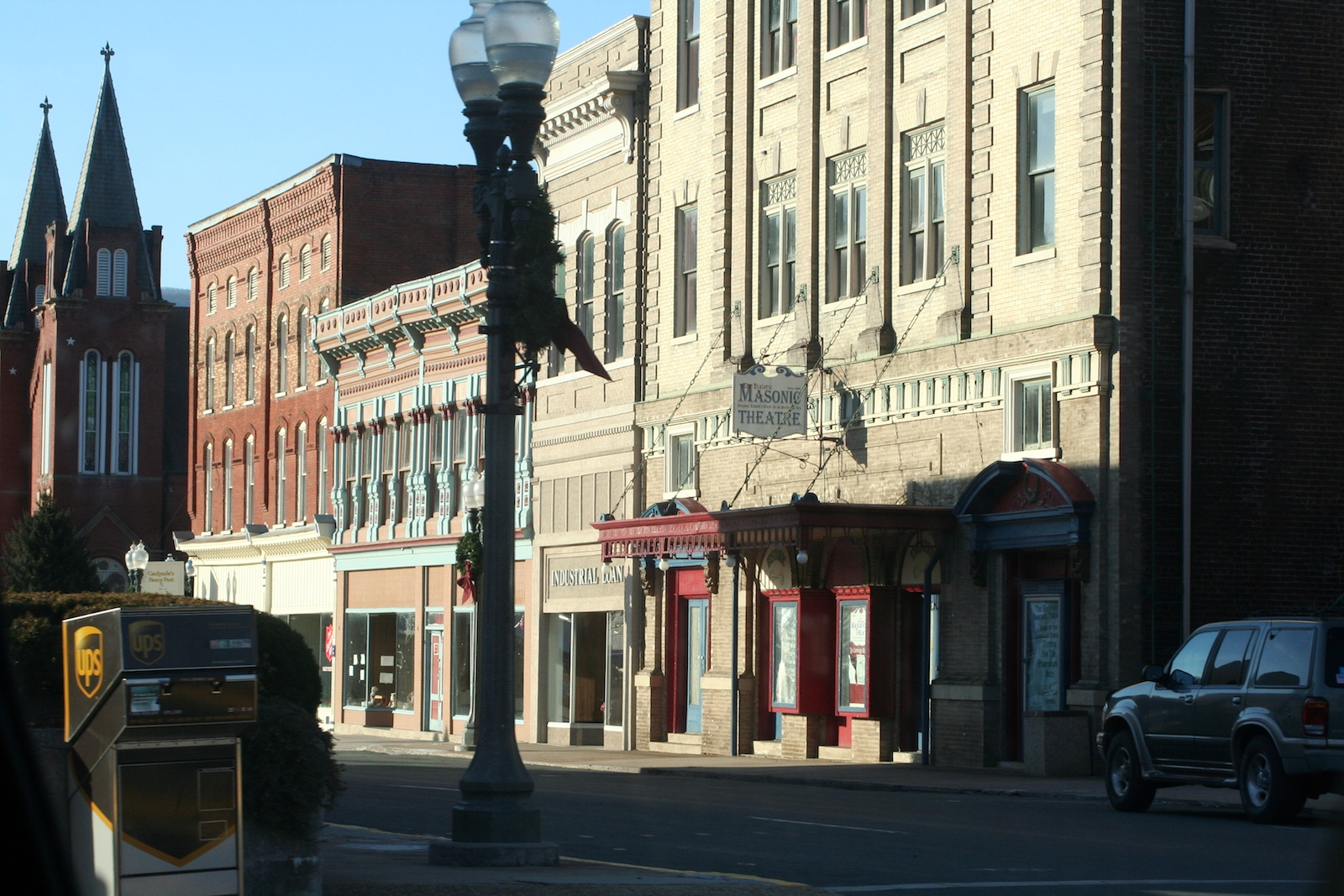
- Downtown Clifton Forge, featuring the Masonic Theatre, in 2008

- Location within Virginia Location within the United States
- Location: Roughly, E. Ridgeway St. from Roxbury St. to Main St. and Main from Commercial Ave. to Railroad St., Clifton Forge, Virginia
- Coordinates: 37°48′58″N 79°49′31″W
- Area: 10 acres (4.0 ha)
- Architect: Frye & Chesterton; Et al.
- Architectural style: Classical Revival, Mission/spanish Revival, Italianate
- NRHP reference No.: 91002015 (original); 100001850 (increase)
- VLR No.: 105-0017

Significant dates
- Added to NRHP: January 28, 1992
- Boundary increase: November 24, 2017
- Designated VLR: August 21, 1991

Clifton Forge Commercial Historic District is a national historic district located at Clifton Forge, Alleghany County, Virginia. The district encompasses 77 contributing buildings in the central business district of Clifton Forge. It primarily includes frame, brick, and concrete block commercial buildings dating to the late-19th and early-20th centuries. The buildings are in a variety of popular architectural styles including Classical Revival, Mission/Spanish Revival, and Italianate. Notable buildings include the Hawkins Brothers Store (c. 1886), Wiley House (1891), Chesapeake and Ohio Office Building (1906), Masonic Theatre (1905), Alleghany Building (1905), Clifton Forge City Hall (1910-1911), U.S. Post Office (1910), Ridge Theatre (1929), the Farrar Building (1930), and the Pure Oil Company Service Station (1932).

It was added to the National Register of Historic Places in 1992, with a slight boundary increase in 2017.

== See also ==
- National Register of Historic Places listings in Alleghany County, Virginia
