= Persinger House =

Historic home in Virginia, US

- U.S. National Register of Historic Places
- Virginia Landmarks Register
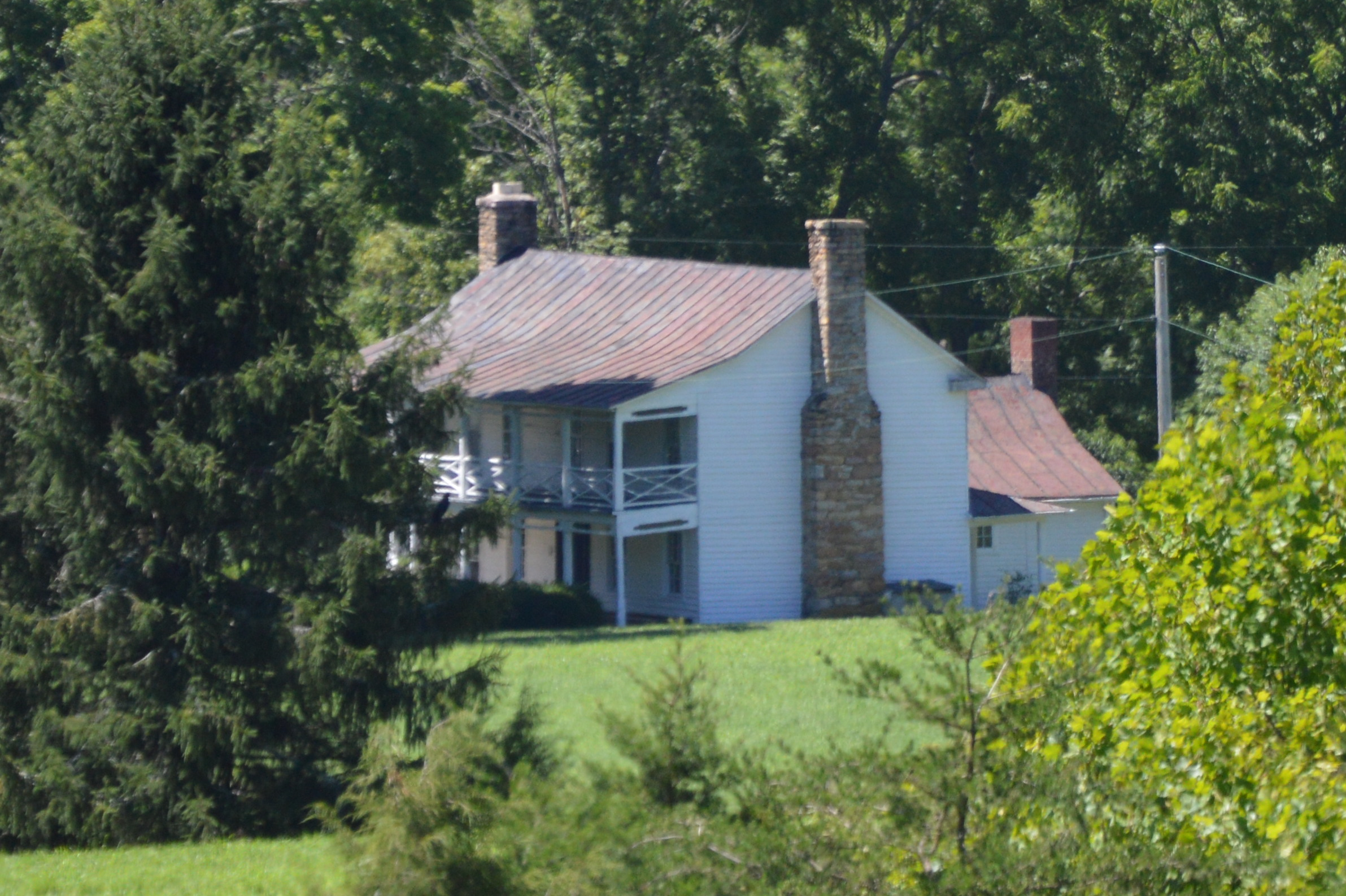
- Distant view from the southeast

- Location within Virginia Location within the United States
- Location: Llama Lane, southwest of Covington, Virginia
- Coordinates: 37°43′4″N 80°3′34″W
- Area: 3 acres (1.2 ha)
- Built: c. 1757, 1888
- NRHP reference No.: 82004668
- VLR No.: 003-0018

Significant dates
- Added to NRHP: July 8, 1982
- Designated VLR: January 20, 1981

Persinger House is a historic home located at Covington, Alleghany County, Virginia. The original section was built about 1757, and enlarged in 1888. It is a two-story, six-bay, single-pile log-and-frame house with weatherboard siding and a gable roof. A 20th-century kitchen is connected to the house by a hyphen. It features a two-story, porch supported by chamfered posts, simple cut-out friezes, and a Chinese lattice railing. Also on the property is a contributing late 19th-century barn.

It was added to the National Register of Historic Places in 1982.
