= Massie House =

Historic house in Virginia, United States

- U.S. National Register of Historic Places
- Virginia Landmarks Register
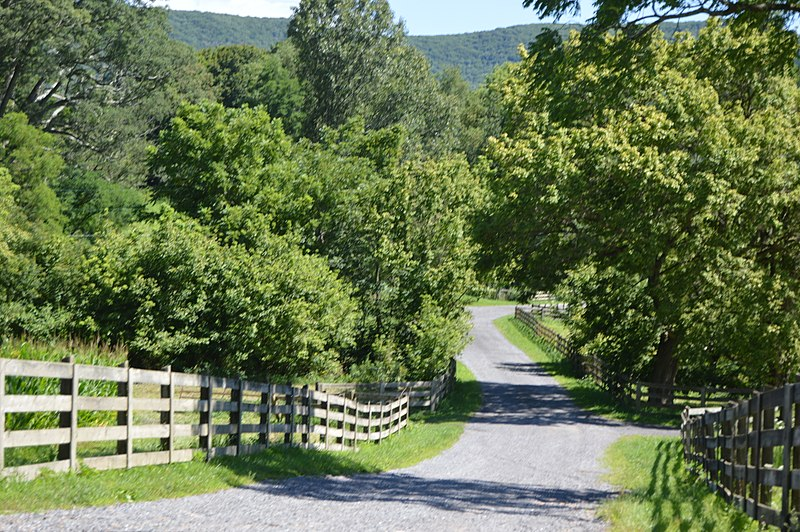
- Driveway to the property

- Location within Virginia Location within the United States
- Location: U.S. Route 220 near Falling Spring, Virginia
- Coordinates: 37°52′41″N 79°55′15″W
- Area: 30 acres (12 ha)
- Built: 1825-1826
- Architectural style: Federal
- Demolished: By 2020
- NRHP reference No.: 82004669
- VLR No.: 003-0011

Significant dates
- Added to NRHP: July 8, 1982
- Designated VLR: December 16, 1980

Massie House, also known as Oak Grove, was a historic home located at Falling Spring, Alleghany County, Virginia. It was built in two phases in 1825–1826, and was a double-pile, two-story, five-bay, wood-frame house on a brick foundation in the Federal style. The main entrance featured the original paneled double-doors ornamented with small Chinese and Gothic motifs, flanked by sidelights and topped by a segmental fanlight.

It was added to the National Register of Historic Places in 1982.

In 2018, the tract of land including Massie House was sold in a court-ordered auction. By 2020, Massie House had been demolished.
