= Falling Spring, Virginia =

Unincorporated community in Virginia, United States

Coordinates: 37°53′11″N 79°58′46″W

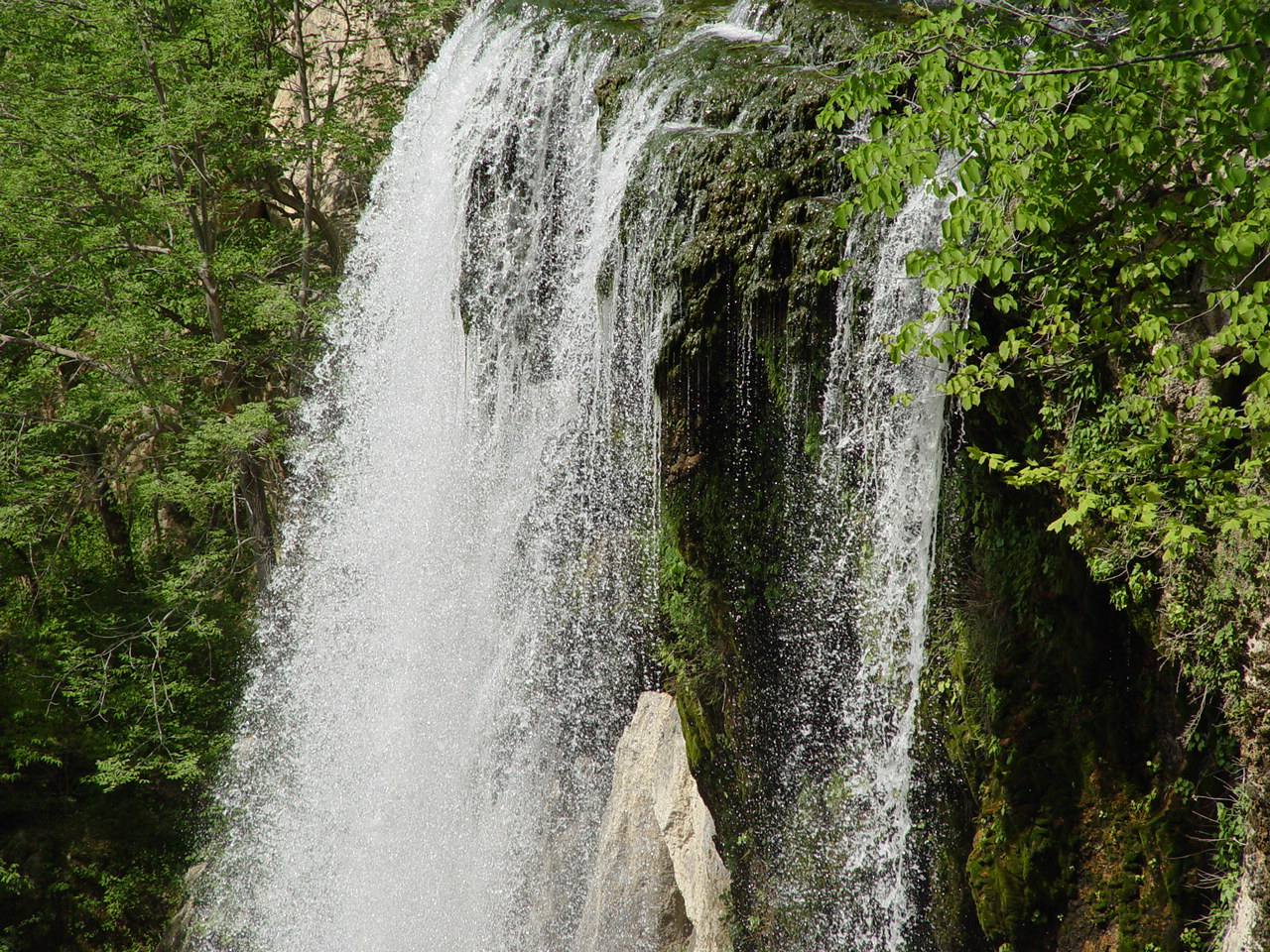
Falling Spring

Falling Spring is an unincorporated community in Alleghany County, Virginia, United States. The name also applies to Falling Spring Falls, a cascade of water nestled in the Alleghany Highlands. The property of the falls and surrounding acreage was granted in 1780 to Thomas Massie by Thomas Jefferson, then governor of Virginia. Jefferson makes explicit reference to the cascade in his Notes on the State of Virginia in the following terms: "The only remarkable cascade in this country is that of the Falling Springs in Augusta (...) it falls over 200 feet into the valley below.

== History ==
Massie House was added to the National Register of Historic Places in 1982.
