= Sweet Chalybeate, Virginia =

Unincorporated community in Virginia, United States

Coordinates: 37°38′41″N 80°14′16″W

Sweet Chalybeate is an unincorporated community in Alleghany County, Virginia, United States. It is located directly across the state-line from Sweet Springs, West Virginia. It is serviced by Virginia State Route 311.

Sweet Chalybeate Springs was added to the National Register of Historic Places in 1974.
