= Oakland Grove Presbyterian Church =

Historic church in Virginia, United States

- U.S. National Register of Historic Places
- Virginia Landmarks Register
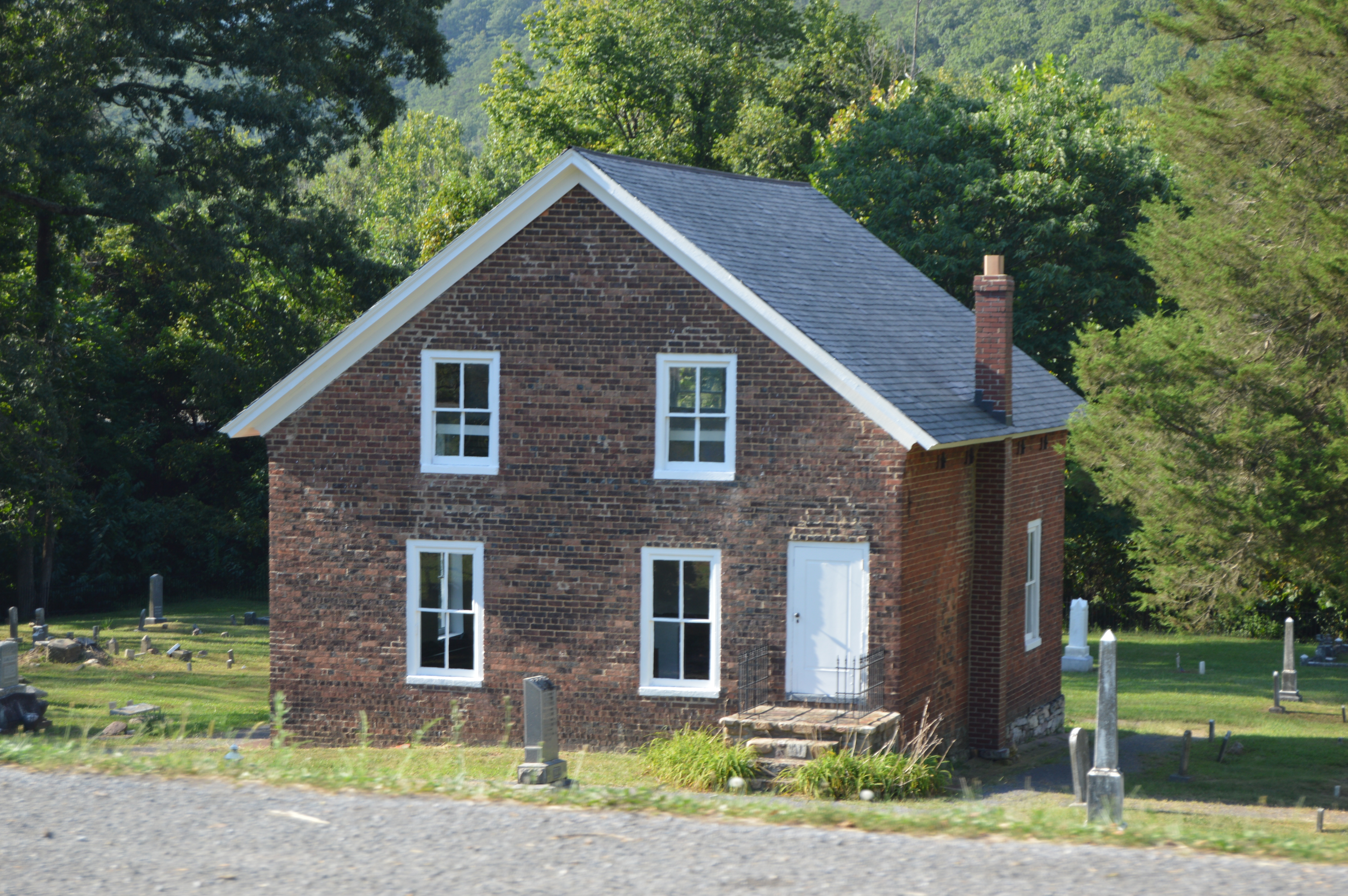
- rear and Eastern side of church

- Location within Virginia Location within the United States
- Location: VA 696, Selma, Virginia
- Coordinates: 37°48′7″N 79°51′37″W
- Area: 1 acre (0.40 ha)
- Built: c. 1847
- NRHP reference No.: 82004670
- VLR No.: 003-0004

Significant dates
- Added to NRHP: July 08, 1982
- Designated VLR: December 16, 1980

Oakland Grove Presbyterian Church is a historic Presbyterian church located at Selma, Alleghany County, Virginia. It was built about 1847, and is a one-story, brick structure measuring 30 feet by 40 feet. It features a molded brick cornice runs beneath the eaves of the slate covered gable roof. It is the oldest known ecclesiastical structure in Alleghany County and is popularly regarded as one of the county's chief historic landmarks.

It was added to the National Register of Historic Places in 1982.
