= Luke Mountain Historic District =

Historic district in Virginia, United States

- U.S. National Register of Historic Places
- U.S. Historic district
- Virginia Landmarks Register
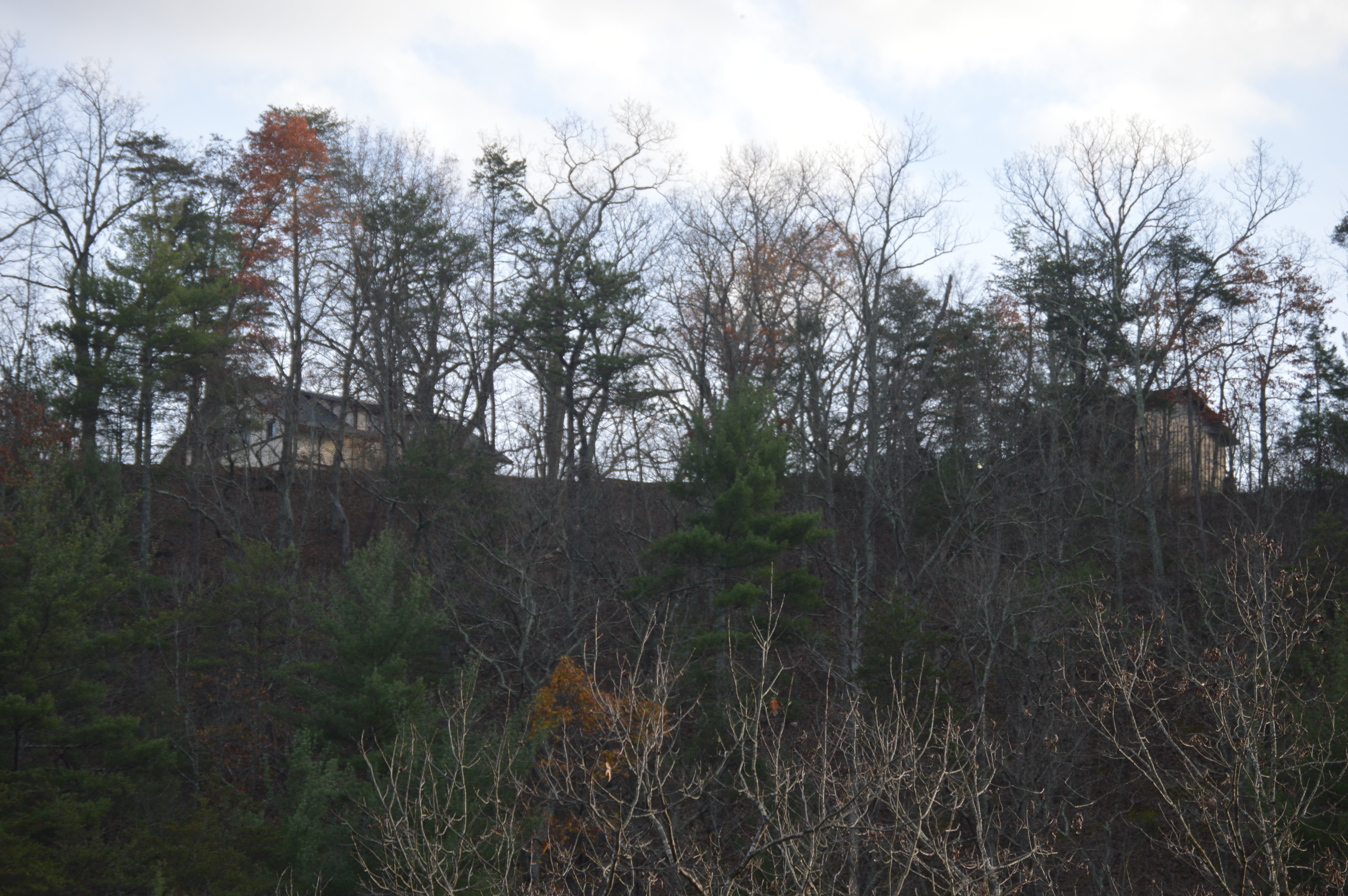
- Distant view from U.S. Route 60 to the north

- Location within Virginia Location within the United States
- Location: Luke Mountain Rd., near Covington, Virginia
- Coordinates: 37°47′36″N 80°00′18″W
- Area: 100 acres (40 ha)
- Built: 1916
- Architect: Multiple
- Architectural style: Bungalow/craftsman, Tudor Revival, Colonial Revival
- NRHP reference No.: 98000737
- VLR No.: 003-5006

Significant dates
- Added to NRHP: June 26, 1998
- Designated VLR: December 3, 1997

Luke Mountain Historic District is a national historic district located near Covington, Alleghany County, Virginia. The district encompasses 12 contributing buildings, 4 contributing sites, 6 contributing structures, and 1 contributing object on Luke Mountain overlooking the city of Covington. It includes three high style dwellings all built for members of the Luke family, the earliest of which was built in 1919. Other contributing resources include the former farm manager's house; agricultural barns, shelters, greenhouses, and storage buildings; and domestic structures such as swimming pools and garages. Other landscape features include a winding entrance drive, a pair of gateposts, stone-lined drainage ditches, a concrete bridge/culvert over Lindsay Glen Run, a reservoir and private water system, terraced fields, pastureland, formal garden spaces, and walking/hiking paths.

It was added to the National Register of Historic Places in 1998.
