= Wood Hall (Callaghan, Virginia) =

Historic house in Virginia, United States

- U.S. National Register of Historic Places
- Virginia Landmarks Register
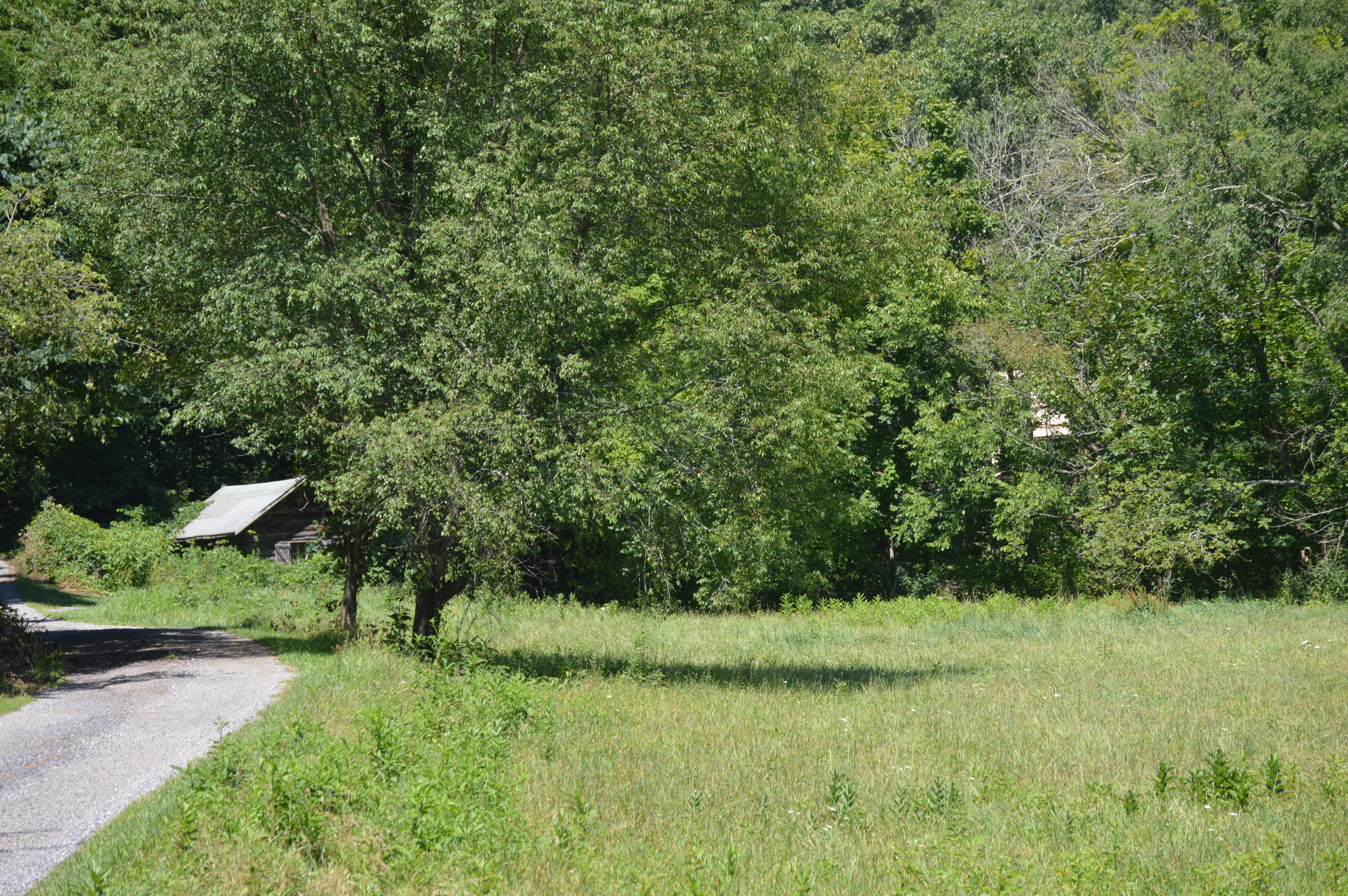
- Driveway and fields with caretaker's cottage at left

- Location within Virginia Location within the United States
- Location: VA 600, Callaghan, Virginia
- Coordinates: 37°48′58″N 80°4′21″W
- Area: 1.5 acres (0.61 ha)
- Built: 1874
- Architectural style: Gothic Revival
- NRHP reference No.: 82004667
- VLR No.: 003-0008

Significant dates
- Added to NRHP: July 26, 1982
- Designated VLR: January 20, 1981

Wood Hall, also known as Milton Hall and Oak Hall, is a historic home located at Callaghan, Alleghany County, Virginia. It was built in 1874, and is a double-pile, two-story, brick house on a stuccoed brick foundation in the Gothic Revival style. It features a two-story, gable roof entrance tower with clasping buttresses and pointed-arch openings. Also on the property is a former caretaker's cottage. It was built for William Wentworth-FitzWilliam, Viscount Milton, whose wife, Lady Laura Milton, brought him from Britain to Alleghany County for his health.

It was added to the National Register of Historic Places in 1982.
