= Sweet Chalybeate Springs =

- U.S. National Register of Historic Places
- Virginia Landmarks Register
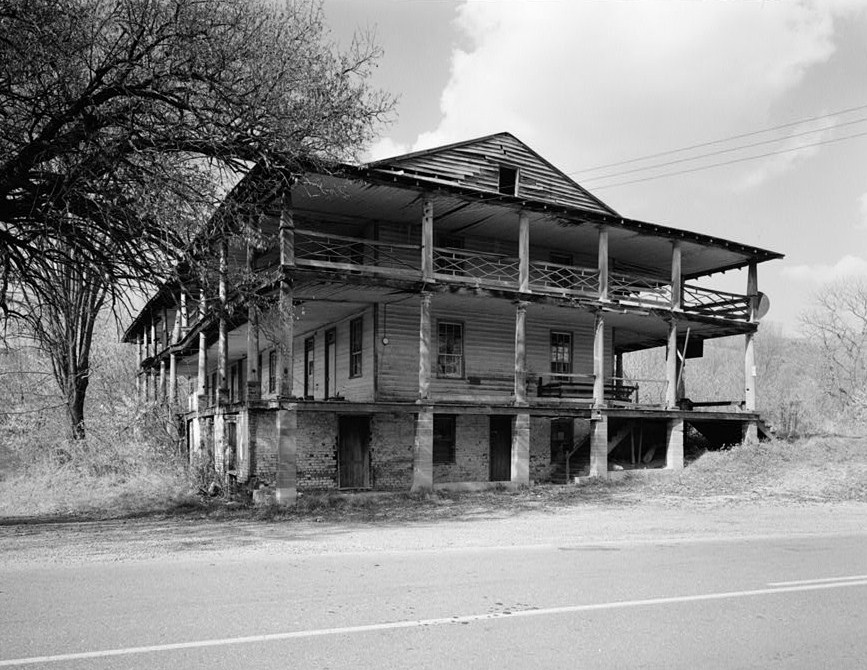
- Sweet Chalybeate Springs, Main Building, HABS Photo, October 1974

- Location within Virginia Location within the United States
- Location: South of Earlhurst on VA 311, Sweet Chalybeate, Virginia
- Coordinates: 37°38′38″N 80°14′32″W
- Area: 18 acres (7.3 ha)
- Built: c. 1850
- NRHP reference No.: 74002103
- VLR No.: 003-0006, 003-0007

Significant dates
- Added to NRHP: January 21, 1974
- Designated VLR: October 16, 1973

Sweet Chalybeate Springs, also known as the Red Sweet Springs, Sweet Chalybeate Hotel and Sweet Chalybeate Springs Lodge, is a historic resort hotel complex located at Sweet Chalybeate, Alleghany County, Virginia. It dates to the 1850s, and consists of a main building, guest ranges, and cottages all fronted with two-level porches. There are a total of eight contributing buildings and one contributing structure. The main building is a gable roof, weatherboarded, frame structure 12 bays long and 2 bays deep. The resort developed around springs flowing undisturbed from the bottom of a small rock bluff. Sweet Chalybeate suffered decline and finally closed its doors in 1918.

It was added to the National Register of Historic Places in 1974.
