= Selma, Virginia =

- CDP
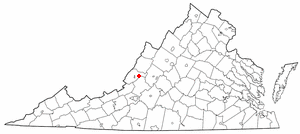
- Location of Selma, Virginia
- Coordinates: 37°48′16″N 79°50′55″W
- Country: United States
- State: Virginia
- County: Alleghany

Area
  - Total: 0.31 sq mi (0.8 km^{2})
  - Land: 0.31 sq mi (0.8 km^{2})
  - Water: 0 sq mi (0.0 km^{2})
- Elevation: 1,148 ft (350 m)

Population (2010)
  - Total: 529
  - Density: 1,700/sq mi (660/km^{2})
- Time zone: UTC−5 (Eastern (EST))
  - Summer (DST): UTC−4 (EDT)
- ZIP code: 24474
- Area code: 540
- FIPS code: 51-71072
- GNIS feature ID: 1493534

Selma is a census-designated place (CDP) in Alleghany County, Virginia, United States. As of the 2020 census, Selma had a population of 357.

== History ==
Oakland Grove Presbyterian Church was added to the National Register of Historic Places in 1982.

== Geography ==
Selma is located at 37°48′16″N 79°50′55″W (37.804444, −79.848716). It is just east of Clifton Forge.

According to the United States Census Bureau, the CDP has a total area of 0.3 square mile (0.8 km^{2}), all land.

== Demographics ==
Historical population
Census	Pop.	Note	%±
2020	357		—
U.S. Decennial Census; 2000 2010 2020

Selma was first listed as a census designated place in the 2000 U.S. census.

As of the census of 2000, there were 485 people, 196 households, and 135 families residing in the CDP. The population density was 1,542.8 people per square mile (604.1/km^{2}). There were 217 housing units at an average density of 690.3/sq mi (270.3/km^{2}). The racial makeup of the CDP was 99.59% White, and 0.41% African American.

There were 196 households, out of which 27.6% had children under the age of 18 living with them, 58.7% were married couples living together, 5.6% had a female householder with no husband present, and 31.1% were non-families. 26.5% of all households were made up of individuals, and 15.8% had someone living alone who was 65 years of age or older. The average household size was 2.47 and the average family size was 3.01.

In the CDP, the population was spread out, with 24.3% under the age of 18, 5.6% from 18 to 24, 24.9% from 25 to 44, 25.4% from 45 to 64, and 19.8% who were 65 years of age or older. The median age was 41 years. For every 100 females, there were 103.8 males. For every 100 females age 18 and over, there were 96.3 males.

The median income for a household in the CDP was $31,250, and the median income for a family was $34,286. Males had a median income of $31,250 versus $16,429 for females. The per capita income for the CDP was $14,045. None of the population or families were below the poverty line.
