= Humpback Covered Bridge =

Bridge in Alleghany County, Virginia

- U.S. National Register of Historic Places
- U.S. National Historic Landmark
- Virginia Landmarks Register
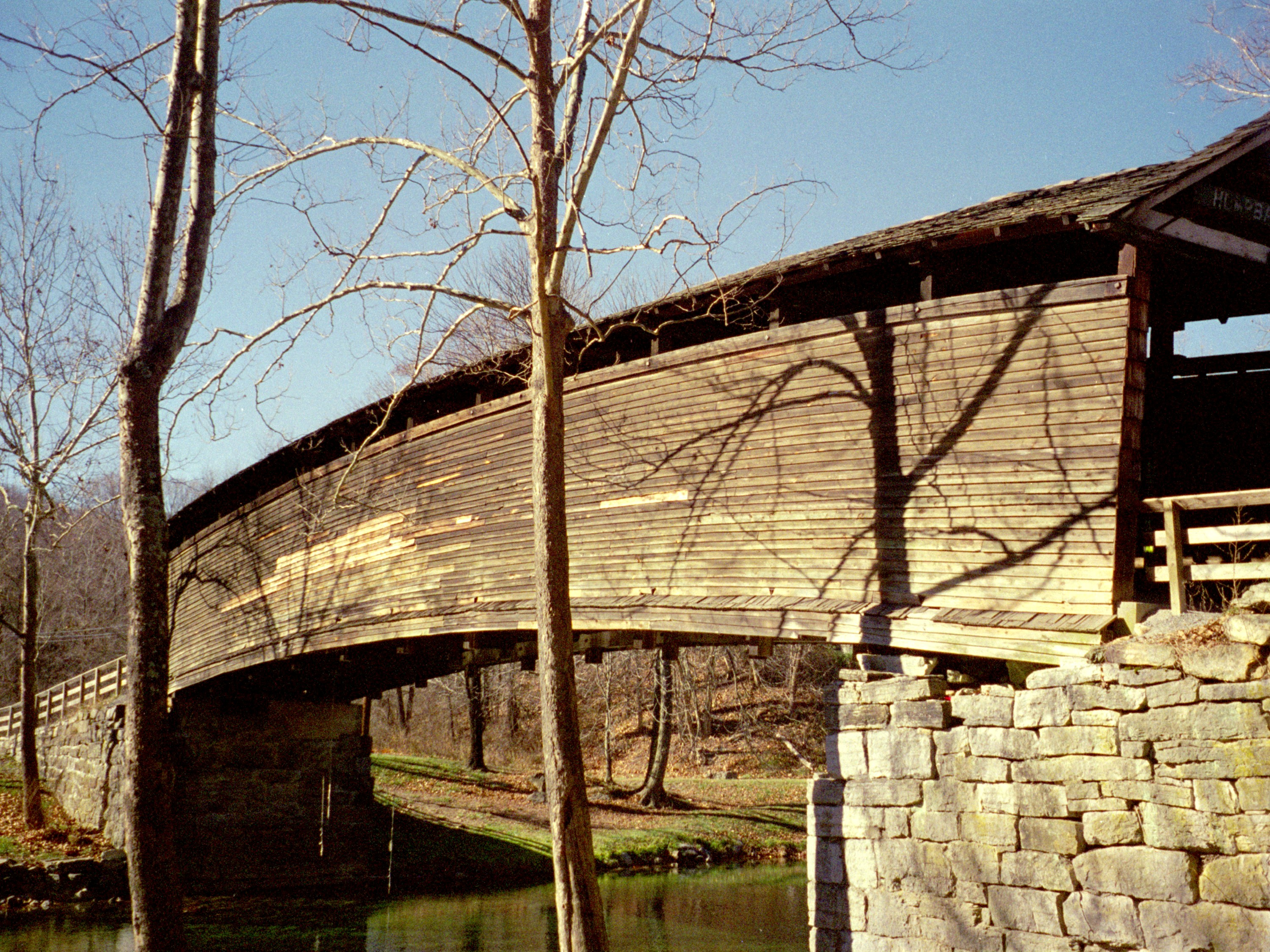
- The Humpback Covered Bridge is one of the last remaining bridges of its type in the U.S.
- Location: Alleghany County, Virginia
- Nearest city: Covington, Virginia
- Coordinates: 37°48′2.15″N 80°2′49.24″W
- Built: 1857
- NRHP reference No.: 69000219
- VLR No.: 003-0002

Significant dates
- Added to NRHP: October 1, 1969
- Designated NHL: October 16, 2012
- Designated VLR: November 5, 1968

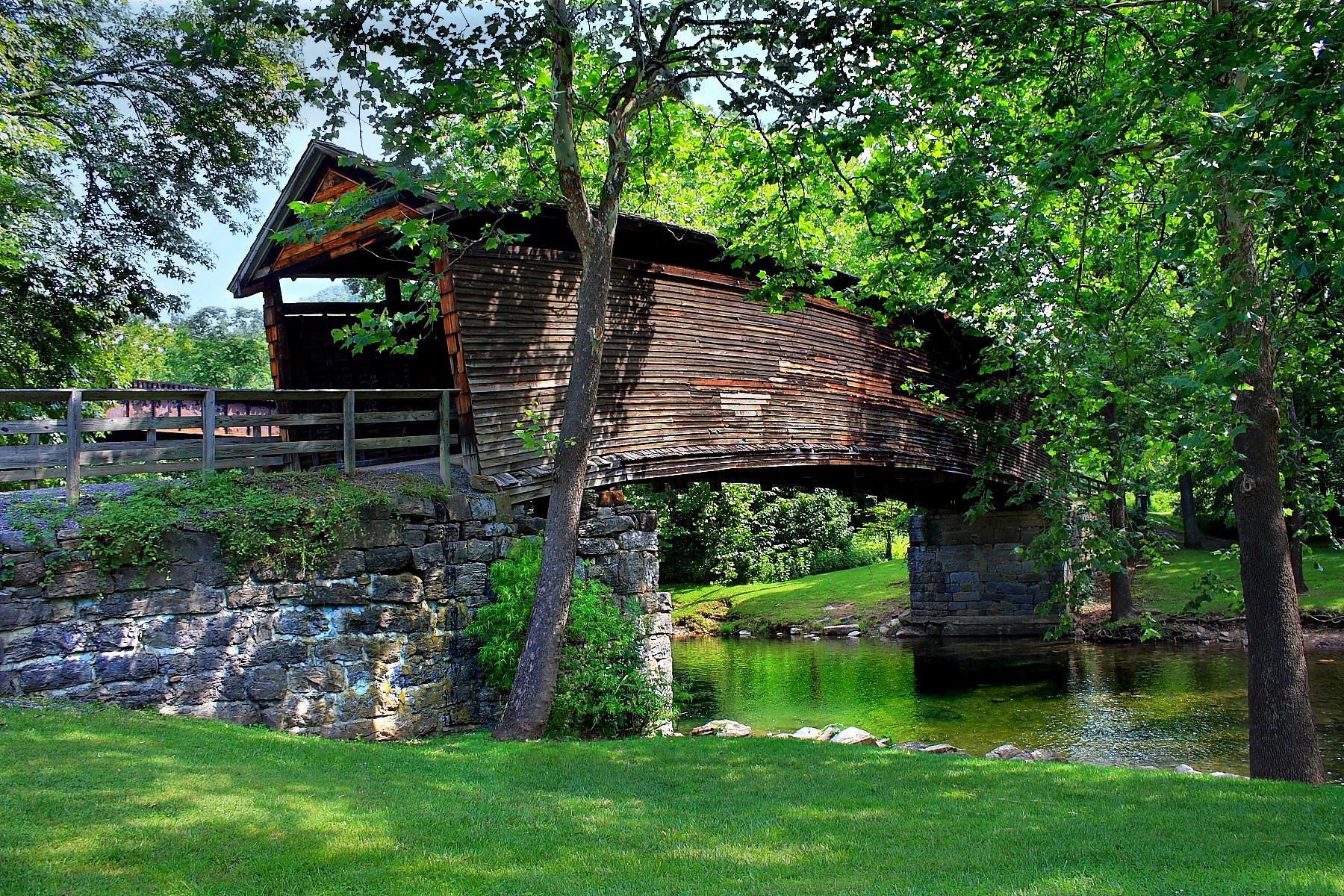

The Humpback Covered Bridge located in the U.S. state of Virginia, is one of the few remaining covered bridges in the United States that was built higher in the middle than on either end; hence the name of "humpback". The bridge was built in 1857 and is also the oldest remaining covered bridge in the state of Virginia. Its WGCB number is 46-03-01. The bridge spans a tributary of the Jackson River known as Dunlap Creek, for a distance of 109 feet (33 m). The humpback feature is 4 feet (1.2 m) higher in the center than at either end. The bridge is located near the city of Covington, Virginia.

== History ==
Covered bridges were first built in the 1810s when it was determined that adding a roof over wooden bridges would better protect the decking and support trusses and increase the lifespan of the bridge. The decking and support systems of the era would last an average of ten years on uncovered wooden bridges. As was later discovered, covered wooden bridges ultimately averaged ten times the lifespan of uncovered ones. Covered bridges were sometimes referred to as "kissing bridges" during the more modest era of the late 19th Century, as the privacy from passing through a covered bridge would allow passengers in horse and buggy an opportunity to kiss each other unobserved.

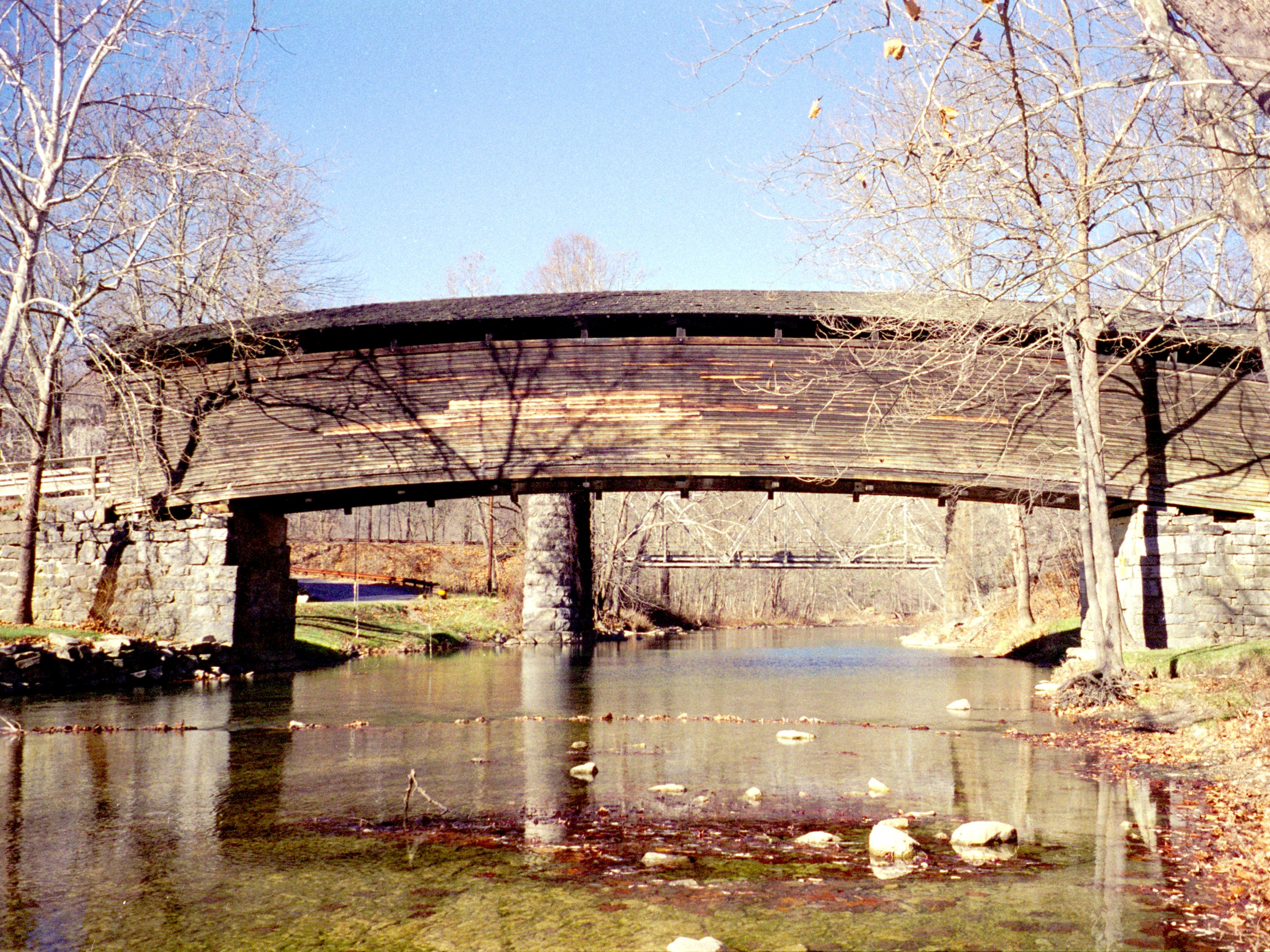
Side view of Humpback Bridge from the south

Three bridges stood at approximately the same location as Humpback Covered Bridge does today. The first bridge was built in the 1820s and was destroyed by a flood in 1837. A second bridge built the next year was also damaged beyond repair by a flood on July 13, 1842. The third bridge collapsed in 1856 due to heavy use and fatigue from weathering. None of these earlier bridges were either arched or covered. All three bridges were a part of the James River and Kanawha Turnpike, a heavily used mountain road that connected the Shenandoah Valley with the Alleghany Mountains and areas further west. The current bridge was built in 1857 and the design of both covering and also arching the bridge was hoped to increase the longevity of the bridge by protecting the midsection from future floods and the decking from the ravaging effects of moisture and sunlight. The decking, unlike houses and other structures, could not be painted to prevent deterioration, as the traffic from horses and wagons would quickly remove any available paints of the era.

The Humpback Covered Bridge was used from 1857 to 1929, when a steel truss bridge was built for U.S. Route 60 immediately to the north. The bridge was abandoned but was sometimes used by a local farmer into the early 1950s to store hay bales. In 1953, the Virginia Highway Department matched a $5,000 fund that had been raised by the Covington Business and Professional Women's Club and the Covington Chamber of Commerce. Five acres surrounding the bridge were purchased and a small wayside park which opened in 1954 was built, allowing easier access. On October 1, 1969, the bridge was listed in the National Register of Historic Places, and in 2012 it was designated a National Historic Landmark.

== Construction ==
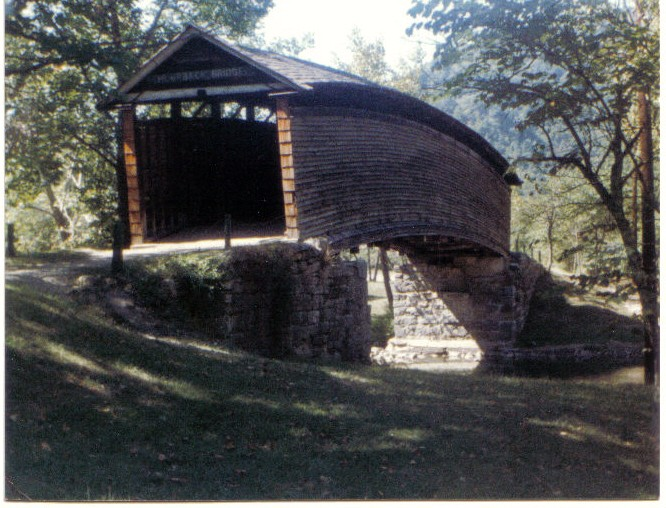
West entrance of bridge

Most covered bridges were made of the strongest readily available wood. In the case of the Humpback Covered Bridge, this meant white oak and hickory. The bridge, as it stands today, has most of the original hand-hewn support timbers and decking that was laid down in 1857, however, most of the walls and roofing have been replaced several times since. Bridge decking was traditionally constructed of wide planks a foot (30.5 cm) or more in width and 4 to 6 inches (10 to 15 cm) in thickness. Most of the support beams are at least a foot thick. The supports in the bridge utilized hand-made honey locust wood pins to fasten sections of the supports together. The supports incorporate a unique curved multiple kingpost-truss system that is not found in any other surviving wooden bridge in the U.S. The bridge is an original and unique design not duplicated anywhere else.

== Location ==
Humpback covered bridge is located 3 miles (4.3 km) west of Covington, Virginia adjacent to U.S. Highway 60 off Rumsey Road (SR 600). Exit number 10 in Virginia off of Interstate 64 is less than 1 mile (1.6 km) from the bridge site. The 5-acre (2.0 ha) wayside park includes a parking area, restrooms, a picnic area and access to Dunlap Creek.

== See also ==
- List of covered bridges in Virginia
- List of National Historic Landmarks in Virginia
- National Register of Historic Places listings in Alleghany County, Virginia
- List of bridges documented by the Historic American Engineering Record in Virginia
- List of bridges on the National Register of Historic Places in Virginia

== Bibliography ==
- Virginia Department of Transportation. "Humpback Bridge". Virginia's Covered Bridges. Archived from the original on June 15, 2006.
- National Park Service, Historic American Engineering Record (HAER). "Covered Bridges, Spanning the American Landscape" (PDF).
- Johnson, Phyllis. "Book documenting covered bridges spurs preservation".
- "Virginia - Alleghany County". National Register of Historic Places.
