= Rosedale Historic District (Covington, Virginia) =

Historic district in Virginia, United States

- U.S. National Register of Historic Places
- U.S. Historic district
- Virginia Landmarks Register
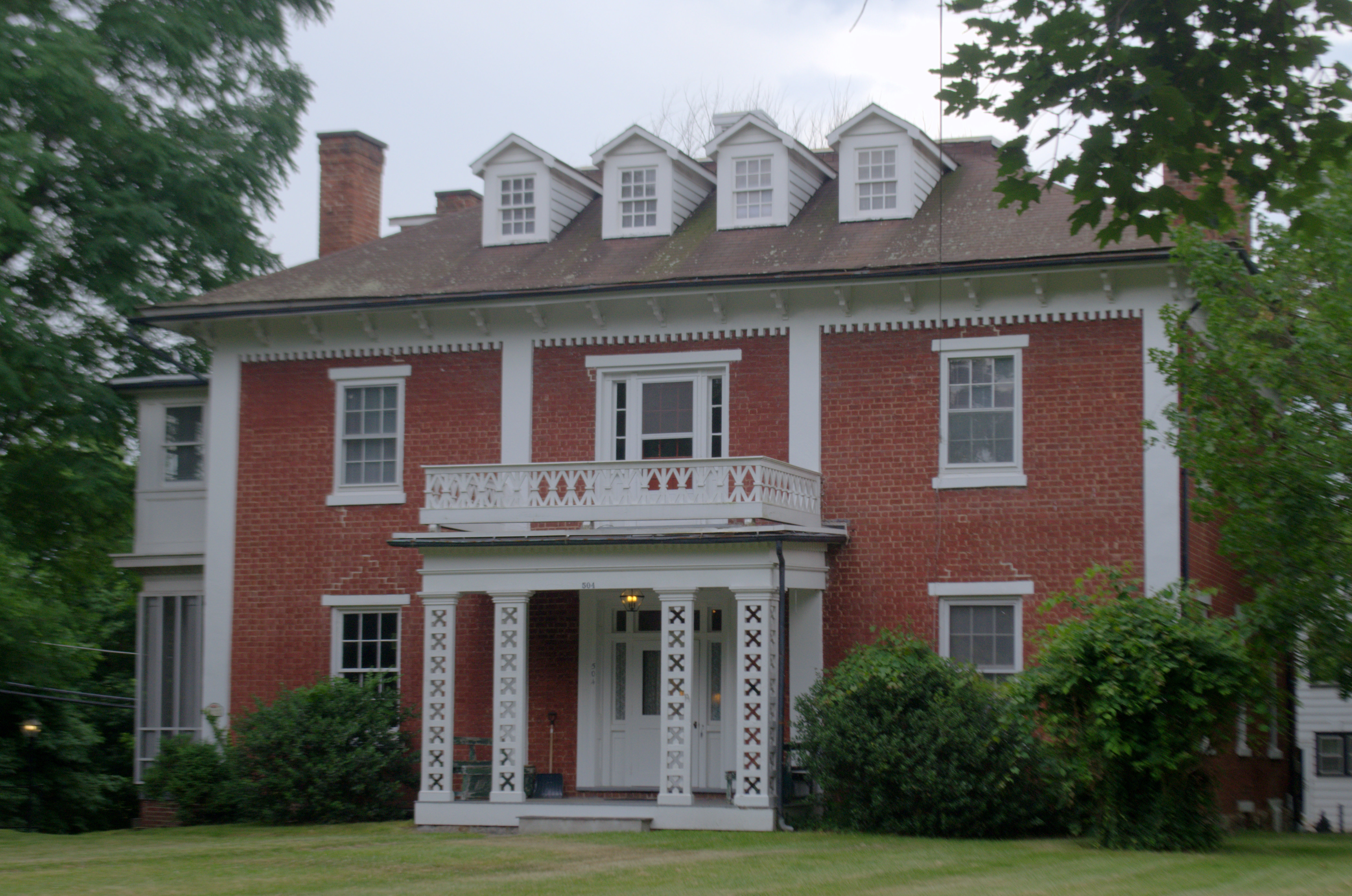
- Rosedale Plantation House (Covington, Virginia)

- Location within Virginia Location within the United States
- Location: Roughly bounded by US 60, Jackson River. and Luke's Mountain, Covington, Virginia
- Coordinates: 37°42′42″N 79°59′59″W
- Area: 43 acres (17 ha)
- Built: 1856
- Architect: Multiple
- Architectural style: Greek Revival, Queen Anne, Classical Revival
- NRHP reference No.: 98000738
- VLR No.: 003-0348

Significant dates
- Added to NRHP: June 26, 1998
- Designated VLR: April 28, 1995

Rosedale Historic District is a national historic district located at Covington, Alleghany County, Virginia. The district encompasses 76 contributing buildings, 1 contributing site, and 2 contributing structures in a predominantly residential section of Alleghany County. The buildings represent a variety of popular architectural styles including the Queen Anne, Greek Revival, and Classical Revival styles. The most notable residence is Rose Dale, constructed in the late-1850s as a plantation house. The Rosedale neighborhood was in established in 1899–1900. In addition to the dwellings a former hospital is situated in the district.

It was added to the National Register of Historic Places in 1998.

== Gallery ==
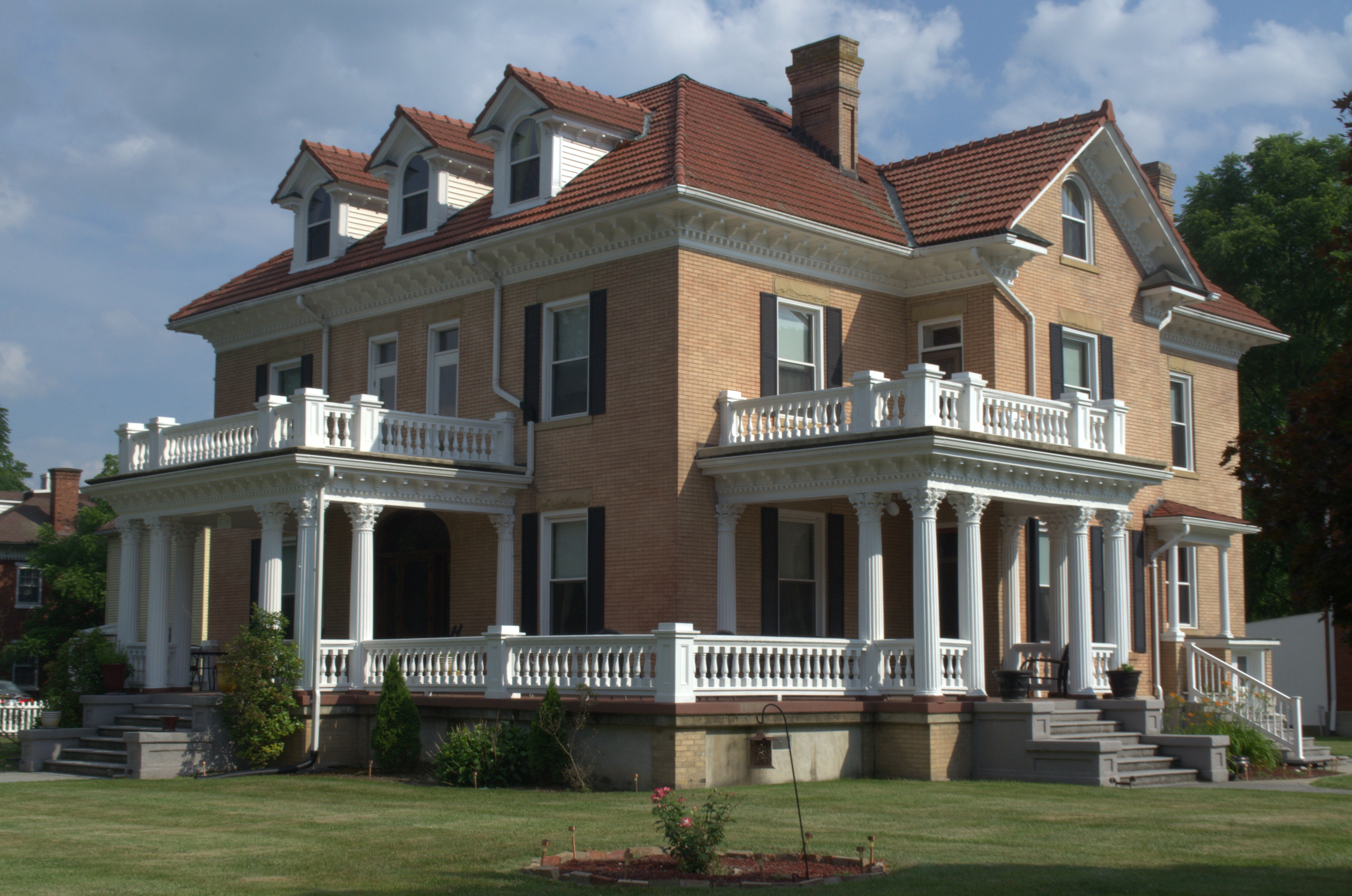
Frank and Mattie Hammond House

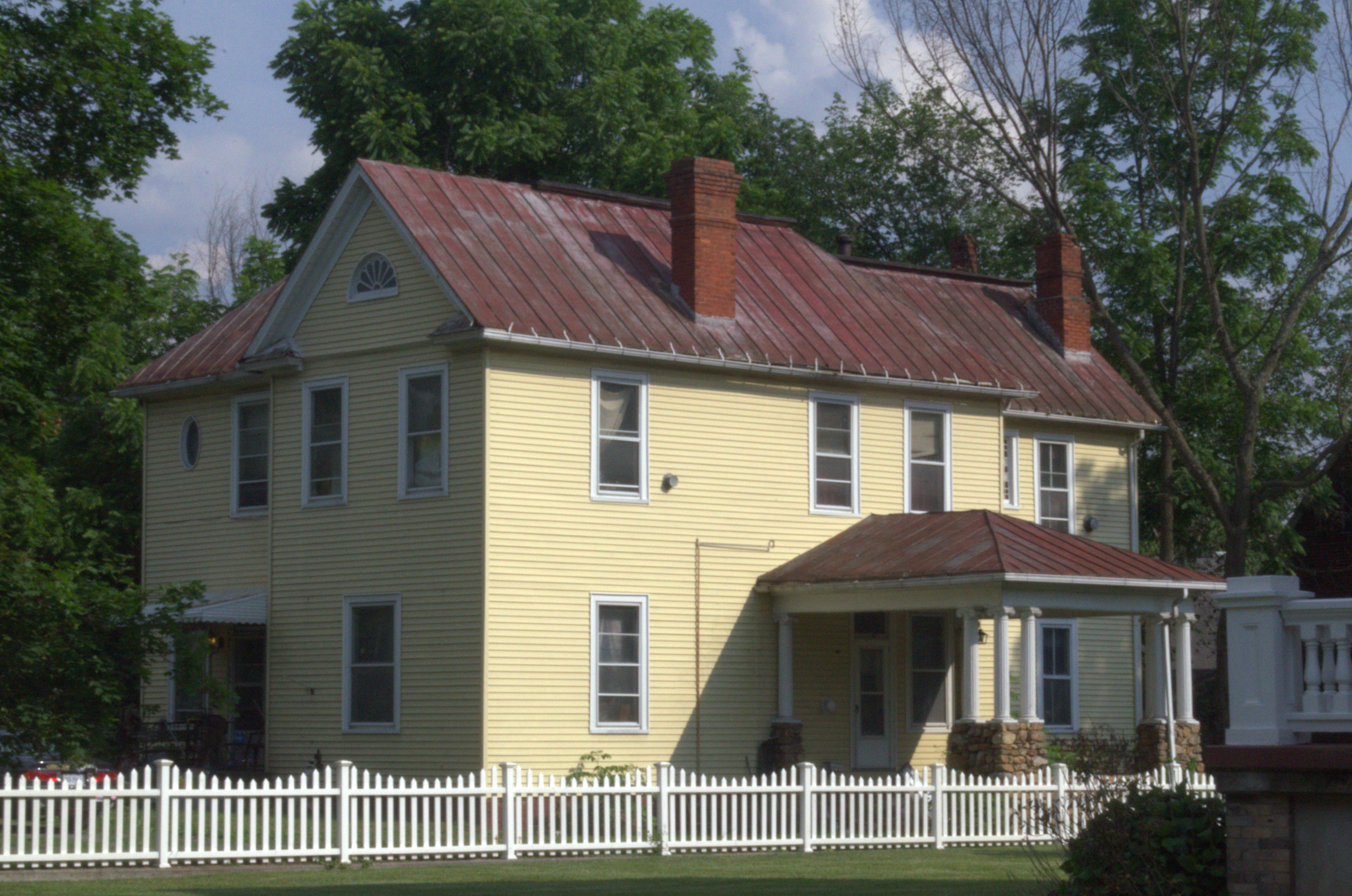
William and Annie McAllister House
