= Harrisonburg metropolitan area =

Harrisonburg Metropolitan Area
- Metropolitan Statistical Area
- Harrisonburg, Va. Metropolitan Statistical Area
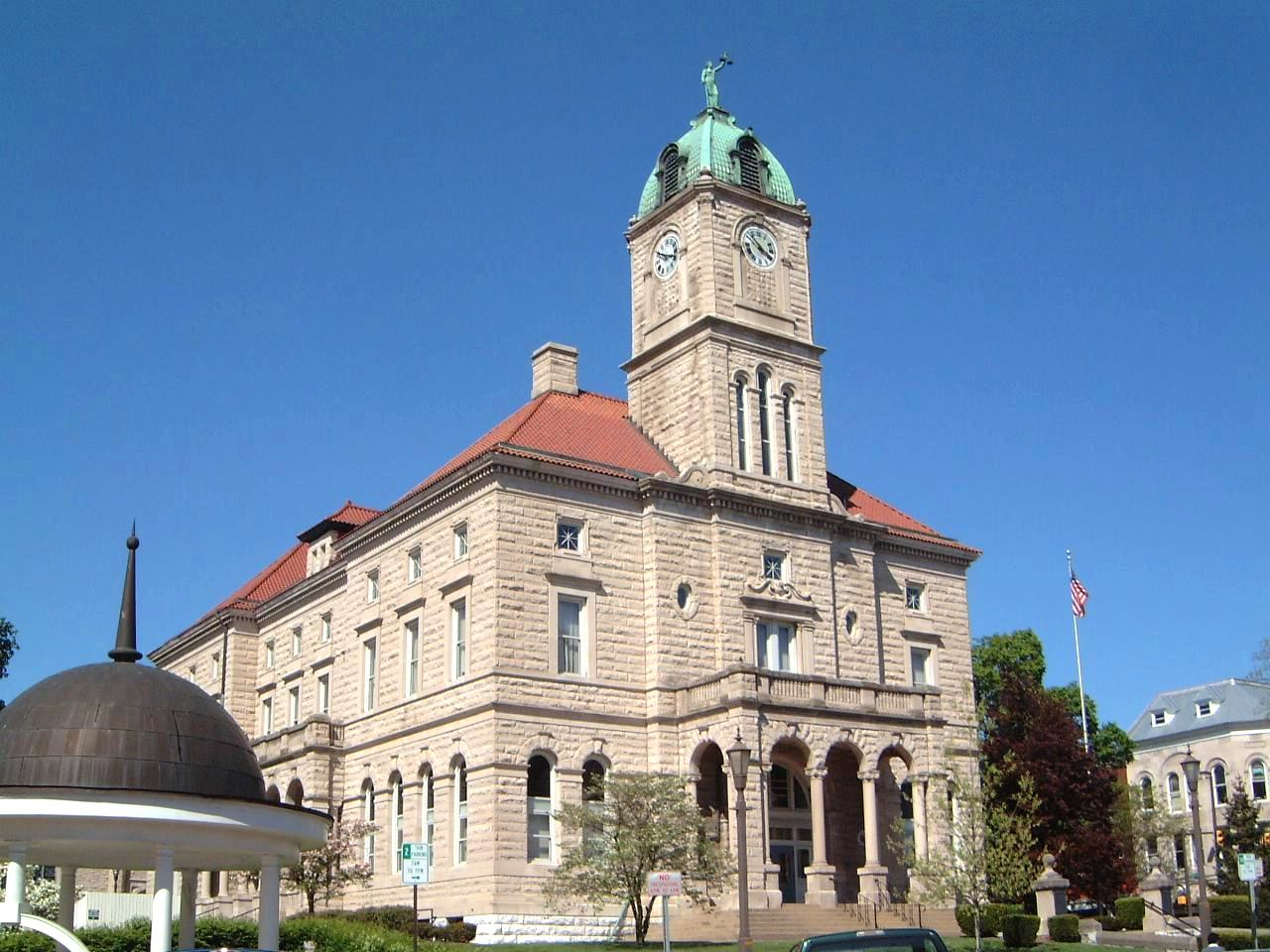
- Rockingham County Courthouse in Court Square
Map of Harrisonburg–Staunton–Stuarts Draft CSA
Harrisonburg, VA MSA
City of Harrisonburg
Staunton–Stuarts Draft, VA MSA
City of Staunton
City of Waynesboro
- Country: United States
- State: Virginia
- Largest city: Harrisonburg

Area
  - Total: 870.69 sq mi (2,255.1 km^{2})
  - Land: 866.34 sq mi (2,243.8 km^{2})
  - Water: 4.35 sq mi (11.3 km^{2}) 0.5%

Population (2020)
  - Total: 135,571 (US: 302nd)
- Time zone: UTC−5 (EST)
  - Summer (DST): UTC−4 (EDT)
- ZIP codes: 22801–22803, 22807, 22811, 22812, 22815, 22820, 22821, 22827, 22830–22834, 22840, 22841, 22844, 22846, 22848–22850, 22853, 24441, 24471
- Area code: 540
- FIPS code 6-4: 25500

The Harrisonburg Metropolitan Statistical Area is a Metropolitan Statistical Area (MSA) in Virginia as defined by the United States Office of Management and Budget (OMB). As of the 2020 census, the MSA had a population of 135,571 (though a July 1, 2021 estimate placed the population at 135,824).

== Components ==
Note: Since a state constitutional change in 1871, all cities in Virginia are independent cities that are not located in any county. The OMB considers these independent cities to be county-equivalents for the purpose of defining MSAs in Virginia.

One county and one independent city are included in the Harrisonburg Metropolitan Statistical Area.

- Counties
  - Rockingham
- Independent Cities
  - Harrisonburg

== Communities ==
=== Incorporated places ===
- Bridgewater
- Broadway
- Dayton
- Elkton
- Grottoes (partial)
- Harrisonburg (Principal city)
- Mount Crawford
- Timberville

=== Census-designated places ===
Note: All census-designated places are unincorporated.

- Massanutten

=== Other unincorporated places ===
- Bergton
- Briery Branch
- Clover Hill
- Cootes Store
- Criders
- Cross Keys
- Dale Enterprise
- Edom
- Fulks Run
- Hinton
- Inglewood
- Keezletown
- Lacey Spring
- Linville
- Lilly
- Mauzy
- Mayland
- McGaheysville
- Montezuma
- Mount Clinton
- Penn Laird
- Pleasant Valley
- Port Republic
- Rawley Springs
- Singers Glen
- Stemphleytown
- Tenth Legion
- Turleytown
- Yankeetown

=== Independent city ===
As an independent city, Harrisonburg is not a part of Rockingham County, despite its status as the county seat.

== Demographics ==
As of the census of 2000, there were 108,193 people, 38,488 households, and 25,337 families residing within the MSA. The racial makeup of the MSA was 92.19% White, 3.07% African American, 0.15% Native American, 1.35% Asian, 0.02% Pacific Islander, 1.82% from other races, and 1.42% from two or more races. Hispanic or Latino of any race were 5.36% of the population.

The median income for a household in the MSA was $35,349, and the median income for a family was $45,711. Males had a median income of $30,285 versus $22,403 for females. The per capita income for the MSA was $16,847.

== See also ==
- List of U.S. Metropolitan Statistical Areas in Virginia
- Virginia census statistical areas
