= Virginia State Route 257 =

State highway in Rockingham County, Virginia, US

State Route 257

Route information
- Maintained by VDOT
- Length: 18.04 mi (29.03 km)
- Existed: July 1, 1933–present

Major junctions
- West end: SR 902 / SR 924 near Briery Branch
- SR 42 in Dayton; US 11 in Mount Crawford
- East end: I-81 / SR 682 near Mount Crawford

Location
- Country: United States
- State: Virginia
- Counties: Rockingham

Highway system
- Virginia Routes; Interstate; US; Primary; Secondary; Byways; History; HOT lanes
| ← SR 256 | → US 258 |

State Route 257 (SR 257) is a primary state highway in the U.S. state of Virginia. The state highway runs 18.04 miles (29.03 km) from SR 902 and SR 924 near Briery Branch east to Interstate 81 (I-81) near Mount Crawford. SR 257 connects I-81 and U.S. Route 11 (US 11) with Bridgewater and Dayton, between which the highway runs concurrently with SR 42. The state highway also provides access to Bridgewater College and connects Dayton with the western Rockingham County communities of Briery Branch, Ottobine and Montezuma.

== Route description ==
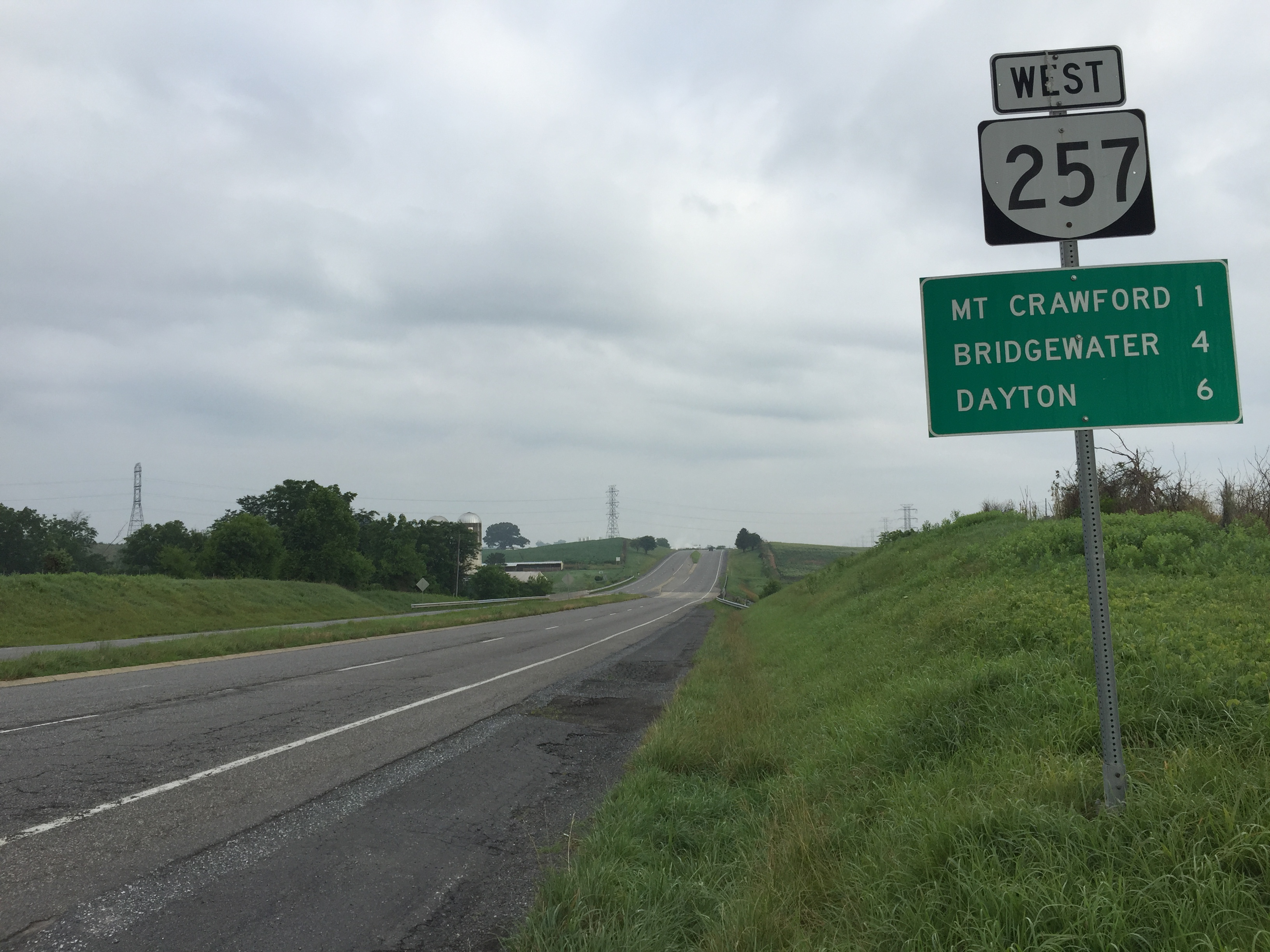
View west along SR 257 near I-81 near Mount Crawford

SR 257 begins at the intersection of SR 902 and SR 924 (Briery Branch Road) within George Washington National Forest west of Briery Branch. The state highway heads northeast as two-lane undivided Briery Branch Road, which crosses Hone Quarry Run and follows Briery Branch east through its gap in Narrow Back Mountain. SR 257 veers away from the creek, exits the national forest, and enters the Shenandoah Valley. The state highway heads southeast to the community of Briery Branch, where the highway has a pair of right-angle turns at disjoint sections of SR 731, which heads south as Community Center Road and north as Daniel Cupp Road. SR 257 continues east to Ottobine, where the highway turns southeast at its four-way intersection with SR 613 (Clover Hill Road) and SR 742 (Waggys Creek Road). The state highway continues as Ottobine Road, which passes to the south of Paul State Forest. SR 257 passes through the village of Montezuma and crosses the Dry River.

SR 257 passes through Stemphleytown before entering the town of Dayton, where the highway becomes Mason Street. The state highway intersects Main Street, which heads north as SR 42 Business, and has a very short concurrency with the business route east to SR 42 (John Wayland Highway). SR 257 runs concurrently with SR 42 along the four-lane divided highway south out of Dayton. At the northern town limit of Bridgewater, the road becomes a three-lane road with a center left-turn lane and its name changes to Main Street. In downtown Bridgewater, SR 257 turns east onto two-lane Dinkel Avenue, which passes through the campus of Bridgewater College. SR 257 leaves the town and intersects US 11 (Lee Highway) just north of the town of Mount Crawford. The state highway continues east as four-lane divided Friedens Church Road to its eastern terminus at a diamond interchange with I-81. Friedens Church Road continues east as SR 682.

== Major intersections ==
The entire route is in Rockingham County.

| Location | mi | km | Destinations | Notes |
|---|---|---|---|---|
| | 0.00 | 0.00 | SR 902 (Tilghman Road) / SR 924 (Briery Branch Road) – Reddish Knob, Sugar Grove | |
| Dayton | 11.85 | 19.07 | SR 42 Bus. north (Main Street / SR 1211) | West end of concurrency with SR 42 Bus. |
| Dayton | 11.89 | 19.14 | SR 42 north (John Wayland Highway) – Harrisonburg | east end of SR 42 Bus. overlap; west end of concurrency with SR 42 |
| Bridgewater | 14.62 | 23.53 | SR 42 south (Main Street) – Churchville, Natural Chimneys | East end of concurrency with SR 42 |
| | 17.18 | 27.65 | US 11 (Valley Pike) – Harrisonburg, Staunton | |
| | 18.04 | 29.03 | I-81 / SR 682 (Friedens Church Road) – Harrisonburg, Staunton | Exit 240 (I-81) |
1.000 mi = 1.609 km; 1.000 km = 0.621 mi: Concurrency terminus

| < SR 812 | District 8 State Routes; 1928–1933 | SR 814 > |
| < SR 837 | District 8 State Routes; 1928–1933 | SR 839 > |
