= Mauzy =

Mauzy may refer to:

- MacKenzie Mauzy, an American actress
- Mauzy, Indiana
- Mauzy, Virginia
