= Rockingham County Fair =

Annual Fair held in Rockingham County, Virginia

The Rockingham County Fair has been dubbed by the Los Angeles Times as one of the best rural county fairs in the United States for the usual showcases that include: tractor pulls, a demolition derby, amusement rides, an antique auto show, a flea market, and country-western concerts. Local specialties brought to the fair are quince and crab apple jellies, gingerbread, peanut brittle, canned huckleberries and sauerkraut.

It is the state of Virginia's biggest agricultural county fair, featuring exhibitions and events devoted to the presentation and promotion of farm life and food production. The fair is held annually, just south of Harrisonburg, Virginia at the Rockingham County Fairgrounds on US Rt. 11. The fairgrounds account for 111 acres of land, a 21,000-square-foot (2,000 m^{2}) exhibit hall for display of local creative arts, homemaking skills and commercial exhibits, an 85,000 square feet (7,900 m^{2}) barn complex with a capacity of 1,100 head of hogs, sheep, beef cattle, dairy cattle and goats, a building for horticulture, and farm crop displays, the Virginia Poultry Industry Center, a building for poultry/rabbit exhibits, and food booths run by local civic clubs. There is also a grandstand, which seats 4,000 people, plus another 2,500 at ground level. The barn complex is approximately of space under-roof. There is parking on the grounds for over 7,000 cars.

The fairgrounds are used throughout the year for a variety of events including; fundraising activities, livestock breed shows, trade shows, exhibitions and community events.

The fair is a 22-time winner for Outstanding Program for Competitive Agricultural Exhibitions as judged by the International Association of Fairs and Expositions. Volunteers contribute over 13,000 hours of labor each year to ensure the success of the fair.

The Rockingham County Fair Association is a non-profit organization that manages the Rockingham County Fair. A board of directors is elected by the membership composed of 51 civic and service clubs from Rockingham County and the City of Harrisonburg, Virginia.

== History of the Fair ==
The first Rockingham County Fair was held at the Linville Ball Park, August 31 - September 3, 1949. Many, smaller fairs were held before 1949 at Ed's Park at Rawley Springs, and in Harrisonburg on the Whitesel-Sit lot and at the present location of Memorial Stadium. From 1950-1951, the fair was four days long, from 1952–1963, five days long, and from 1964 to 2019 & since 2021, the fair has run for six days.

The fair has been held at the present site on US Rt. 11 since 1980.

No fair was held in 2020.
