= Virginia statistical areas =

Coordinates: 37.5375°N 78.615°W

The U.S. State of Virginia currently has 19 statistical areas that have been delineated by the Office of Management and Budget (OMB). On July 21, 2023, the OMB delineated four combined statistical areas, 11 metropolitan statistical areas, and four micropolitan statistical areas in Virginia. As of 2023, the largest of these is the Washington-Baltimore-Arlington, DC-MD-VA-WV-PA CSA, comprising Washington, D.C. and its suburbs.

== Statistical areas ==
The Office of Management and Budget (OMB) has designated more than 1,000 statistical areas for the United States and Puerto Rico. These statistical areas are important geographic delineations of population clusters used by the OMB, the United States Census Bureau, planning organizations, and federal, state, and local government entities.

The OMB defines a core-based statistical area (commonly referred to as a CBSA) as the county or counties (or county-equivalents) surrounding at least one densely-settled core of at least 10,000 population, "plus adjacent counties having a high degree of social and economic integration with the core as measured through commuting ties with the counties containing the core". The OMB further divides core-based statistical areas based on population into metropolitan statistical areas (MSAs) for those with at least 50,000 and micropolitan statistical areas (μSAs) for those with 10,000 to 49,999 people.

The OMB defines a combined statistical area (CSA) as two or more adjacent core-based statistical areas where the employment interchange rate (% commuting from A to B plus % commuting from B to A) is at least 15%. The primary statistical areas (PSAs) include all combined statistical areas and any core-based statistical area that is not a constituent of a combined statistical area.

The 19 United States statistical areas, 95 counties and 38 independent cities of the State of Virginia (Note: An out-of-state area and its population are displayed in green. An area that extends into more than one state is displayed in purple. A purple population number over a black population number show the total population versus the in-state population. The state's abbreviation is also shown next to the in-state total.)
| Combined statistical area | 2025 population (est.) | Core-based statistical area | 2025 population (est.) | County | 2025 population (est.) | Metropolitan division | 2025 population (est.) |
|---|---|---|---|---|---|---|---|
| Washington-Baltimore-Arlington, DC-MD-VA-WV-PA CSA | 10,274,894; 3,322,462 (VA) | Washington-Arlington-Alexandria, DC-VA-MD-WV MSA | 6,465,724; 3,154,152 (VA) | Fairfax County, Virginia | 1,167,873 | Arlington-Alexandria-Reston, VA-WV MD | 3,247,647; 3,247,647 (VA) |
| Washington-Baltimore-Arlington, DC-MD-VA-WV-PA CSA | 10,274,894; 3,322,462 (VA) | Washington-Arlington-Alexandria, DC-VA-MD-WV MSA | 6,465,724; 3,154,152 (VA) | Prince William County, Virginia | 502,966 | Arlington-Alexandria-Reston, VA-WV MD | 3,247,647; 3,247,647 (VA) |
| Washington-Baltimore-Arlington, DC-MD-VA-WV-PA CSA | 10,274,894; 3,322,462 (VA) | Washington-Arlington-Alexandria, DC-VA-MD-WV MSA | 6,465,724; 3,154,152 (VA) | Loudoun County, Virginia | 449,749 | Arlington-Alexandria-Reston, VA-WV MD | 3,247,647; 3,247,647 (VA) |
| Washington-Baltimore-Arlington, DC-MD-VA-WV-PA CSA | 10,274,894; 3,322,462 (VA) | Washington-Arlington-Alexandria, DC-VA-MD-WV MSA | 6,465,724; 3,154,152 (VA) | Arlington County, Virginia | 243,931 | Arlington-Alexandria-Reston, VA-WV MD | 3,247,647; 3,247,647 (VA) |
| Washington-Baltimore-Arlington, DC-MD-VA-WV-PA CSA | 10,274,894; 3,322,462 (VA) | Washington-Arlington-Alexandria, DC-VA-MD-WV MSA | 6,465,724; 3,154,152 (VA) | City of Alexandria, Virginia | 160,662 | Arlington-Alexandria-Reston, VA-WV MD | 3,247,647; 3,247,647 (VA) |
| Washington-Baltimore-Arlington, DC-MD-VA-WV-PA CSA | 10,274,894; 3,322,462 (VA) | Washington-Arlington-Alexandria, DC-VA-MD-WV MSA | 6,465,724; 3,154,152 (VA) | Stafford County, Virginia | 170,803 | Arlington-Alexandria-Reston, VA-WV MD | 3,247,647; 3,247,647 (VA) |
| Washington-Baltimore-Arlington, DC-MD-VA-WV-PA CSA | 10,274,894; 3,322,462 (VA) | Washington-Arlington-Alexandria, DC-VA-MD-WV MSA | 6,465,724; 3,154,152 (VA) | Spotsylvania County, Virginia | 155,388 | Arlington-Alexandria-Reston, VA-WV MD | 3,247,647; 3,247,647 (VA) |
| Washington-Baltimore-Arlington, DC-MD-VA-WV-PA CSA | 10,274,894; 3,322,462 (VA) | Washington-Arlington-Alexandria, DC-VA-MD-WV MSA | 6,465,724; 3,154,152 (VA) | Fauquier County, Virginia | 76,503 | Arlington-Alexandria-Reston, VA-WV MD | 3,247,647; 3,247,647 (VA) |
| Washington-Baltimore-Arlington, DC-MD-VA-WV-PA CSA | 10,274,894; 3,322,462 (VA) | Washington-Arlington-Alexandria, DC-VA-MD-WV MSA | 6,465,724; 3,154,152 (VA) | Jefferson County, West Virginia | 63,102 | Arlington-Alexandria-Reston, VA-WV MD | 3,247,647; 3,247,647 (VA) |
| Washington-Baltimore-Arlington, DC-MD-VA-WV-PA CSA | 10,274,894; 3,322,462 (VA) | Washington-Arlington-Alexandria, DC-VA-MD-WV MSA | 6,465,724; 3,154,152 (VA) | Culpeper County, Virginia | 57,666 | Arlington-Alexandria-Reston, VA-WV MD | 3,247,647; 3,247,647 (VA) |
| Washington-Baltimore-Arlington, DC-MD-VA-WV-PA CSA | 10,274,894; 3,322,462 (VA) | Washington-Arlington-Alexandria, DC-VA-MD-WV MSA | 6,465,724; 3,154,152 (VA) | City of Manassas, Virginia | 44,332 | Arlington-Alexandria-Reston, VA-WV MD | 3,247,647; 3,247,647 (VA) |
| Washington-Baltimore-Arlington, DC-MD-VA-WV-PA CSA | 10,274,894; 3,322,462 (VA) | Washington-Arlington-Alexandria, DC-VA-MD-WV MSA | 6,465,724; 3,154,152 (VA) | Warren County, Virginia | 42,740 | Arlington-Alexandria-Reston, VA-WV MD | 3,247,647; 3,247,647 (VA) |
| Washington-Baltimore-Arlington, DC-MD-VA-WV-PA CSA | 10,274,894; 3,322,462 (VA) | Washington-Arlington-Alexandria, DC-VA-MD-WV MSA | 6,465,724; 3,154,152 (VA) | City of Fredericksburg, Virginia | 30,393 | Arlington-Alexandria-Reston, VA-WV MD | 3,247,647; 3,247,647 (VA) |
| Washington-Baltimore-Arlington, DC-MD-VA-WV-PA CSA | 10,274,894; 3,322,462 (VA) | Washington-Arlington-Alexandria, DC-VA-MD-WV MSA | 6,465,724; 3,154,152 (VA) | City of Fairfax, Virginia | 26,772 | Arlington-Alexandria-Reston, VA-WV MD | 3,247,647; 3,247,647 (VA) |
| Washington-Baltimore-Arlington, DC-MD-VA-WV-PA CSA | 10,274,894; 3,322,462 (VA) | Washington-Arlington-Alexandria, DC-VA-MD-WV MSA | 6,465,724; 3,154,152 (VA) | City of Manassas Park, Virginia | 16,560 | Arlington-Alexandria-Reston, VA-WV MD | 3,247,647; 3,247,647 (VA) |
| Washington-Baltimore-Arlington, DC-MD-VA-WV-PA CSA | 10,274,894; 3,322,462 (VA) | Washington-Arlington-Alexandria, DC-VA-MD-WV MSA | 6,465,724; 3,154,152 (VA) | Clarke County, Virginia | 15,609 | Arlington-Alexandria-Reston, VA-WV MD | 3,247,647; 3,247,647 (VA) |
| Washington-Baltimore-Arlington, DC-MD-VA-WV-PA CSA | 10,274,894; 3,322,462 (VA) | Washington-Arlington-Alexandria, DC-VA-MD-WV MSA | 6,465,724; 3,154,152 (VA) | City of Falls Church, Virginia | 15,159 | Arlington-Alexandria-Reston, VA-WV MD | 3,247,647; 3,247,647 (VA) |
| Washington-Baltimore-Arlington, DC-MD-VA-WV-PA CSA | 10,274,894; 3,322,462 (VA) | Washington-Arlington-Alexandria, DC-VA-MD-WV MSA | 6,465,724; 3,154,152 (VA) | Rappahannock County, Virginia | 7,439 | Arlington-Alexandria-Reston, VA-WV MD | 3,247,647; 3,247,647 (VA) |
| Washington-Baltimore-Arlington, DC-MD-VA-WV-PA CSA | 10,274,894; 3,322,462 (VA) | Washington-Arlington-Alexandria, DC-VA-MD-WV MSA | 6,465,724; 3,154,152 (VA) | Prince George's County, Maryland | 970,374 | Washington, DC-MD MD | 1,840,612 |
| Washington-Baltimore-Arlington, DC-MD-VA-WV-PA CSA | 10,274,894; 3,322,462 (VA) | Washington-Arlington-Alexandria, DC-VA-MD-WV MSA | 6,465,724; 3,154,152 (VA) | District of Columbia | 693,645 | Washington, DC-MD MD | 1,840,612 |
| Washington-Baltimore-Arlington, DC-MD-VA-WV-PA CSA | 10,274,894; 3,322,462 (VA) | Washington-Arlington-Alexandria, DC-VA-MD-WV MSA | 6,465,724; 3,154,152 (VA) | Charles County, Maryland | 176,593 | Washington, DC-MD MD | 1,840,612 |
| Washington-Baltimore-Arlington, DC-MD-VA-WV-PA CSA | 10,274,894; 3,322,462 (VA) | Washington-Arlington-Alexandria, DC-VA-MD-WV MSA | 6,465,724; 3,154,152 (VA) | Montgomery County, Maryland | 1,074,582 | Frederick-Gaithersburg-Bethesda, MD MD | 1,377,465 |
| Washington-Baltimore-Arlington, DC-MD-VA-WV-PA CSA | 10,274,894; 3,322,462 (VA) | Washington-Arlington-Alexandria, DC-VA-MD-WV MSA | 6,465,724; 3,154,152 (VA) | Frederick County, Maryland | 302,883 | Frederick-Gaithersburg-Bethesda, MD MD | 1,377,465 |
| Washington-Baltimore-Arlington, DC-MD-VA-WV-PA CSA | 10,274,894; 3,322,462 (VA) | Baltimore-Towson, MD MSA | 2,857,781 | Baltimore County, Maryland | 847,650 | none | |
| Washington-Baltimore-Arlington, DC-MD-VA-WV-PA CSA | 10,274,894; 3,322,462 (VA) | Baltimore-Towson, MD MSA | 2,857,781 | Anne Arundel County, Maryland | 603,380 | none | |
| Washington-Baltimore-Arlington, DC-MD-VA-WV-PA CSA | 10,274,894; 3,322,462 (VA) | Baltimore-Towson, MD MSA | 2,857,781 | Baltimore City, Maryland | 569,997 | none | |
| Washington-Baltimore-Arlington, DC-MD-VA-WV-PA CSA | 10,274,894; 3,322,462 (VA) | Baltimore-Towson, MD MSA | 2,857,781 | Howard County, Maryland | 339,183 | none | |
| Washington-Baltimore-Arlington, DC-MD-VA-WV-PA CSA | 10,274,894; 3,322,462 (VA) | Baltimore-Towson, MD MSA | 2,857,781 | Harford County, Maryland | 266,446 | none | |
| Washington-Baltimore-Arlington, DC-MD-VA-WV-PA CSA | 10,274,894; 3,322,462 (VA) | Baltimore-Towson, MD MSA | 2,857,781 | Carroll County, Maryland | 176,677 | none | |
| Washington-Baltimore-Arlington, DC-MD-VA-WV-PA CSA | 10,274,894; 3,322,462 (VA) | Baltimore-Towson, MD MSA | 2,857,781 | Queen Anne's County, Maryland | 54,448 | none | |
| Washington-Baltimore-Arlington, DC-MD-VA-WV-PA CSA | 10,274,894; 3,322,462 (VA) | Hagerstown-Martinsburg, MD-WV MSA | 315,280 | Washington County, Maryland | 157,731 | none | |
| Washington-Baltimore-Arlington, DC-MD-VA-WV-PA CSA | 10,274,894; 3,322,462 (VA) | Hagerstown-Martinsburg, MD-WV MSA | 315,280 | Berkeley County, West Virginia | 139,522 | none | |
| Washington-Baltimore-Arlington, DC-MD-VA-WV-PA CSA | 10,274,894; 3,322,462 (VA) | Hagerstown-Martinsburg, MD-WV MSA | 315,280 | Morgan County, West Virginia | 18,027 | none | |
| Washington-Baltimore-Arlington, DC-MD-VA-WV-PA CSA | 10,274,894; 3,322,462 (VA) | Lexington Park, MD MSA | 211,176 | St. Mary's County, Maryland | 116,692 | none | |
| Washington-Baltimore-Arlington, DC-MD-VA-WV-PA CSA | 10,274,894; 3,322,462 (VA) | Lexington Park, MD MSA | 211,176 | Calvert County, Maryland | 94,484 | none | |
| Washington-Baltimore-Arlington, DC-MD-VA-WV-PA CSA | 10,274,894; 3,322,462 (VA) | Chambersburg, PA MSA | 160,652 | Franklin County, Pennsylvania | 160,652 | none | |
| Washington-Baltimore-Arlington, DC-MD-VA-WV-PA CSA | 10,274,894; 3,322,462 (VA) | Winchester, VA-WV MSA | 152,332; 128,227 (VA) | Frederick County, Virginia | 99,955 | none | |
| Washington-Baltimore-Arlington, DC-MD-VA-WV-PA CSA | 10,274,894; 3,322,462 (VA) | Winchester, VA-WV MSA | 152,332; 128,227 (VA) | City of Winchester, Virginia | 28,272 | none | |
| Washington-Baltimore-Arlington, DC-MD-VA-WV-PA CSA | 10,274,894; 3,322,462 (VA) | Winchester, VA-WV MSA | 152,332; 128,227 (VA) | Hampshire County, West Virginia | 24,105 | none | |
| Washington-Baltimore-Arlington, DC-MD-VA-WV-PA CSA | 10,274,894; 3,322,462 (VA) | Lake of the Woods, VA μSA | 40,083 | Orange County, Virginia | 40,083 | none | |
| Washington-Baltimore-Arlington, DC-MD-VA-WV-PA CSA | 10,274,894; 3,322,462 (VA) | Easton, MD μSA | 38,238 | Talbot County, Maryland | 38,238 | none | |
| Washington-Baltimore-Arlington, DC-MD-VA-WV-PA CSA | 10,274,894; 3,322,462 (VA) | Cambridge, MD μSA | 33,628 | Dorchester County, Maryland | 33,628 | none | |
| Virginia Beach-Chesapeake, VA-NC CSA | 1,877,659; 1,742,506(VA) | Virginia Beach-Chesapeake-Norfolk, VA-NC MSA | 1,797,213; 1,742,506 (VA) | City of Virginia Beach, Virginia | 453,737 | none | |
| Virginia Beach-Chesapeake, VA-NC CSA | 1,877,659; 1,742,506(VA) | Virginia Beach-Chesapeake-Norfolk, VA-NC MSA | 1,797,213; 1,742,506 (VA) | City of Chesapeake, Virginia | 255,332 | none | |
| Virginia Beach-Chesapeake, VA-NC CSA | 1,877,659; 1,742,506(VA) | Virginia Beach-Chesapeake-Norfolk, VA-NC MSA | 1,797,213; 1,742,506 (VA) | City of Norfolk, Virginia | 231,013 | none | |
| Virginia Beach-Chesapeake, VA-NC CSA | 1,877,659; 1,742,506(VA) | Virginia Beach-Chesapeake-Norfolk, VA-NC MSA | 1,797,213; 1,742,506 (VA) | City of Newport News, Virginia | 183,230 | none | |
| Virginia Beach-Chesapeake, VA-NC CSA | 1,877,659; 1,742,506(VA) | Virginia Beach-Chesapeake-Norfolk, VA-NC MSA | 1,797,213; 1,742,506 (VA) | City of Hampton, Virginia | 137,315 | none | |
| Virginia Beach-Chesapeake, VA-NC CSA | 1,877,659; 1,742,506(VA) | Virginia Beach-Chesapeake-Norfolk, VA-NC MSA | 1,797,213; 1,742,506 (VA) | City of Portsmouth, Virginia | 96,777 | none | |
| Virginia Beach-Chesapeake, VA-NC CSA | 1,877,659; 1,742,506(VA) | Virginia Beach-Chesapeake-Norfolk, VA-NC MSA | 1,797,213; 1,742,506 (VA) | City of Suffolk, Virginia | 104,699 | none | |
| Virginia Beach-Chesapeake, VA-NC CSA | 1,877,659; 1,742,506(VA) | Virginia Beach-Chesapeake-Norfolk, VA-NC MSA | 1,797,213; 1,742,506 (VA) | James City County, Virginia | 83,326 | none | |
| Virginia Beach-Chesapeake, VA-NC CSA | 1,877,659; 1,742,506(VA) | Virginia Beach-Chesapeake-Norfolk, VA-NC MSA | 1,797,213; 1,742,506 (VA) | York County, Virginia | 71,374 | none | |
| Virginia Beach-Chesapeake, VA-NC CSA | 1,877,659; 1,742,506(VA) | Virginia Beach-Chesapeake-Norfolk, VA-NC MSA | 1,797,213; 1,742,506 (VA) | Gloucester County, Virginia | 40,097 | none | |
| Virginia Beach-Chesapeake, VA-NC CSA | 1,877,659; 1,742,506(VA) | Virginia Beach-Chesapeake-Norfolk, VA-NC MSA | 1,797,213; 1,742,506 (VA) | Isle of Wight County, Virginia | 41,321 | none | |
| Virginia Beach-Chesapeake, VA-NC CSA | 1,877,659; 1,742,506(VA) | Virginia Beach-Chesapeake-Norfolk, VA-NC MSA | 1,797,213; 1,742,506 (VA) | Currituck County, North Carolina | 33,158 | none | |
| Virginia Beach-Chesapeake, VA-NC CSA | 1,877,659; 1,742,506(VA) | Virginia Beach-Chesapeake-Norfolk, VA-NC MSA | 1,797,213; 1,742,506 (VA) | City of Williamsburg, Virginia | 15,861 | none | |
| Virginia Beach-Chesapeake, VA-NC CSA | 1,877,659; 1,742,506(VA) | Virginia Beach-Chesapeake-Norfolk, VA-NC MSA | 1,797,213; 1,742,506 (VA) | City of Poquoson, Virginia | 13,292 | none | |
| Virginia Beach-Chesapeake, VA-NC CSA | 1,877,659; 1,742,506(VA) | Virginia Beach-Chesapeake-Norfolk, VA-NC MSA | 1,797,213; 1,742,506 (VA) | Gates County, North Carolina | 10,234 | none | |
| Virginia Beach-Chesapeake, VA-NC CSA | 1,877,659; 1,742,506(VA) | Virginia Beach-Chesapeake-Norfolk, VA-NC MSA | 1,797,213; 1,742,506 (VA) | Camden County, North Carolina | 11,315 | none | |
| Virginia Beach-Chesapeake, VA-NC CSA | 1,877,659; 1,742,506(VA) | Virginia Beach-Chesapeake-Norfolk, VA-NC MSA | 1,797,213; 1,742,506 (VA) | Mathews County, Virginia | 8,529 | none | |
| Virginia Beach-Chesapeake, VA-NC CSA | 1,877,659; 1,742,506(VA) | Virginia Beach-Chesapeake-Norfolk, VA-NC MSA | 1,797,213; 1,742,506 (VA) | Surry County, Virginia | 6,603 | none | |
| Virginia Beach-Chesapeake, VA-NC CSA | 1,877,659; 1,742,506(VA) | Elizabeth City, NC μSA | 42,201 | Pasquotank County, North Carolina | 42,201 | none | |
| Virginia Beach-Chesapeake, VA-NC CSA | 1,877,659; 1,742,506(VA) | Kill Devil Hills, NC μSA | 38,245 | Dare County, North Carolina | 38,245 | none | |
| none | | Richmond, VA MSA | 1,389,338 | Chesterfield County, Virginia | 397,148 | none | |
| none | | Richmond, VA MSA | 1,389,338 | Henrico County, Virginia | 342,775 | none | |
| none | | Richmond, VA MSA | 1,389,338 | City of Richmond, Virginia | 237,257 | none | |
| none | | Richmond, VA MSA | 1,389,338 | Hanover County, Virginia | 116,423 | none | |
| none | | Richmond, VA MSA | 1,389,338 | Prince George County, Virginia | 43,936 | none | |
| none | | Richmond, VA MSA | 1,389,338 | City of Petersburg, Virginia | 33,734 | none | |
| none | | Richmond, VA MSA | 1,389,338 | Powhatan County, Virginia | 32,591 | none | |
| none | | Richmond, VA MSA | 1,389,338 | Dinwiddie County, Virginia | 28,896 | none | |
| none | | Richmond, VA MSA | 1,389,338 | Goochland County, Virginia | 29,187 | none | |
| none | | Richmond, VA MSA | 1,389,338 | New Kent County, Virginia | 28,022 | none | |
| none | | Richmond, VA MSA | 1,389,338 | City of Hopewell, Virginia | 23,261 | none | |
| none | | Richmond, VA MSA | 1,389,338 | King William County, Virginia | 19,617 | none | |
| none | | Richmond, VA MSA | 1,389,338 | City of Colonial Heights, Virginia | 18,738 | none | |
| none | | Richmond, VA MSA | 1,389,338 | Amelia County, Virginia | 13,632 | none | |
| none | | Richmond, VA MSA | 1,389,338 | Sussex County, Virginia | 10,755 | none | |
| none | | Richmond, VA MSA | 1,389,338 | King and Queen County, Virginia | 6,743 | none | |
| none | | Richmond, VA MSA | 1,389,338 | Charles City County, Virginia | 6,623 | none | |
| none | | Roanoke, VA MSA | 316,547 | City of Roanoke, Virginia | 99,111 | none | |
| none | | Roanoke, VA MSA | 316,547 | Roanoke County, Virginia | 97,150 | none | |
| none | | Roanoke, VA MSA | 316,547 | Franklin County, Virginia | 55,526 | none | |
| none | | Roanoke, VA MSA | 316,547 | Botetourt County, Virginia | 34,144 | none | |
| none | | Roanoke, VA MSA | 316,547 | City of Salem, Virginia | 25,816 | none | |
| none | | Roanoke, VA MSA | 316,547 | Craig County, Virginia | 4,800 | none | |
| Harrisonburg-Staunton-Stuarts Draft, VA CSA | 269,847 | Harrisonburg, VA MSA | 140,155 | Rockingham County, Virginia | 89,316 | none | |
| Harrisonburg-Staunton-Stuarts Draft, VA CSA | 269,847 | Harrisonburg, VA MSA | 140,155 | City of Harrisonburg, Virginia | 50,839 | none | |
| Harrisonburg-Staunton-Stuarts Draft, VA CSA | 269,847 | Staunton-Stuarts Draft, VA MSA | 129,692 | Augusta County, Virginia | 78,940 | none | |
| Harrisonburg-Staunton-Stuarts Draft, VA CSA | 269,847 | Staunton-Stuarts Draft, VA MSA | 129,692 | City of Staunton, Virginia | 26,801 | none | |
| Harrisonburg-Staunton-Stuarts Draft, VA CSA | 269,847 | Staunton-Stuarts Draft, VA MSA | 129,692 | City of Waynesboro, Virginia | 23,951 | none | |
| none | | Lynchburg, VA MSA | 269,169 | Bedford County, Virginia | 83,059 | none | |
| none | | Lynchburg, VA MSA | 269,169 | City of Lynchburg, Virginia | 81,347 | none | |
| none | | Lynchburg, VA MSA | 269,169 | Campbell County, Virginia | 55,629 | none | |
| none | | Lynchburg, VA MSA | 269,169 | Amherst County, Virginia | 31,962 | none | |
| none | | Lynchburg, VA MSA | 269,169 | Appomattox County, Virginia | 17,172 | none | |
| none | | Charlottesville, VA MSA | 228,597 | Albemarle County, Virginia | 118,356 | none | |
| none | | Charlottesville, VA MSA | 228,597 | City of Charlottesville, Virginia | 44,388 | none | |
| none | | Charlottesville, VA MSA | 228,597 | Fluvanna County, Virginia | 28,975 | none | |
| none | | Charlottesville, VA MSA | 228,597 | Greene County, Virginia | 21,958 | none | |
| none | | Charlottesville, VA MSA | 228,597 | Nelson County, Virginia | 14,920 | none | |
| none | | Blacksburg-Christiansburg-Radford, VA MSA | 181,616 | Montgomery County, Virginia | 98,434 | none | |
| none | | Blacksburg-Christiansburg-Radford, VA MSA | 181,616 | Pulaski County, Virginia | 33,586 | none | |
| none | | Blacksburg-Christiansburg-Radford, VA MSA | 181,616 | City of Radford, Virginia | 17,243 | none | |
| none | | Blacksburg-Christiansburg-Radford, VA MSA | 181,616 | Giles County, Virginia | 16,564 | none | |
| none | | Blacksburg-Christiansburg-Radford, VA MSA | 181,616 | Floyd County, Virginia | 15,789 | none | |
| none | | Danville, VA μSA | 101,137 | Pittsylvania County, Virginia | 59,490 | none | |
| none | | Danville, VA μSA | 101,137 | City of Danville, Virginia | 41,647 | none | |
| Johnson City-Kingsport-Bristol, TN-VA CSA | 605,081; 91,516 (VA) | Kingsport-Bristol, TN-VA MSA | 314,834; 91,516 (VA) | Sullivan County, Tennessee | 163,759 | none | |
| Johnson City-Kingsport-Bristol, TN-VA CSA | 605,081; 91,516 (VA) | Kingsport-Bristol, TN-VA MSA | 314,834; 91,516 (VA) | Hawkins County, Tennessee | 59,559 | none | |
| Johnson City-Kingsport-Bristol, TN-VA CSA | 605,081; 91,516 (VA) | Kingsport-Bristol, TN-VA MSA | 314,834; 91,516 (VA) | Washington County, Virginia | 53,898 | none | |
| Johnson City-Kingsport-Bristol, TN-VA CSA | 605,081; 91,516 (VA) | Kingsport-Bristol, TN-VA MSA | 314,834; 91,516 (VA) | Scott County, Virginia | 21,200 | none | |
| Johnson City-Kingsport-Bristol, TN-VA CSA | 605,081; 91,516 (VA) | Kingsport-Bristol, TN-VA MSA | 314,834; 91,516 (VA) | City of Bristol, Virginia | 16,418 | none | |
| Johnson City-Kingsport-Bristol, TN-VA CSA | 605,081; 91,516 (VA) | Johnson City, TN MSA | 216,416 | Washington County, Tennessee | 141,199 | none | |
| Johnson City-Kingsport-Bristol, TN-VA CSA | 605,081; 91,516 (VA) | Johnson City, TN MSA | 216,416 | Carter County, Tennessee | 57,361 | none | |
| Johnson City-Kingsport-Bristol, TN-VA CSA | 605,081; 91,516 (VA) | Johnson City, TN MSA | 216,416 | Unicoi County, Tennessee | 17,856 | none | |
| Johnson City-Kingsport-Bristol, TN-VA CSA | 605,081; 91,516 (VA) | Greeneville, TN μSA | 73,831 | Greene County, Tennessee | 73,831 | none | |
| none | | Martinsville, VA μSA | 63,091 | Henry County, Virginia | 49,242 | none | |
| none | | Martinsville, VA μSA | 63,091 | City of Martinsville, Virginia | 13,849 | none | |
| none | | Bluefield, WV-VA μSA | 96,138; 38,635 (VA) | Mercer County, West Virginia | 57,503 | none | |
| none | | Bluefield, WV-VA μSA | 96,138; 38,635 (VA) | Tazewell County, Virginia | 38,635 | none | |
| none | | none | | Shenandoah County, Virginia | 45,839 | none | |
| none | | none | | Louisa County, Virginia | 42,924 | none | |
| none | | none | | Wise County, Virginia | 34,824 | none | |
| none | | none | | Halifax County, Virginia | 33,447 | none | |
| none | | none | | Accomack County, Virginia | 33,859 | none | |
| none | | none | | Caroline County, Virginia | 34,413 | none | |
| none | | none | | Mecklenburg County, Virginia | 30,747 | none | |
| none | | none | | Carroll County, Virginia | 29,299 | none | |
| none | | none | | Smyth County, Virginia | 28,882 | none | |
| none | | none | | King George County, Virginia | 29,646 | none | |
| none | | none | | Wythe County, Virginia | 27,983 | none | |
| none | | none | | Russell County, Virginia | 25,332 | none | |
| none | | none | | Page County, Virginia | 23,762 | none | |
| none | | none | | Rockbridge County, Virginia | 22,663 | none | |
| none | | none | | Prince Edward County, Virginia | 22,391 | none | |
| none | | none | | Lee County, Virginia | 21,642 | none | |
| none | | none | | Buchanan County, Virginia | 18,492 | none | |
| none | | none | | Westmoreland County, Virginia | 19,715 | none | |
| none | | none | | Southampton County, Virginia | 18,110 | none | |
| none | | none | | Patrick County, Virginia | 17,424 | none | |
| none | | none | | Buckingham County, Virginia | 17,137 | none | |
| none | | none | | Brunswick County, Virginia | 15,727 | none | |
| none | | none | | Nottoway County, Virginia | 15,796 | none | |
| none | | none | | Grayson County, Virginia | 15,230 | none | |
| none | | none | | Alleghany County, Virginia | 14,546 | none | |
| none | | none | | Madison County, Virginia | 14,237 | none | |
| none | | none | | Dickenson County, Virginia | 13,236 | none | |
| none | | none | | Northumberland County, Virginia | 12,557 | none | |
| none | | none | | Lunenburg County, Virginia | 12,058 | none | |
| none | | none | | Northampton County, Virginia | 11,879 | none | |
| none | | none | | Charlotte County, Virginia | 11,401 | none | |
| none | | none | | Greensville County, Virginia | 11,181 | none | |
| none | | none | | Middlesex County, Virginia | 10,841 | none | |
| none | | none | | Lancaster County, Virginia | 10,995 | none | |
| none | | none | | Essex County, Virginia | 10,654 | none | |
| none | | none | | Cumberland County, Virginia | 10,352 | none | |
| none | | none | | Richmond County, Virginia | 9,294 | none | |
| none | | none | | City of Franklin, Virginia | 8,478 | none | |
| none | | none | | City of Lexington, Virginia | 7,528 | none | |
| none | | none | | City of Galax, Virginia | 6,670 | none | |
| none | | none | | City of Buena Vista, Virginia | 6,672 | none | |
| none | | none | | Bland County, Virginia | 6,151 | none | |
| none | | none | | City of Covington, Virginia | 5,680 | none | |
| none | | none | | City of Emporia, Virginia | 5,447 | none | |
| none | | none | | Bath County, Virginia | 4,076 | none | |
| none | | none | | City of Norton, Virginia | 3,477 | none | |
| none | | none | | Highland County, Virginia | 2,318 | none | |
| Commonwealth of Virginia | | | | | 8,880,107 | none | |

The 15 core-based statistical areas of the Commonwealth of Virginia (Note: For CBSAs comprising populations from multiple states, they are listed twice to show both their intrastate population within that CBSA as well as the CBSA's total population. Only the intrastate population is ranked.)
| 2025 rank | Core-based statistical area | Population | | | | |
| 2025 rank | Core-based statistical area | 2025 estimate | Change | 2020 Census | Change | 2010 Census |
|---|---|---|---|---|---|---|
| 1 | Washington-Arlington-Alexandria, DC-VA-MD-WV MSA (VA) | 3,154,152 | +2.95% | 3,063,700 | +14.44% | 2,677,141 |
| 2 | Virginia Beach-Norfolk-Newport News, VA-NC MSA (VA) | 1,742,506 | +0.66% | 1,731,126 | +5.04% | 1,648,136 |
| 3 | Richmond, VA MSA | 1,389,338 | +5.70% | 1,314,434 | +10.78% | 1,186,501 |
| 4 | Roanoke, VA MSA | 316,547 | +0.41% | 315,251 | +2.12% | 308,707 |
| 5 | Lynchburg, VA MSA | 269,169 | +2.90% | 261,593 | +6.16% | 246,412 |
| 6 | Charlottesville, VA MSA | 228,597 | +3.19% | 221,524 | +9.91% | 201,559 |
| 7 | Blacksburg-Christiansburg-Radford, VA MSA | 181,616 | −0.13% | 181,854 | +2.03% | 178,237 |
| 8 | Harrisonburg, VA MSA | 140,155 | +3.38% | 135,571 | +8.26% | 125,228 |
| 9 | Staunton-Stuarts Draft, VA MSA | 129,692 | +3.40% | 125,433 | +5.85% | 118,502 |
| 10 | Winchester, VA-WV MSA (VA) | 128,227 | +7.27% | 119,539 | +14.38% | 104,508 |
| 11 | Danville, VA μSA | 101,137 | −1.90% | 103,091 | −3.26% | 106,561 |
| 12 | Kingsport-Bristol, TN-VA MSA (VA) | 91,516 | −1.31% | 92,730 | −3.29% | 95,888 |
| 13 | Martinsville, VA μSA | 63,091 | −2.08% | 64,433 | −5.21% | 67,972 |
| 14 | Bluefield, WV-VA μSA (VA) | 38,635 | −4.44% | 40,429 | −10.31% | 45,078 |
| 15 | Lake of the Woods, VA μSA | 40,083 | +10.56% | 36,254 | +8.28% | 33,481 |
| | Bluefield, WV-VA μSA | 96,138 | −3.95% | 100,093 | −6.75% | 107,342 |
| | Kingsport-Bristol, TN-VA MSA | 314,834 | +2.35% | 307,614 | −0.62% | 309,544 |
| | Virginia Beach-Norfolk-Newport News, VA-NC MSA | 1,797,213 | 0.00% | 1,797,213 | +6.10% | 1,693,860 |
| | Washington-Arlington-Alexandria, DC-VA-MD-WV MSA | 6,465,724 | +2.98% | 6,278,542 | +13.18% | 5,547,495 |
| | Winchester, VA-WV MSA | 152,332 | +6.80% | 142,632 | +11.02% | 128,472 |

The four combined statistical areas of the Commonwealth of Virginia (Note: For CSAs comprising populations from multiple states, they are listed twice to show both their intrastate population within that CSA as well as the CSA's total population. Only the intrastate population is ranked.)
| 2025 rank | Combined statistical area | Population | | | | |
| 2025 rank | Combined statistical area | 2025 estimate | Change | 2020 Census | Change | 2010 Census |
|---|---|---|---|---|---|---|
| 1 | Washington-Baltimore-Arlington, DC-MD-VA-WV-PA CSA (VA) | 3,322,462 | +3.20% | 3,219,493 | +14.36% | 2,815,130 |
| 2 | Virginia Beach-Norfolk, VA-NC CSA (VA) | 1,742,506 | +0.66% | 1,731,126 | +5.04% | 1,648,136 |
| 3 | Harrisonburg-Staunton-Stuarts Draft, VA CSA | 269,847 | +3.39% | 261,004 | +7.09% | 243,730 |
| 4 | Johnson City-Kingsport-Bristol, TN-VA CSA (VA) | 91,516 | −1.31% | 92,730 | −3.29% | 95,888 |
| | Johnson City-Kingsport-Bristol, TN-VA CSA | 605,081 | +3.42% | 585,051 | +1.38% | 577,091 |
| | Virginia Beach-Norfolk, VA-NC CSA | 1,877,659 | +1.08% | 1,857,542 | +5.04% | 1,768,441 |
| | Washington-Baltimore-Arlington, DC-MD-VA-WV-PA CSA | 10,274,894 | +2.46% | 10,028,331 | +10.17% | 9,102,983 |

== See also ==
- Geography of Virginia
  - Demographics of Virginia
