= Lilly, Virginia =

Lilly
- Unincorporated community
- Location in Virginia Lilly (the United States)
- Coordinates: 38°28′2″N 79°0′52″W
- Country: United States
- State: Virginia
- County: Rockingham County

Lilly is an unincorporated community located in Rockingham County, in the U.S. state of Virginia. It is located west of Harrisonburg along Route 613, northeast of Clover Hill, near the edge of the George Washington National Forest.
