= Inglewood, Rockingham County, Virginia =

Unincorporated community in Virginia, US

Coordinates: 38°23′25″N 78°39′53″W

Inglewood is an unincorporated community in Rockingham County, Virginia, United States. It is located northwest of Berrytown.

Inglewood is part of the Harrisonburg Metropolitan Statistical Area.

== See also ==
- Inglewood, Mecklenburg County, Virginia
