= Mount Clinton, Virginia =

Mount Clinton
- Unincorporated community
- Location in Virginia Mount Clinton (the United States)
- Coordinates: 38°35′19″N 78°46′15″W
- Country: United States
- State: Virginia
- County: Rockingham County

Mount Clinton is an unincorporated community located in Rockingham County, in the U.S. state of Virginia. It is located five miles west of Harrisonburg. There are several Mennonite churches in the vicinity, one of which is located along the access road to the west. It is also two miles north of Hinton.
