= Yankeetown, Virginia =

Yankeetown
- Unincorporated community
- Location in Virginia Yankeetown (the United States)
- Coordinates: 38°40′15″N 78°56′26″W
- Country: United States
- State: Virginia
- County: Rockingham

Yankeetown is an unincorporated community located in Rockingham County, in the U.S. state of Virginia.

== Geography ==
It is located just northwest of Fulks Run in George Washington National Forest, along Virginia State Route 259.

Location of Yankeetown within the Rockingham County
