= Fulks Run, Virginia =

Fulks Run
- Unincorporated community
- Location in Virginia Fulks Run (the United States)
- Coordinates: 38°39′24″N 78°53′59″W
- Country: United States
- State: Virginia
- County: Rockingham County
- Elevation: 1,161 ft (354 m)

Fulks Run is an unincorporated community located in Rockingham County, Virginia, United States. It is located north of Harrisonburg and south of Bergton just to the west of Broadway on route 259, near the border of West Virginia and the edge of George Washington National Forest. The North Fork Shenandoah River flows past the community. It includes Fulks Run Elementary School. The Fulks Run Ruritan Park is a popular get-together spot with a baseball field.

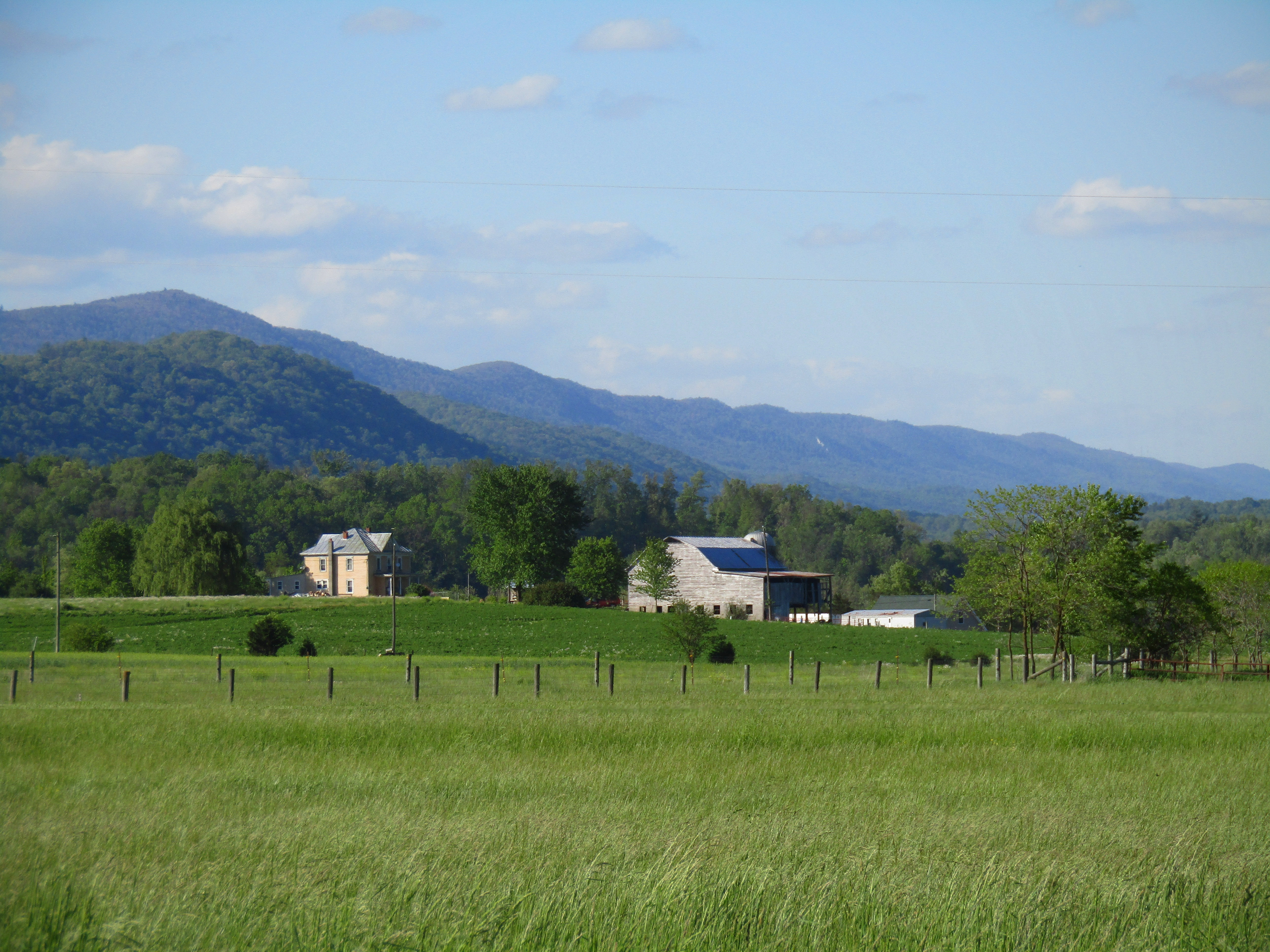
Western view of Shenendoah Mountains

Fulks Run would have been inundated by the reservoir of the Brocks Gap Dam, proposed in the 1940s and 1960s. Determined local opposition defeated the dam project.
