= Turleytown, Virginia =

Turleytown
- Unincorporated community
- Location in Virginia Turleytown (the United States)
- Coordinates: 38°36′50.43″N 78°52′16.09″W
- Country: United States
- State: Virginia
- County: Rockingham County
- Elevation: 1,270 ft (387 m)
- GNIS feature ID: 1493724

Turleytown is an unincorporated community located in Rockingham County, in the U.S. state of Virginia.

== Geography ==
The community is located west of Broadway, along State Route 613.

Location of Turleytown within the Rockingham County

== History ==
Turleytown is believed to be named after Giles Turley, who visited it in 1804.
