= Stemphleytown, Virginia =

Stemphleytown
- Unincorporated community
- Location in Virginia Stemphleytown (the United States)
- Coordinates: 38°24′39″N 78°57′31″W
- Country: United States
- State: Virginia
- County: Rockingham

Stemphleytown is an unincorporated community located in Rockingham County, in the U.S. state of Virginia.

== Geography ==
The community is located two miles west of Dayton, along Virginia State Route 257.

Location of Stemphleytown within the Rockingham County
