= Rawley Springs, Virginia =

Rawley Springs
- Unincorporated community
- Location in Virginia Rawley Springs (the United States)
- Coordinates: 38°30′19″N 79°3′23″W
- Country: United States
- State: Virginia
- County: Rockingham County

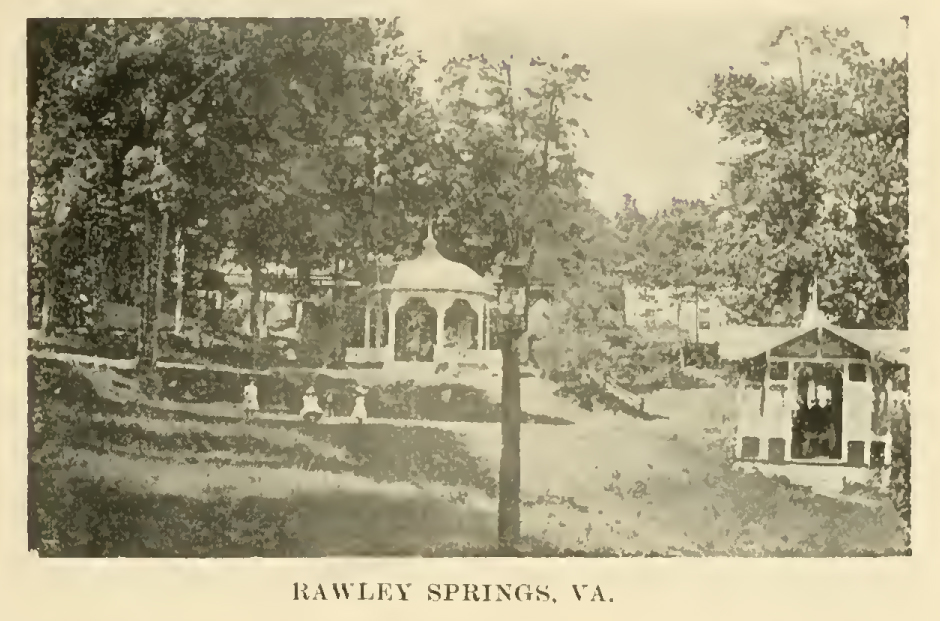
Rawley Springs, Virginia, circa 1909

Rawley Springs is an unincorporated community located in Rockingham County, in the U.S. state of Virginia.

== Geography ==
The community is located nine miles west of Harrisonburg, north of Clover Hill, along U.S. Route 33, near the George Washington National Forest. It lies on the Dry River and is situated on the southern slope of the North Mountain.

Location of Rawley Springs within the Rockingham County
