= Keezletown, Virginia =

Keezletown
- Census-designated place
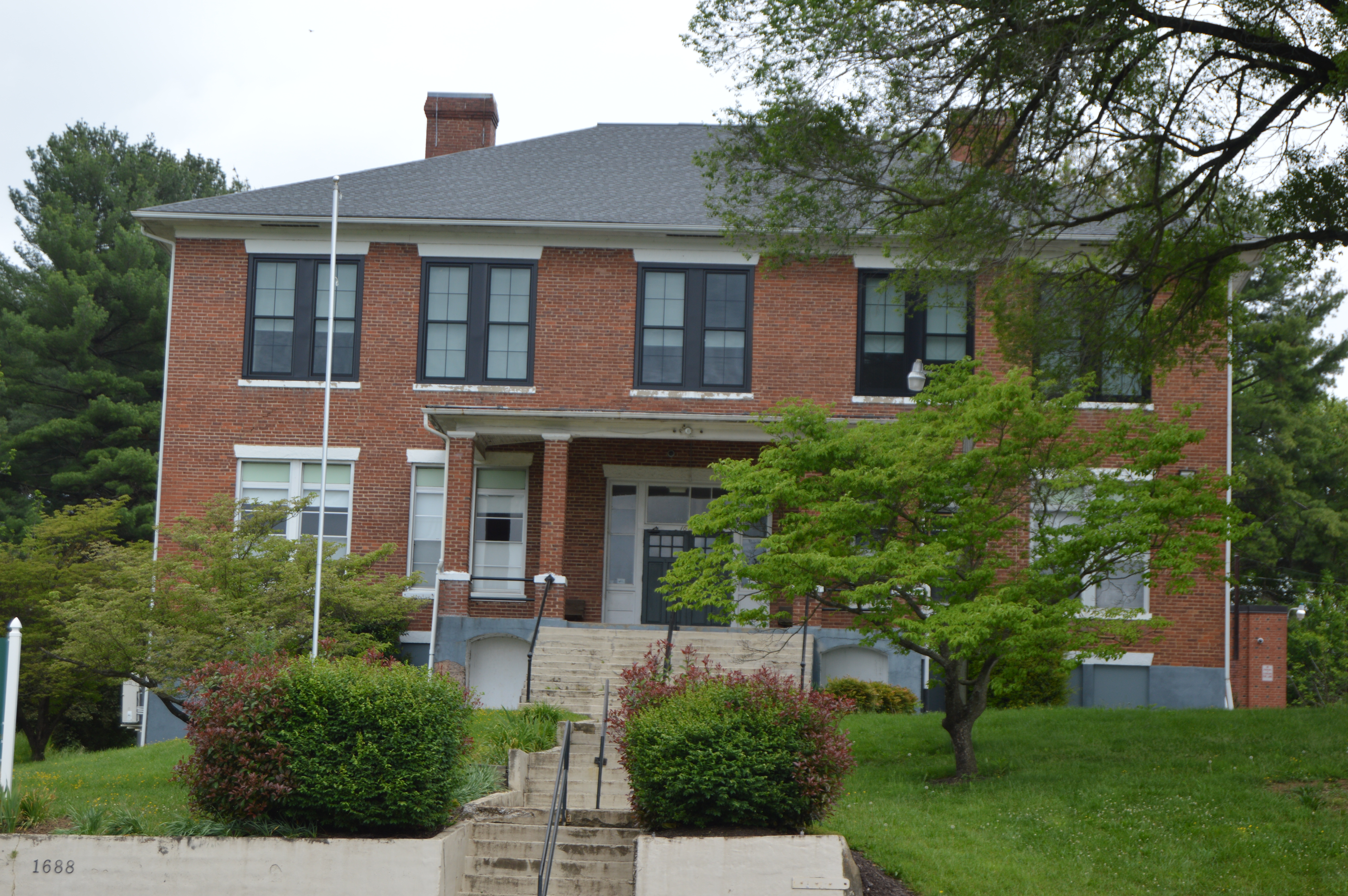
- Redeemer Classical School

- Location of the Keezletown CDP within the Rockingham County

- Location in Virginia Keezletown (the United States)
- Coordinates: 38°24′53″N 78°48′8″W
- Country: United States
- State: Virginia
- County: Rockingham County
- Elevation: 1,299 ft (396 m)

Population (2020 Census)
  - Total: 369
- FIPS code: 51-41624
- GNIS feature ID: 2807438

Keezletown is a census-designated place in Rockingham County, in the U.S. state of Virginia. It is located northeast of Harrisonburg. As of the 2020 census, Keezletown had a population of 369.

== Demographics ==
Keezletown first appeared as a census designated place in the 2020 United States census.
