= Tenth Legion, Virginia =

Tenth Legion
- Unincorporated community
- Location in Virginia Tenth Legion (the United States)
- Coordinates: 38°34′38.43″N 78°43′53.08″W
- Country: United States
- State: Virginia
- County: Rockingham
- Elevation: 1,122 ft (342 m)
- GNIS feature ID: 1500211

Tenth Legion is an unincorporated community in Rockingham County, Virginia, United States.

== Geography ==
Tenth Legion is located near Interstate 81, approximately 4.4 mi southeast of the town of Broadway.

Location of Tenth Legion within the Rockingham County
