= Penn Laird, Virginia =

- Unincorporated community
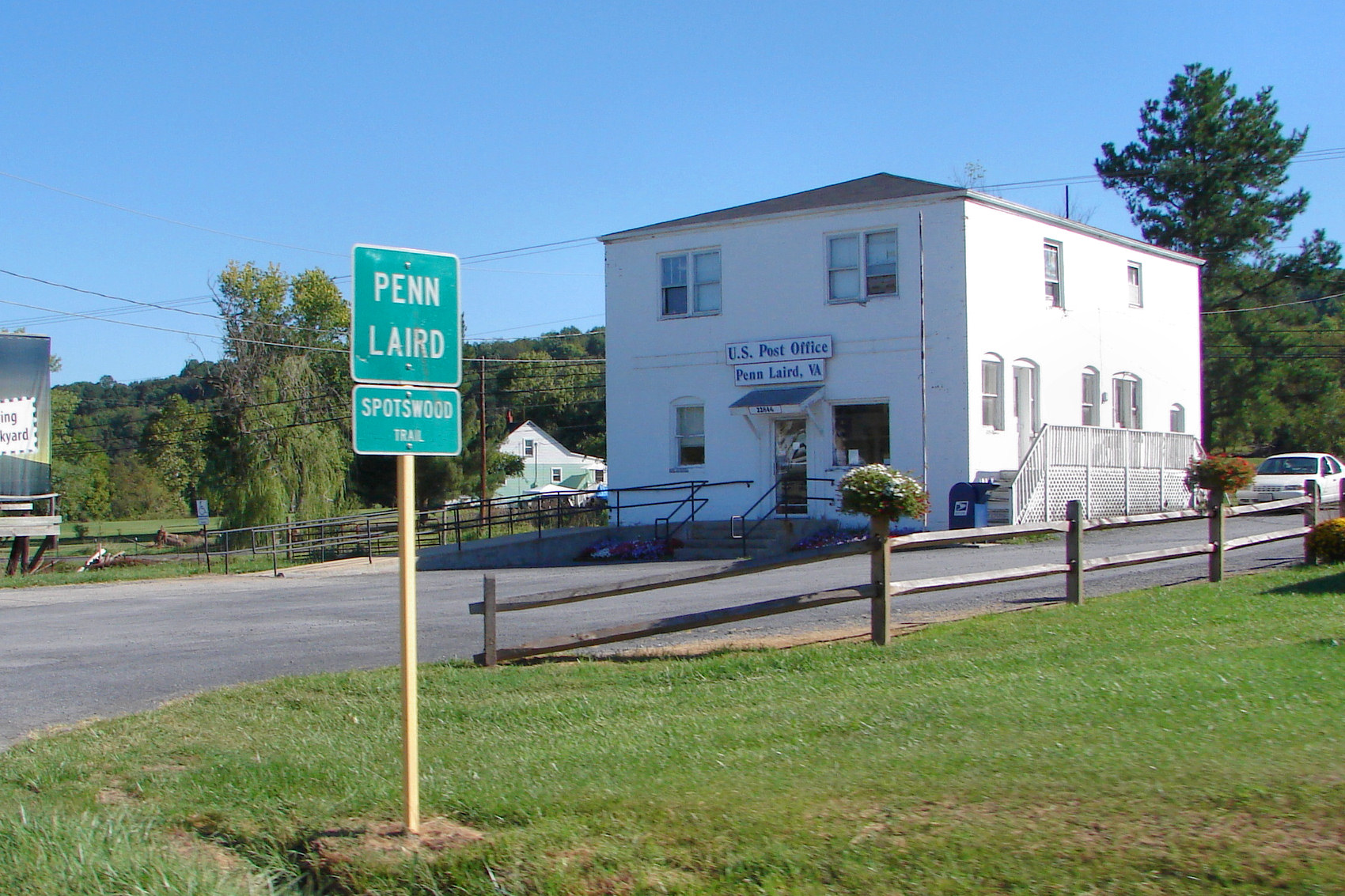

- Location within Virginia Location within the United States
- Coordinates: 38°23′08″N 78°48′09″W
- Country: United States
- State: Virginia
- County: Rockingham
- Elevation: 1,204 ft (367 m)
- Time zone: UTC-5 (Eastern (EST))
  - Summer (DST): UTC-4 (EDT)
- ZIP code: 22846
- Area code: 540
- GNIS feature ID: 1496071

Penn Laird is an unincorporated community in Rockingham County, Virginia, United States.

== Geography ==
Penn Laird is located on U.S. Route 33, 5.7 miles (9.2 km) southeast of Harrisonburg.

Location of Penn Laird within the Rockingham County

== History ==
Penn Laird has a post office with ZIP code 22846, which opened on July 18, 1896. Ruth Kathleen Funkhouser Armstrong states the name Penn Laird came from the two middle names of Harold Roudabush's father, William Penn Roudabush and Harold's Wife father, whose middle name was Laird.
