= Mayland, Virginia =

Mayland
- Unincorporated community
- Location in Virginia Mayland (the United States)
- Coordinates: 38°35′19″N 78°46′15″W
- Country: United States
- State: Virginia
- County: Rockingham County

Mayland is an unincorporated community located in Rockingham County, in the U.S. state of Virginia. It is located southeast of Broadway, along Route 259. Mayland used to have its own post office, but now the post office has been moved to Broadway. Broadway is near Harrisonburg, Harrisonburg is in the Shenandoah Valley.
