= Montezuma, Virginia =

Montezuma
- Unincorporated community
- Location in Virginia Montezuma (the United States)
- Coordinates: 38°24′33″N 78°59′17″W
- Country: United States
- State: Virginia
- County: Rockingham County

Montezuma is an unincorporated community located in Rockingham County, in the U.S. state of Virginia.

== Geography ==
It is located northwest of Bridgewater.

Location of Montezuma within the Rockingham County
