= Bridgewater, Virginia =

- Town
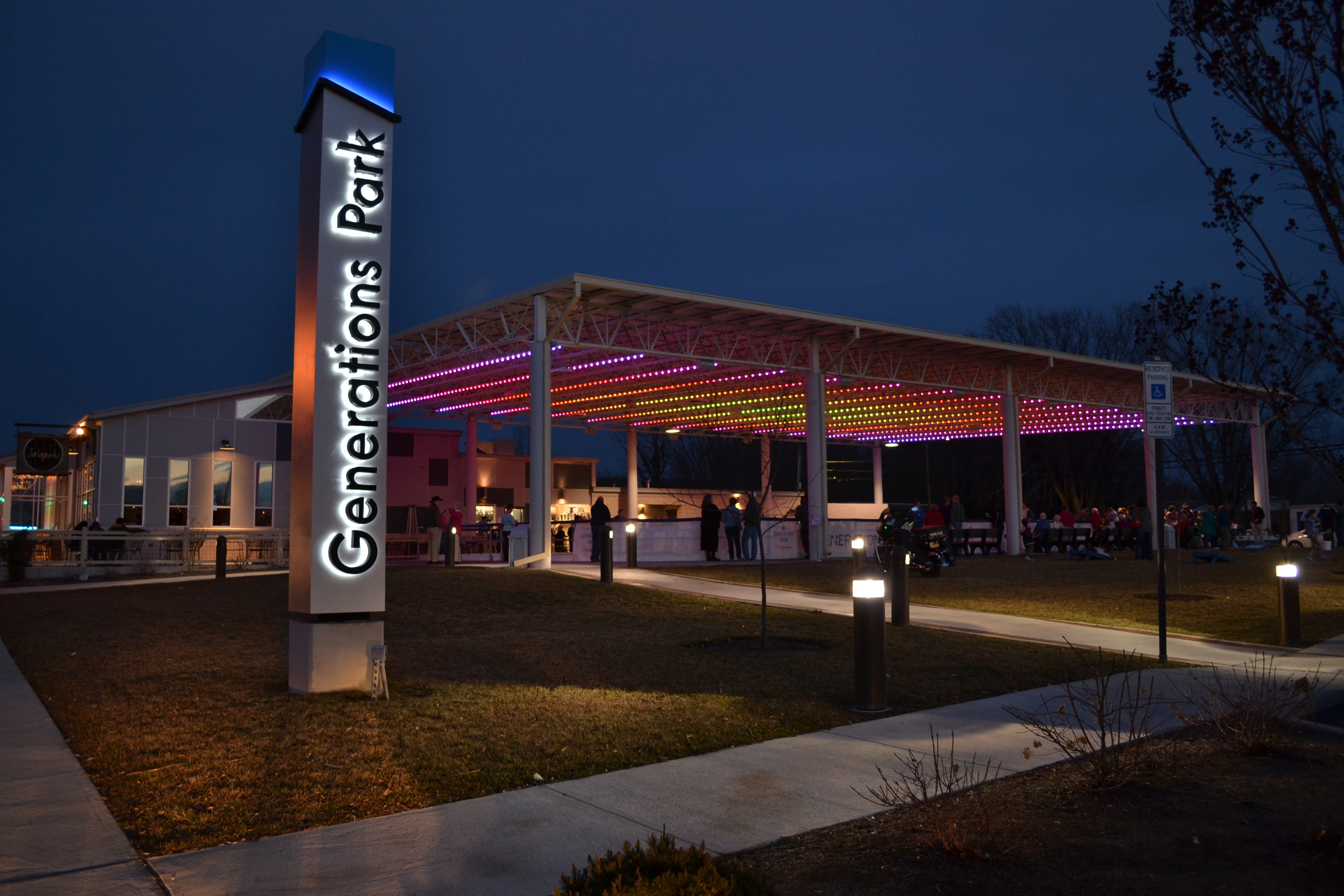
- Generations Park in Bridgewater, Virginia

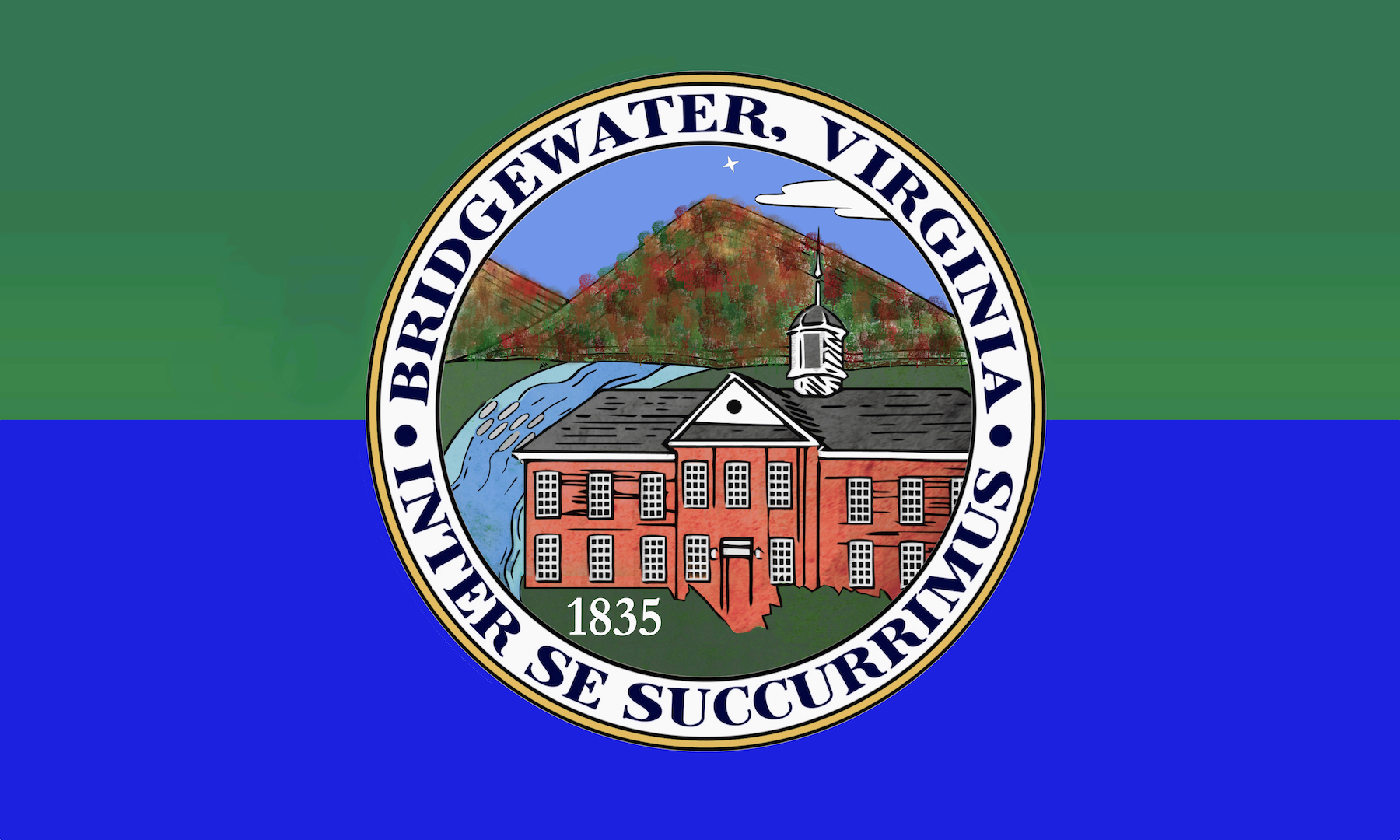
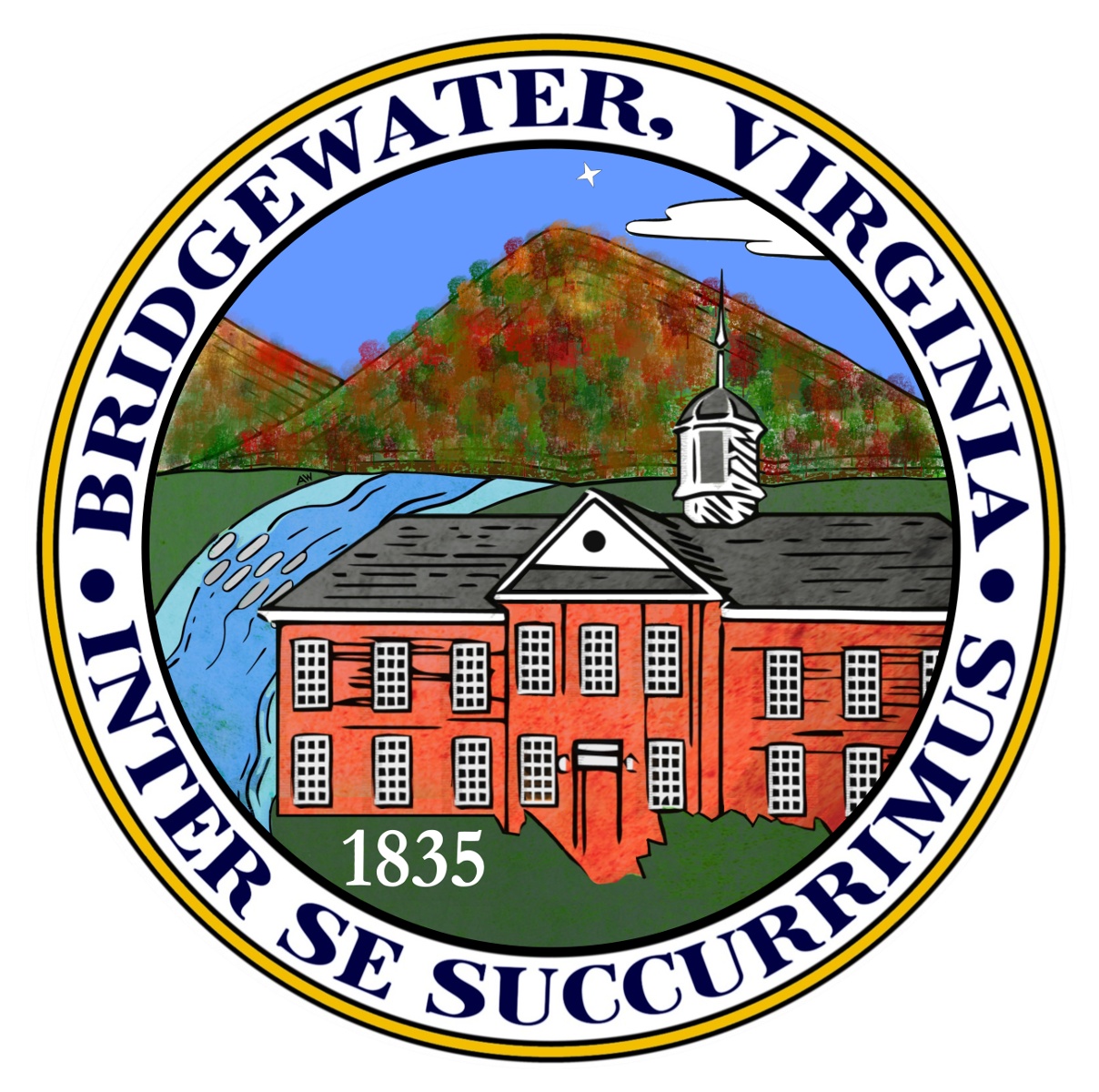
- Flag Seal
- Motto: Inter Se Succurrimus ("Enriching One Another")
- Location of Bridgewater within the Rockingham County

- Location in Virginia Bridgewater, Virginia (the United States)
- Coordinates: 38°23′12″N 78°58′11″W
- Country: United States
- State: Virginia
- County: Rockingham
- Founded: 1835

Government
  - Mayor: Ted Flory

Area
  - Total: 2.53 sq mi (6.54 km^{2})
  - Land: 2.52 sq mi (6.53 km^{2})
  - Water: 0.0039 sq mi (0.01 km^{2})
- Elevation: 1,178 ft (359 m)

Population (2020)
  - Total: 6,596
  - Density: 16,365/sq mi (6,318.7/km^{2})
- Time zone: UTC−5 (Eastern (EST))
  - Summer (DST): UTC−4 (EDT)
- ZIP code: 22812
- Area code(s): 540 & 826
- FIPS code: 51-09656
- GNIS feature ID: 1492628
- Website: Official website

Bridgewater is an incorporated town in Rockingham County, Virginia, United States. The population was 6,596 at the 2020 census. It is included in the Harrisonburg, Virginia Metropolitan Statistical Area.

== History ==
William Magill first settled along the North River in 1746, and the area became known as Magill's Ford.

According to the Harrisonburg-Rockingham Historical Society, the book History of Rockingham County, Virginia said John Dinkle built a carding mill there around 1810 and the settlement came to be called Dinkletown. By 1815, the Dinkle family additionally had a sawmill, stave mill, and gristmill in operation and opened the Dinkle Tavern on South Main Street (SR 42) in a brick house that still stands. Dinkle is also spelled Dinkel; the current town's main east–west street (SR 257) still carries the name Dinkel Avenue within the town limits.

The first bridge across the North River was built in 1820 along the town's north–south axis (present-day SR 42 / Main Street); and, for a time, the young community was known as Bridgeport.

The Town received its charter from the Virginia General Assembly on February 7, 1835, then incorporated as Bridgewater. Every February 7, the town holds an annual Charter Day celebration to commemorate the granting of the charter.

Bridgewater College is located within the town, and was first established in 1880. The college has grown along with the town, now enrolling more than 1,800 students.

Since the creation of the town in 1835, Bridgewater has endured six major floods, including a devastating flood in 1949 that claimed two lives. As a result, the US Army Corps of Engineers constructed a long earthen levee to protect large portions of the town against future flooding.

Since the mid-1990s, the town has held a "Summer's End Celebration" on Labor Day each year. The event has grown to include a 5k race, carnival rides, and live music, and is attended by thousands of people.

== Geography ==
According to the United States Census Bureau, the town has a total area of 2.52 sq mi (6.5 km^{2}), nearly all land. Most of the town is located within a bend of the North River near the confluence with Dry River. Floods have wrecked the town occasionally. The northern areas are partly shielded from flooding with an Army Corps of Engineers levee. The wooded monadnock called Round Hill (elevation approx. 1750 feet) dominates the town's western skyline.

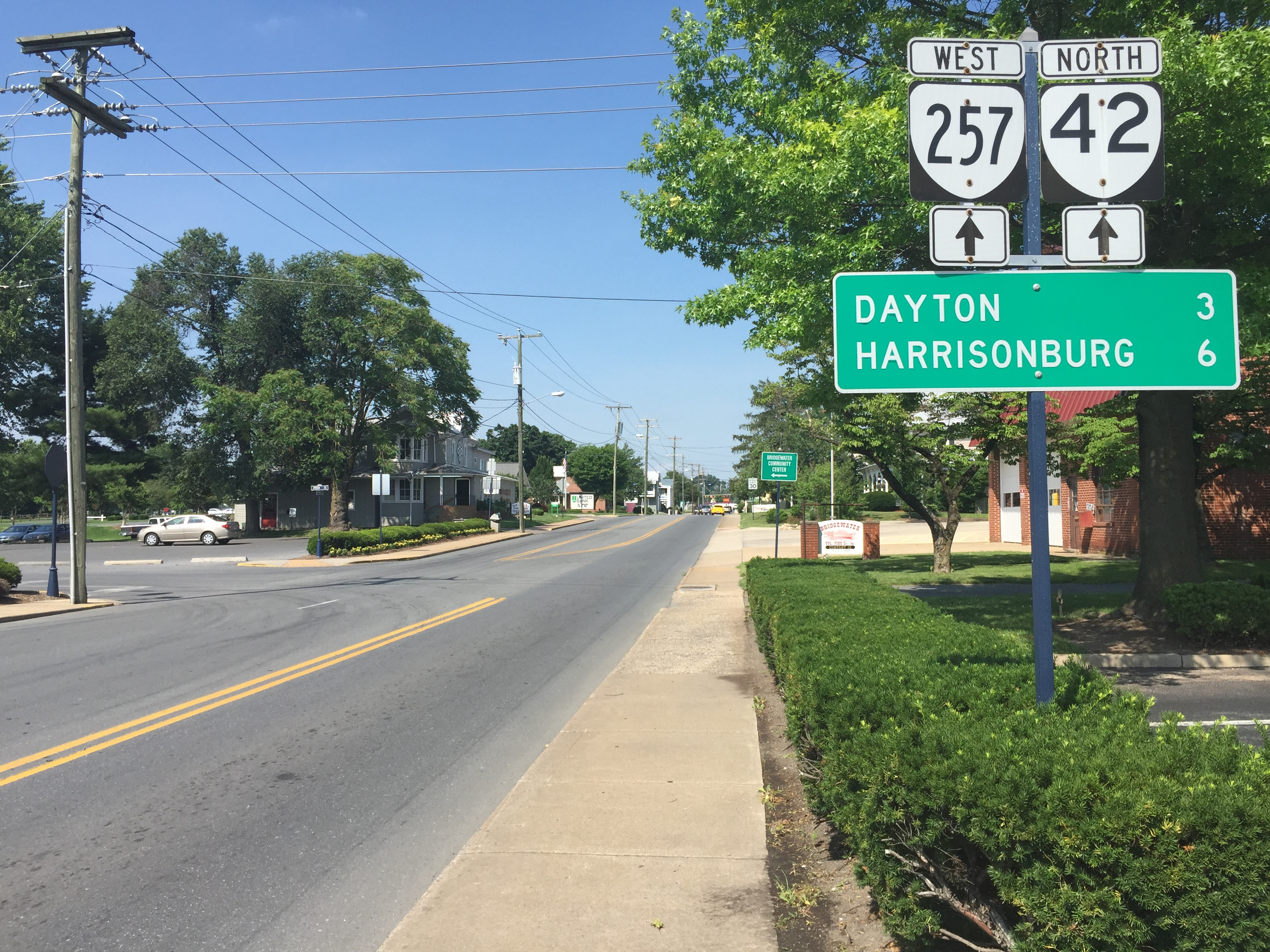
View north along SR 42 and west along SR 257 in Bridgewater

== Transportation ==
The main highways providing access to Bridgewater are Virginia State Route 42 and Virginia State Route 257. These two highways overlap from Bridgewater northwards to Dayton. SR 42 runs north–south and connects with U.S. Route 33 in Harrisonburg. SR 257 runs east–west and connects with Interstate 81 near Mount Crawford.

== Demographics ==
Historical population
Census	Pop.	Note	%±
1880	390		—
1900	384		—
1910	859		123.7%
1920	914		6.4%
1930	951		4.0%
1940	993		4.4%
1950	1,537		54.8%
1960	1,815		18.1%
1970	2,828		55.8%
1980	3,289		16.3%
1990	3,918		19.1%
2000	5,203		32.8%
2010	5,644		8.5%
2020	6,596		16.9%
U.S. Decennial Census

As of the 2020 census, 6,596 people, 2,137 households in the town. The population density was 2,618.5 people per square mile (941.7/km^{2}). The racial makeup of the town was 89.0% White, 5.2% African American, with no other races exceeding one percent. For comparison, the 2010 census reflected a population 92.2% White and 2.4% African American. Hispanic or Latino of any race were 4.1% of the population in 2020, down from 4.9% in 2010.

According to the 2011-2015 American Community Survey 5-year estimates, the median income for a household in the town was $55,205, and for a family was $62,483. Males had a median income of $45,533 versus $36,919 for females. The per capita income for the town was $24,854. About 4.7% of families and 5.4% of the population were below the poverty line, including 6.7% of those under age 18 and 3.8% of those age 65 or over.

== Community policing and safety ==
Chief Phillip Read leads a ten-officer police department, which also polices the town of Mt. Crawford. Bridgewater consistently ranks in the top 10 safest communities in Virginia. Most recently, Bridgewater was ranked #2 by Safewise in their “Virginia’s 20 Safest Cities of 2020” based on the town's low “violent crimes per capita” and “property crimes per capita” as listed in the FBI's Uniform Crime Report. Bridgewater also is frequently ranked as one of the best places to live in Virginia, most recently ranked #3 in “Best Places to Live in Virginia for 2020” by HomeSnacks. Bridgewater's police department puts an emphasis on community policing.

== Parks and recreation ==
The Town of Bridgewater is home to 13 parks, totaling almost 100 acres. The parks provide everything from picnic shelters, BBQ grills, riverwalks and fishing, bird watching, a fitness trail, playgrounds, tennis courts, and athletic fields. The parks and recreation also include a nine-hole golf course and an 18-hole miniature golf course, an arboretum, and an ice skating rink.

=== Generations Park ===
Opened in 2015, Generations Park features ice skating during the winter season. Ice skating season begins on Thanksgiving Day and is open daily through the beginning of March. The skating is free for all town residents who present a B-Rec pass. A nominal fee is charged for non-residents. Throughout the rest of the year, Generations Park is home to pickleball courts and hosts the After Dark at Gen Park concert series and Eve of Independence celebration.

=== Sandy Bottom Par-3 and Mini-Golf ===
Located at 610 East College St., Sandy Bottom Park is home to Bridgewater's Par-3 nine-hole golf course, and an 18-hole miniature golf course. The park facilities also include a practice green, restrooms, several picnic tables, two gazebos, and ample parking. The Par-3 and Mini-Golf remain open from April 1 through October 31. The courses are free for all town residents who present a B-Rec pass. A nominal fee is charged for non-residents. Mini-Golf is also available for private parties.

=== Oakdale Park ===
The biggest and busiest of the town parks, Oakdale is home to the Summer's End Celebration as well as the North River Library and the Bridgewater Little League Program. The park has three picnic areas (Shelter Nos. 1 and 2 each have 10 tables, and Shelter No. 3 has 16 tables with restroom facilities attached). Park amenities include a basketball court, a four-square court, football/soccer field and walking track, two playgrounds (one for preschool children, the other for school-aged children), BBQ grills and water spigots at the shelters, four horseshoe pits, plenty of off-street parking, and open areas to run and play. Baseball field #4 is available for public use.

==== Other park features ====
- Bridgeview Park: home to quarter mile fitness walking trail, children's fitness center, and riverfront bench swings.

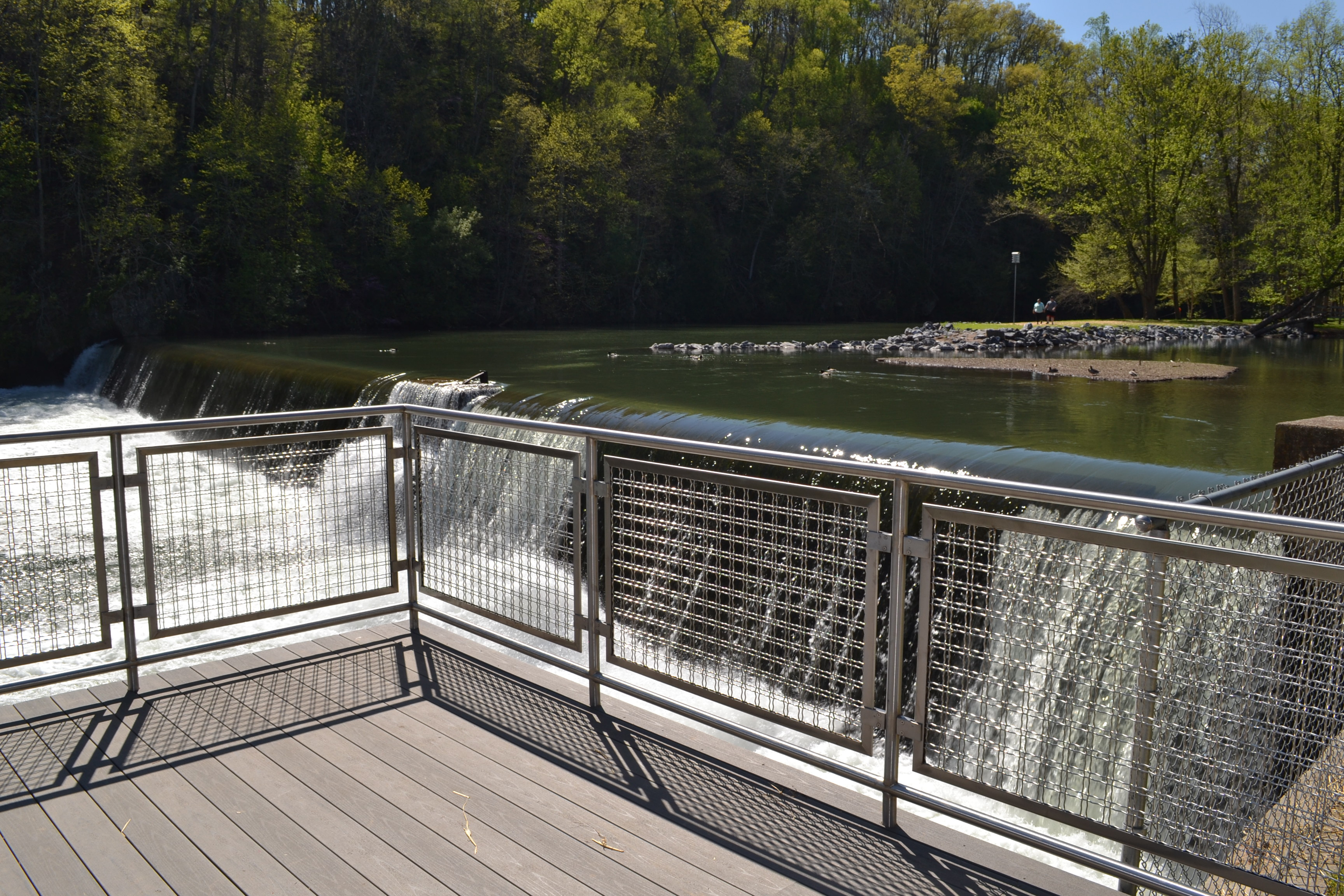
Downrush Vista at Wildwood Park

- Edgebriar Park: has a handicap-accessible fishing pier, backgammon and chess inlaid game tables, a water garden with a waterfall and a variety of fish and plants, riverfront swings, a gazebo, and a Civil War historical marker.
- Wildwood Park: allows fishing and includes a playground, wooded trails, picnic shelter, BBQ grill, and a platform called Downrush Vista overlooking the North River.
- Wynant Park: this small pocket park has a playground, hammock, and picnic table.
- Bird Sanctuary: with 3/4 of an acre, this park has quiet seclusion and shelter provided by trees and shrubs for bird watching.
- Dinkel-Harris Gateway at Warm Springs Turnpike Park: details the historical significance of what was once known as the Warm Springs Turnpike.
- Cooks Creek Arboretum: this eight-acre park includes many trees planted by Bridgewater's Turner Ashby High School students, a walking path, and several picnic tables.
- Harrison Park: home to the Doug Will Tennis Center with two indoor tennis courts and two pickleball courts as well as an outdoor basketball court and playground.
- Whitelow Park: named for Bridgewater resident Carlyle Whitelow, this park includes a walking trail, play structure, gaga pit, and swing set.
- Veterans Park: a memorial park honoring Bridgewater veterans.

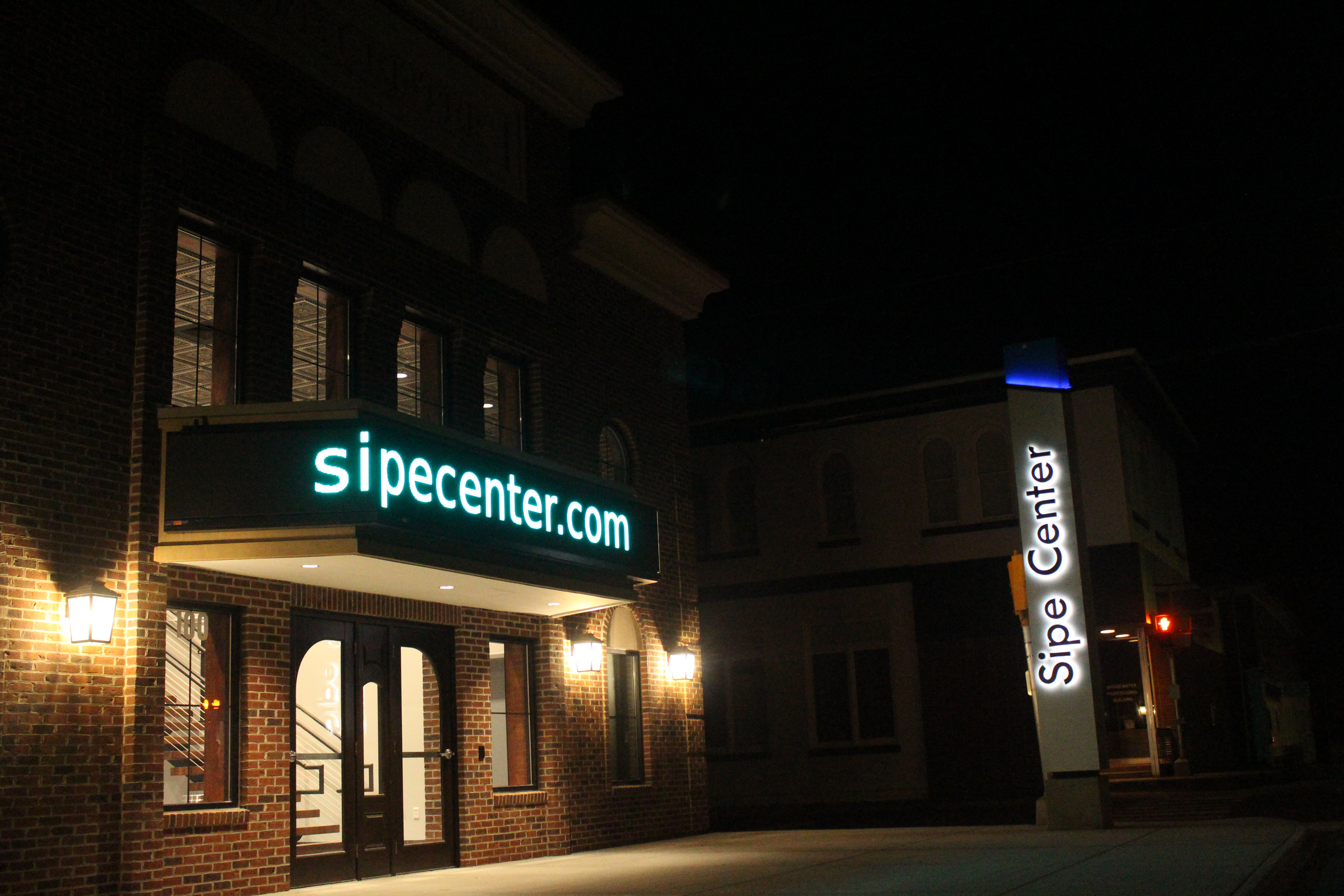
Sipe Center, 100 North Main Street

== Sipe Center ==
In 2019, Bridgewater opened the Sipe Center as a performing arts venue, movie theater, and municipal meeting hall. In 2017, the town purchased the deteriorated 19th-century W.H. Sipe Company, Inc. building (located at the intersection of Main and College streets) and, due to the old wooden hulk's structural issues, demolished it. The Sipe Center, which replaced the old building, is a purpose-built multi-use theater with some exterior decorative elements inspired by the original Sipe building. Sipe Center shows weekly movies and hosts diverse monthly performances including live music, magic shows, and children's theatre. The town council meetings are also held in the Sipe Center.

== See also ==
- Shenandoah Valley
- Rockingham County, Virginia
