= Criders, Virginia =

Criders
- Unincorporated community
- Location in Virginia Criders (the United States)
- Coordinates: 38°45′14″N 79°1′21″W
- Country: United States
- State: Virginia
- County: Rockingham County
- Elevation: 1,612 ft (491 m)

Criders is an unincorporated community located in Rockingham County, in the U.S. state of Virginia. It is located in George Washington National Forest, west of Bergton near the state border with West Virginia.
