= Dale Enterprise, Virginia =

- Unincorporated community
- Location within Virginia Location within the United States
- Coordinates: 38°27′18″N 78°56′20″W
- Country: United States
- State: Virginia
- County: Rockingham
- Elevation: 1,408 ft (429 m)
- Time zone: UTC-5 (Eastern (EST))
  - Summer (DST): UTC-4 (EDT)
- Area code: 540
- GNIS feature ID: 1492833

Dale Enterprise is an unincorporated community in Rockingham County, Virginia, United States. The name dates to 1872, when it was time to name the village's post office. The place was previously known as Millersville, after the Miller family who ran an early store there. After the Civil War, Mr. J. W. Minnick started a new mercantile “enterprise” at the crossroads of Silver Lake Road and Route 33. Minnick’s store was located near a “dale,” so the chosen name became Dale Enterprise.

== Geography ==
Dale Enterprise is located at latitude 38.455 N and longitude 78.939 W in the Shenandoah Valley, approximately four miles west of the City of Harrisonburg along U.S. Highway 33 (the Rawley Pike).,, The community is shown on the Bridgewater U.S. Geological Survey Map and is in the Eastern time zone.

Dale Enterprise sits at an elevation of 1408 feet, on the northeastern foot of the 1898-foot high Mole Hill, an igneous intrusion that is believed to have been the core of a volcano that has eroded away over the years.

== Climate ==
Typical of the Shenandoah Valley, Dale Enterprise is situated in the transition between a humid subtropical climate and humid continental climate (Köppen Cfa and Dfa, respectively). The normal monthly mean temperature ranges from 32.4 °F (0.2 °C) in January to 74.8 °F (23.8 °C) in July. Record temperatures range from −25 °F (−32 °C) on January 14, 1912, up to 105 °F (41 °C) as recently as January 6, 1999.

Climate data for Dale Enterprise, Virginia (1,358 ft or 414 m AMSL), 1991–2020 normals, extremes 1893–present
Month	Jan	Feb	Mar	Apr	May	Jun	Jul	Aug	Sep	Oct	Nov	Dec	Year
Record high °F (°C)	78 (26)	79 (26)	91 (33)	97 (36)	97 (36)	102 (39)	105 (41)	104 (40)	101 (38)	94 (34)	84 (29)	78 (26)	105 (41)
Mean maximum °F (°C)	63.7 (17.6)	65.9 (18.8)	74.6 (23.7)	83.6 (28.7)	88.2 (31.2)	93.0 (33.9)	94.5 (34.7)	92.9 (33.8)	89.6 (32.0)	83.0 (28.3)	73.5 (23.1)	64.6 (18.1)	95.5 (35.3)
Mean daily maximum °F (°C)	42.1 (5.6)	46.1 (7.8)	53.6 (12.0)	64.7 (18.2)	73.5 (23.1)	82.0 (27.8)	86.0 (30.0)	84.3 (29.1)	77.8 (25.4)	66.8 (19.3)	55.7 (13.2)	46.0 (7.8)	64.9 (18.3)
Daily mean °F (°C)	32.4 (0.2)	34.8 (1.6)	42.0 (5.6)	52.2 (11.2)	61.9 (16.6)	70.8 (21.6)	74.8 (23.8)	73.2 (22.9)	66.3 (19.1)	54.9 (12.7)	44.1 (6.7)	36.0 (2.2)	53.6 (12.0)
Mean daily minimum °F (°C)	22.7 (−5.2)	23.6 (−4.7)	30.4 (−0.9)	39.6 (4.2)	50.3 (10.2)	59.7 (15.4)	63.7 (17.6)	62.1 (16.7)	54.8 (12.7)	43.0 (6.1)	32.5 (0.3)	26.0 (−3.3)	42.4 (5.8)
Mean minimum °F (°C)	4.2 (−15.4)	7.5 (−13.6)	14.2 (−9.9)	25.4 (−3.7)	34.8 (1.6)	46.9 (8.3)	52.9 (11.6)	51.0 (10.6)	40.8 (4.9)	27.6 (−2.4)	18.4 (−7.6)	11.1 (−11.6)	1.9 (−16.7)
Record low °F (°C)	−25 (−32)	−22 (−30)	−6 (−21)	10 (−12)	24 (−4)	32 (0)	41 (5)	39 (4)	26 (−3)	15 (−9)	2 (−17)	−16 (−27)	−25 (−32)
Average precipitation inches (mm)	2.71 (69)	2.22 (56)	3.21 (82)	3.27 (83)	4.02 (102)	3.93 (100)	4.08 (104)	3.81 (97)	3.74 (95)	2.50 (64)	2.60 (66)	2.91 (74)	39.00 (991)
Average snowfall inches (cm)	4.2 (11)	6.2 (16)	4.5 (11)	0.1 (0.25)	0.0 (0.0)	0.0 (0.0)	0.0 (0.0)	0.0 (0.0)	0.0 (0.0)	0.2 (0.51)	0.6 (1.5)	3.6 (9.1)	19.4 (49)
Average precipitation days (≥ 0.01 in)	10.0	8.8	11.8	12.9	13.9	12.5	12.1	12.2	10.2	9.3	9.8	10.5	134.0
Average snowy days (≥ 0.1 in)	2.8	2.6	1.7	0.1	0.0	0.0	0.0	0.0	0.0	0.1	0.3	2.0	9.6
Source 1: NOAA
Source 2: WRCC

== History ==
Dale Enterprise is at the northern edge of “The Burnt District,” an area in which in early October 1864, during the Civil War, Union General Philip Sheridan ordered all of the houses to be burned in retribution for the death of a young staff officer, Lieutenant John Rodgers Meigs. Lt. Meigs was mortally wounded by Confederate cavalry scouts a couple miles southeast of Dale Enterprise on October 3, 1864. Many families in the Dale Enterprise vicinity lost their homes, farm buildings, and livestock in the ensuing destruction, despite the fact that most of the area families were pacifist Mennonites.

== Dale Enterprise Weather Station ==
Lewis “L. J.” Heatwole, the son of David and Catherine Driver Heatwole, started keeping a weather diary at his parents’ farm in Dale Enterprise in 1868 at the age of 15. In 1884, the U.S. Signal Service designated Heatwole as a "voluntary observer." Four years later, Heatwole set up the Dale Enterprise weather station.

The Dale Enterprise station is the oldest operating weather station in Virginia and the third oldest in the nation, and has been operated by the same family since its founding. The station is located in a farm field, “well away from buildings or hard surfaces.” As of early 2010, the station’s original thermometer remained as a back-up to an electronic temperature sensor installed in 1994.

== Blosser Printing Press ==
The Blosser Printing Press was established by Abraham Blosser in the late 19th century in his home near Dale Enterprise. His main publication at the press is noted as the Watchful Pilgrim, a semimonthly paper he edited and printed for several years, starting in 1880. David Taylor was the typesetter. The press also ran a tract concerning Mennonite baptism practices – Eine Verhandlung von den äusserlichen Wasser-Taufe (Harrisonburg, Virginia, 1816) originally written in German by Peter Burkholder. In addition, Blosser printed his own tracts and did custom work.

== Dale Enterprise School ==
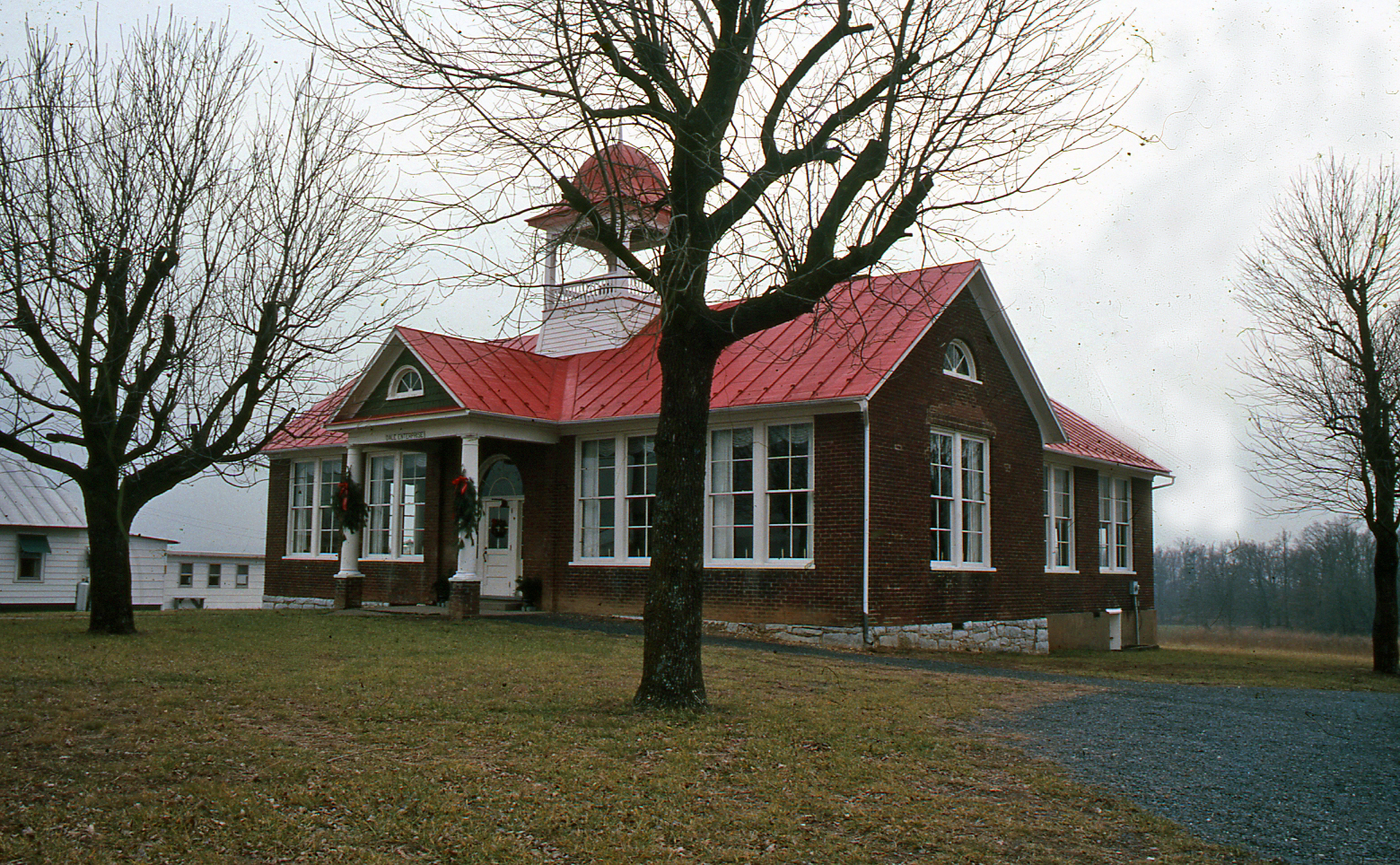
Dale Enterprise School, Dale Enterprise, VA

The history of the Dale Enterprise School dates to 1877 when Peter and Nancy Heatwole deeded about half an acre of their farm to Rockingham County for a school. The frame Piney Grove School was built on the property in 1885, in a pine grove next to the H & R Springs Turnpike, later to become U.S. Highway 33.

In the summer of 1909, the County school board razed the Piney Grove schoolhouse and built the new Dale Enterprise School on the property. A 1914 County schools history refers to the new school as "a beautiful three-room brick house," and notes that "[t]he house is supplied with water from the Harrisonburg mains, and is modern except its lack of sanitary toilets." The school included grades 1-7. Each of the three classrooms had “combined classes."

After the school closed in 1963, the building stood vacant until 1975, but since then has served several uses, including its present use as the Harrisonburg Unitarian Universalist Fellowship’s church.,
