= Lacey Spring, Virginia =

Lacey Spring
- Unincorporated community
- Location in Virginia Lacey Spring (the United States)
- Coordinates: 38°32′22″N 78°46′7″W
- Country: United States
- State: Virginia
- County: Rockingham County
- ZIP code: 22833

Lacey Spring is an unincorporated community located in Rockingham County, in the U.S. state of Virginia. It is located south of Timberville, just south of Mauzy along Route 11, parallel to Interstate 81.

Two historical markers in the area commemorate a cavalry skirmish during the U.S. Civil War. On December 21, 1864, part of the 3rd Cavalry Division under the command of Union Brevet Colonel George Armstrong Custer came under attack from Confederate Major General Thomas L. Rosser’s Laurel Brigade, forcing Custer to withdraw to the north. Rosser captured forty of Custer's men along with horses and camp equipment. Custer and Rosser were friends and members of the class of 1861 at West Point, and may have briefly been roommates. Rosser resigned from West Point in May 1861, two weeks prior to graduation, to join the Confederacy.
