= Hinton, Virginia =

Hinton
- Unincorporated community
- Location in Virginia Hinton (the United States)
- Coordinates: 38°27′57″N 78°58′21″W
- Country: United States
- State: Virginia
- County: Rockingham County

Hinton is an unincorporated community located in Rockingham County, in the U.S. state of Virginia. It is located northwest of Harrisonburg along U.S. Route 33 and Route 752 near the edge of George Washington National Forest.

== Climate ==
The climate in this area is characterized by hot, humid summers and generally mild to cool winters. According to the Köppen Climate Classification system, Hinton has a humid subtropical climate, abbreviated "Cfa" on climate maps.
