= Briery Branch, Virginia =

Briery Branch
- Unincorporated community
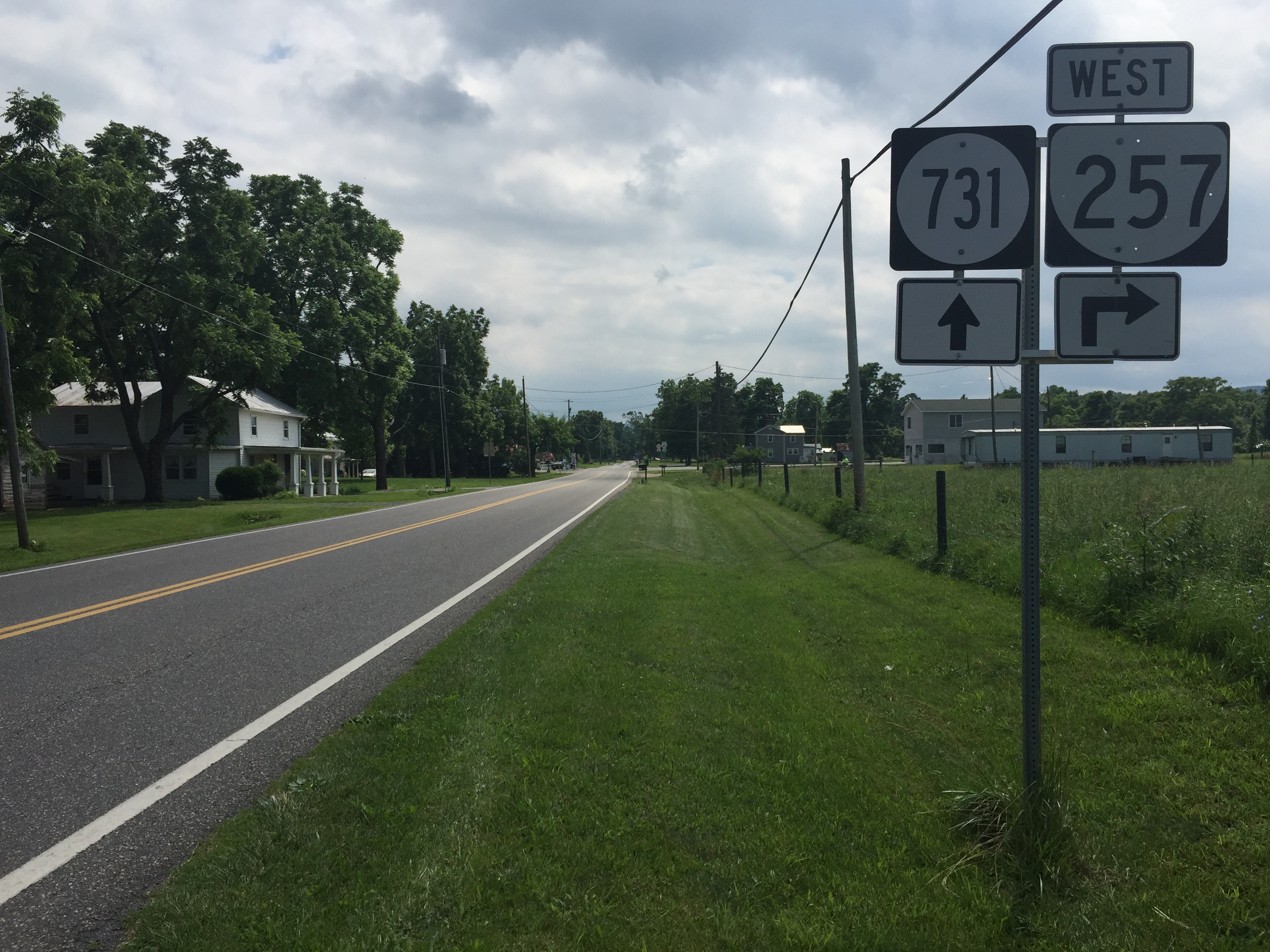

- Location in Virginia Briery Branch (the United States)
- Coordinates: 38°26′0″N 79°04′47″W
- Country: United States
- State: Virginia
- County: Rockingham County

Briery Branch is an unincorporated community located in Rockingham County, in the U.S. state of Virginia. It is located west of Ottobine and its trail leads into the George Washington National Forest.
