= Mauzy, Virginia =

Mauzy
- Unincorporated community
- Location in Virginia Mauzy (the United States)
- Coordinates: 38°34′8″N 78°45′8″W
- Country: United States
- State: Virginia
- County: Rockingham County

Mauzy [moʊˈzi] is an unincorporated community located in Rockingham County, in the U.S. state of Virginia. It is located south of Timberville, just north of Lacey Spring along Route 259, just off Interstate 81.
