= Bergton, Virginia =

Bergton
- Unincorporated community
- Location in Virginia Bergton (the United States)
- Coordinates: 38°45′52″N 78°56′21″W
- Country: United States
- State: Virginia
- County: Rockingham County
- Elevation: 1,410 ft (430 m)

Bergton, formerly Dovesville, is an unincorporated community located in Rockingham County, in the U.S. state of Virginia. It is located in George Washington National Forest, northwest of Timberville and adjacent to Criders near the state border with West Virginia. Bergton is probably best known for its annual community fair.

== History ==
Bergton was originally known as Dovesville for the large number of Dove families in the region. Following the Revolutionary War but before he became president, General George Washington spent the night of 29 September 1784 at the home of John Fitzwater, one of the magistrates of Rockingham County. The Fitzwaters lived at the intersection of Brocks Gap Road (Route 259) and Bergton Road (Route 820).

The Dovesville Post Office was established on 18 February 1876. A post office mandate to change the name to avoid confusion with the town of Covesville, led to renaming as the Bergton Post Office on 3 July 1928. In 1935, the name of the Dovesville school was changed to the Bergton school to reflect the post office name change. In 1936, the village along with Cootes Store was affected by the Great Flood. The flood washed away many barns, cottages and other features in the area. In 1987 the Bergton Elementary School was closed due to dwindling enrollment.
