= Rockingham County, Virginia =

County in Virginia, United States

- County
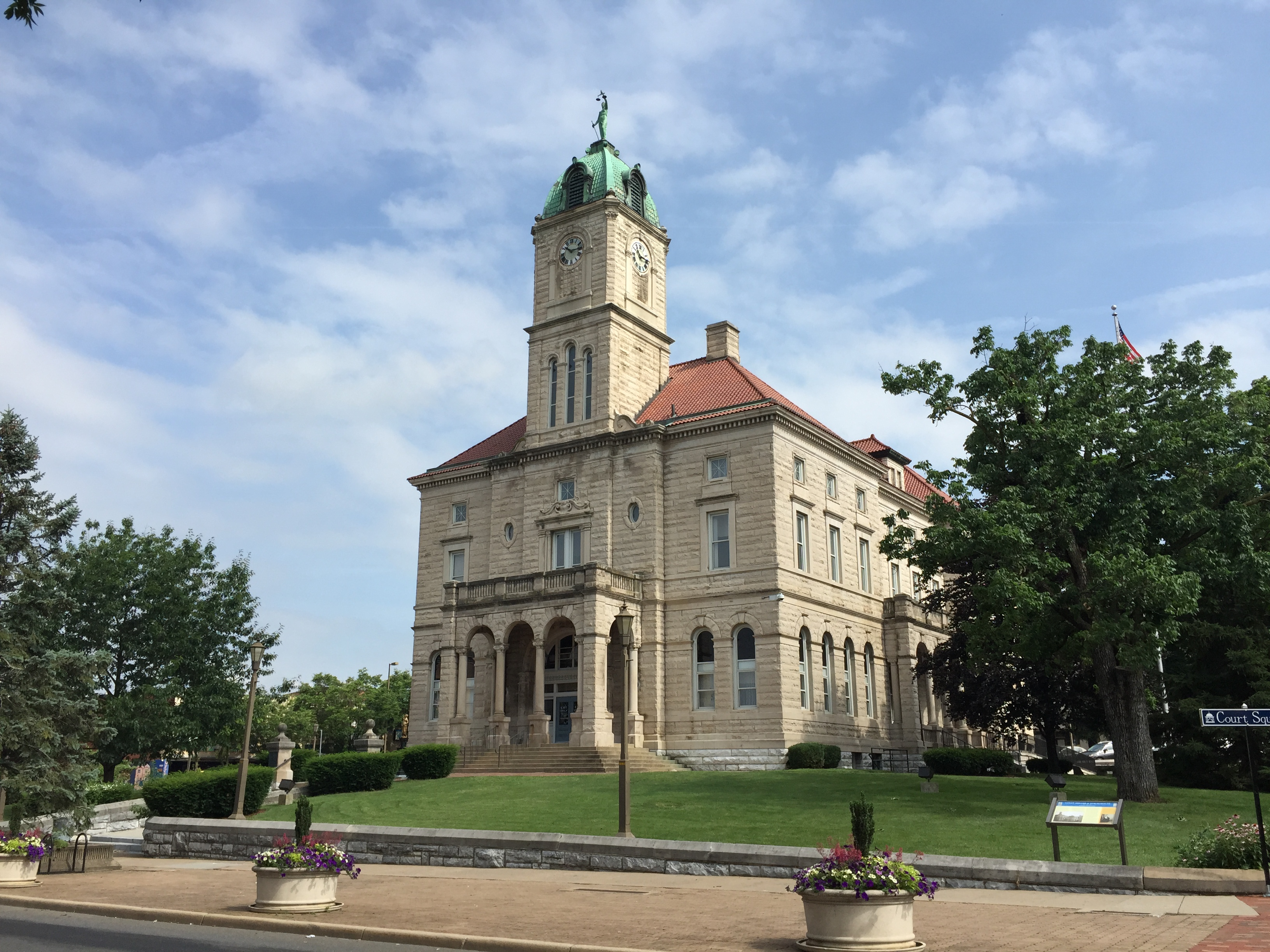
- Rockingham County Courthouse in Court Square, Harrisonburg

- Flag Seal

- Location within the U.S. state of Virginia
- Coordinates: 38°31′N 78°53′W
- Country: United States
- State: Virginia
- Founded: 1778
- Named for: Charles Watson-Wentworth
- Seat: Harrisonburg (independent city)^{1}
- Largest town: Bridgewater

Area
  - Total: 853 sq mi (2,210 km^{2})
  - Land: 849 sq mi (2,200 km^{2})
  - Water: 4.3 sq mi (11 km^{2}) 0.5%

Population (2020)
  - Total: 83,757
  - Estimate (2025): 89,316 ▲
  - Density: 98.7/sq mi (38.1/km^{2})
- Time zone: UTC−5 (Eastern)
  - Summer (DST): UTC−4 (EDT)
- Congressional district: 6th
- Website: www.rockinghamcountyva.gov

Rockingham County is located in the U.S. state of Virginia. As of the 2020 census, the population was 83,757. Its county seat is the independent city of Harrisonburg.

Along with Harrisonburg, Rockingham County forms the Harrisonburg, VA, Metropolitan Statistical Area. It is also home of the Rockingham County Baseball League.

== History ==
Settlement of the county began in 1727, when Adam Miller (Mueller) staked out a claim on the south fork of the Shenandoah River, near the line that now divides Rockingham County from Page County. On a trip through eastern Virginia, the German-born Miller had heard reports about a lush valley to the west which had been discovered by Governor Alexander Spotswood's legendary Knights of the Golden Horseshoe Expedition, and then moved his family down from Lancaster County, Pennsylvania. In 1741, Miller purchased 820 acres (3.3 km^{2}), including a large lithia spring, near Elkton, Virginia, and lived on this property for the remainder of his life.

Much-increased settlement of this portion of the Colony of Virginia by Europeans began in the 1740s and 1750s. Standing between the Tidewater and Piedmont regions to the east in Virginia and the Shenandoah Valley and the area beyond (known in old Virginia as the "Transmountaine") were the Blue Ridge Mountains. Rather than cross such a formidable physical barrier, most early settlers came southerly up the valley across the Potomac River from Maryland and Pennsylvania. Many followed the Great Wagon Trail, also known as the Valley Pike (U.S. Route 11 in modern times).

Rockingham County was established in 1778 from Augusta County. Harrisonburg was named as the county seat and incorporated as a town in 1780. Harrisonburg was incorporated as a city in 1916 and separated from Rockingham County (all cities in Virginia are independent of any county), but it remains the county seat.

The county is named for Charles Watson-Wentworth, 2nd Marquess of Rockingham, a British statesman (1730–1782). He was Prime Minister of Great Britain twice, and a keen supporter of constitutional rights for the colonists. During his first term, he brought about the repeal of the Stamp Act of 1765, reducing the tax burden on the colonies. Appointed again in 1782, upon taking office, he backed the claim for the independence of the Thirteen Colonies, initiating an end to British involvement in the American Revolutionary War. However, he died after only 14 weeks in office. By 1778, it was unusual to honor British officials in Virginia fighting for its independence. The same year, immediately to the north of Rockingham County, Dunmore County, named for Virginia's last Royal Governor, John Murray, 4th Earl of Dunmore, an unpopular figure, was renamed. The new name, Shenandoah County, used a Native American name. However, long their political supporter in the British Parliament, the Marquess of Rockingham was a popular figure with the citizens of the new United States. Also named in his honor were Rockingham County, New Hampshire, Rockingham County, North Carolina, and the City of Rockingham in Richmond County, North Carolina.

Rockingham County is the birthplace of Thomas Lincoln, Abraham Lincoln's father.

During the Civil War, Rockingham County voted for secession in the referendum of May 23, 1861. Secessionists threatened Unionist voters at the polls, and of more than 2000 votes cast, only 22 registered in opposition. The county and neighboring ones were home to hundreds of Mennonite and Church of the Brethren families, who were religiously opposed to participating in war, many of them loyal to the Union. Some hid Confederate draft resisters and deserters in their homes and barns, which participants called "depots" of an "underground railroad". They sheltered people until guides known as "pilots" could lead the over the mountains to the west, usually to New Creek, West Virginia, behind Union lines, where railroads could take them north.

Unionists in Rockingham County faced violent reprisals for their stance, including killings. Brethren elder John Kline, an who spoke out against secession, was shot and killed by a Confederate militia in June 1864. That fall, Union troops under Philip Sheridan burned animals, barns, and crops across Rockingham County, destroying the property of secessionists and Unionists.

In 1979 when the Adolf Coors Brewing Company came to Rockingham County it caused an uproar; some citizens thought it would corrupt the morals of the area while others wanted the new jobs.

In 2018, a series of strikes and protests were held in Dayton's Cargill plant.

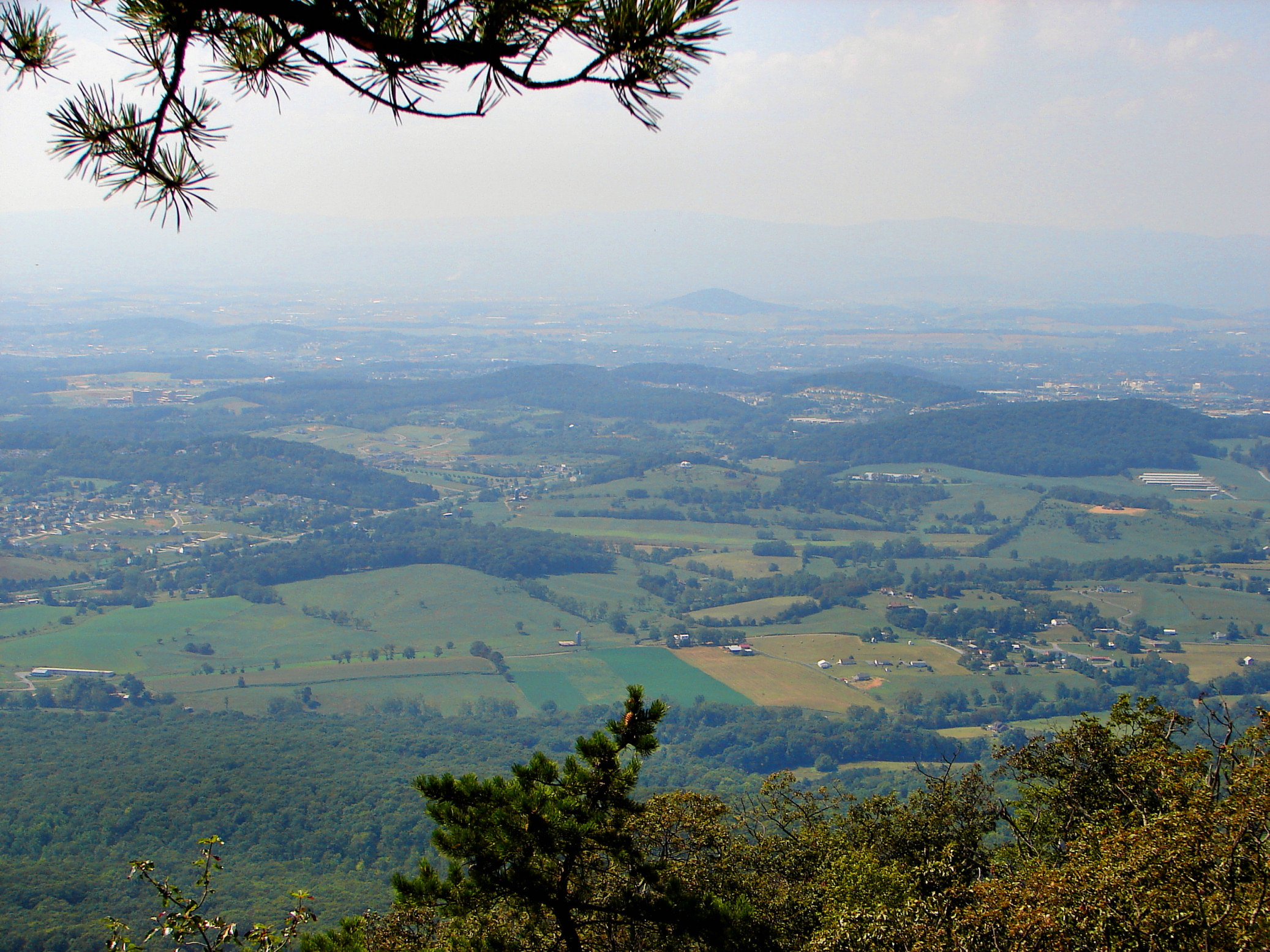
View of Rockingham County from Massanutten Mountain (looking west)

== Geography ==
According to the U.S. Census Bureau, the county has a total area of 853 square miles (2,210 km^{2}), of which 849 square miles (2,200 km^{2}) is land and 4.3 square miles (11 km^{2}) (0.5%) is water. It is the third-largest county in Virginia by land area. Large portions of the county fall within the Shenandoah National Park to the east and George Washington National Forest to the west and are therefore subject to developmental restrictions. The county stretches west to east from the peaks of easternmost Allegheny Mountains to the peaks of the Blue Ridge Mountains, encompassing the entire width of the Shenandoah Valley. Rockingham is bisected by another geographic formation, Massanutten Mountain, which stretches from just east of Harrisonburg to a few miles southwest of Front Royal in Warren County. Massanutten Mountain splits the central Shenandoah Valley, as the German River and the North Fork Shenandoah River flow on its western side, while the South Fork flows to the east.

=== Adjacent counties ===
- Pendleton County, West Virginia – west
- Hardy County, West Virginia – north
- Shenandoah County – northeast
- Page County – east
- Greene County – southeast
- Albemarle County – southeast
- Augusta County – southwest
- Harrisonburg – center (enclave)

=== National protected areas ===
- George Washington National Forest (part)
- Shenandoah National Park (part)

== Demographics ==
Historical population
Census	Pop.	Note	%±
1790	7,449		—
1800	10,374		39.3%
1810	12,753		22.9%
1820	14,784		15.9%
1830	20,683		39.9%
1840	17,344		−16.1%
1850	20,294		17.0%
1860	23,408		15.3%
1870	23,668		1.1%
1880	29,567		24.9%
1890	31,299		5.9%
1900	33,527		7.1%
1910	34,903		4.1%
1920	30,047		−13.9%
1930	29,709		−1.1%
1940	31,289		5.3%
1950	35,079		12.1%
1960	40,485		15.4%
1970	47,890		18.3%
1980	57,038		19.1%
1990	57,482		0.8%
2000	67,725		17.8%
2010	76,314		12.7%
2020	83,757		9.8%
2025 (est.)	89,316	▲	6.6%
U.S. Decennial Census; 1790–1960 1900–1990; 1990–2000 2010 2020

=== Racial and ethnic composition ===
Rockingham County, Virginia – Racial and ethnic composition Note: the US Census treats Hispanic/Latino as an ethnic category. This table excludes Latinos from the racial categories and assigns them to a separate category. Hispanics/Latinos may be of any race.
Race / Ethnicity (NH = Non-Hispanic)	Pop 1980	Pop 1990	Pop 2000	Pop 2010	Pop 2020	% 1980	% 1990	% 2000	% 2010	% 2020
White alone (NH)	55,629	55,881	63,938	69,640	71,367	97.53%	97.21%	94.41%	91.25%	85.21%
Black or African American alone (NH)	778	864	868	1,216	1,768	1.36%	1.50%	1.28%	1.59%	2.11%
Native American or Alaska Native alone (NH)	33	49	77	83	80	0.06%	0.09%	0.11%	0.11%	0.10%
Asian alone (NH)	144	135	189	454	920	0.25%	0.23%	0.28%	0.59%	1.10%
Native Hawaiian or Pacific Islander alone (NH)	x	x	5	8	9	x	x	0.01%	0.01%	0.01%
Other race alone (NH)	39	7	41	44	243	0.07%	0.01%	0.06%	0.06%	0.29%
Mixed race or Multiracial (NH)	x	x	386	793	2,277	x	x	0.57%	1.04%	2.72%
Hispanic or Latino (any race)	415	546	2,221	4,076	7,093	0.73%	0.95%	3.28%	5.34%	8.47%
Total	57,038	57,482	67,725	76,314	83,757	100.00%	100.00%	100.00%	100.00%	100.00%

=== 2020 census ===
As of the 2020 census, the county had a population of 83,757. The median age was 41.0 years. 22.0% of residents were under the age of 18 and 19.9% of residents were 65 years of age or older. For every 100 females there were 95.6 males, and for every 100 females age 18 and over there were 93.2 males age 18 and over.

The racial makeup of the county was 86.7% White, 2.3% Black or African American, 0.3% American Indian and Alaska Native, 1.1% Asian, 0.0% Native Hawaiian and Pacific Islander, 4.0% from some other race, and 5.5% from two or more races. Hispanic or Latino residents of any race comprised 8.5% of the population.

40.7% of residents lived in urban areas, while 59.3% lived in rural areas.

There were 32,013 households in the county, of which 29.4% had children under the age of 18 living with them and 23.0% had a female householder with no spouse or partner present. About 24.5% of all households were made up of individuals and 12.1% had someone living alone who was 65 years of age or older.

There were 35,436 housing units, of which 9.7% were vacant. Among occupied housing units, 73.3% were owner-occupied and 26.7% were renter-occupied. The homeowner vacancy rate was 1.0% and the rental vacancy rate was 5.0%.

=== Census 2000 ===
As of the census of 2000, 67,725 people, 25,355 households, and 18,889 families resided in the county. The population density was 80 people per square mile (31 people/km^{2}). There were 27,328 housing units at an average density of 32 units per square mile (12 units/km^{2}). The racial makeup of the county was 96.58% White, 1.36% Black or African American, 0.13% Native American, 0.29% Asian, 0.01% Pacific Islander, 0.90% from other races, and 0.73% from two or more races. About 3.28% of the population were Hispanic or Latino of any race.

Of 25,355 households, 32.90% had children under the age of 18 living with them, 62.40% were married couples living together, 7.90% had a female householder with no husband present, and 25.50% were not families. About 21.20% of all households were made up of individuals, and 9.10% had someone living alone who was 65 years of age or older. The average household size was 2.61 and the average family size was 3.02.

In the county, the population was distributed as 24.60% under the age of 18, 8.70% from 18 to 24, 28.90% from 25 to 44, 23.80% from 45 to 64, and 13.90% who were 65 years of age or older. The median age was 38 years. For every 100 females, there were 97.00 males. For every 100 females aged 18 and over, there were 94.30 males.

The median income for a household in the county was $40,748, and for a family was $46,262. Males had a median income of $30,618 versus $21,896 for females. The per capita income for the county was $18,795. About 5.30% of families and 8.20% of the population were below the poverty line, including 9.10% of those under age 18 and 9.70% of those age 65 or over.

== Education ==
=== Colleges and universities ===
- Bridgewater College, Bridgewater, Virginia
- Eastern Mennonite University, Harrisonburg, Virginia
- James Madison University, Harrisonburg, Virginia

== Transportation ==
=== Railroads ===
Rockingham County is principally served by Norfolk Southern Railway, a (major) Class 1 railroad and additionally, by the Shenandoah Valley Railroad, a short-line railroad.

=== Highways ===
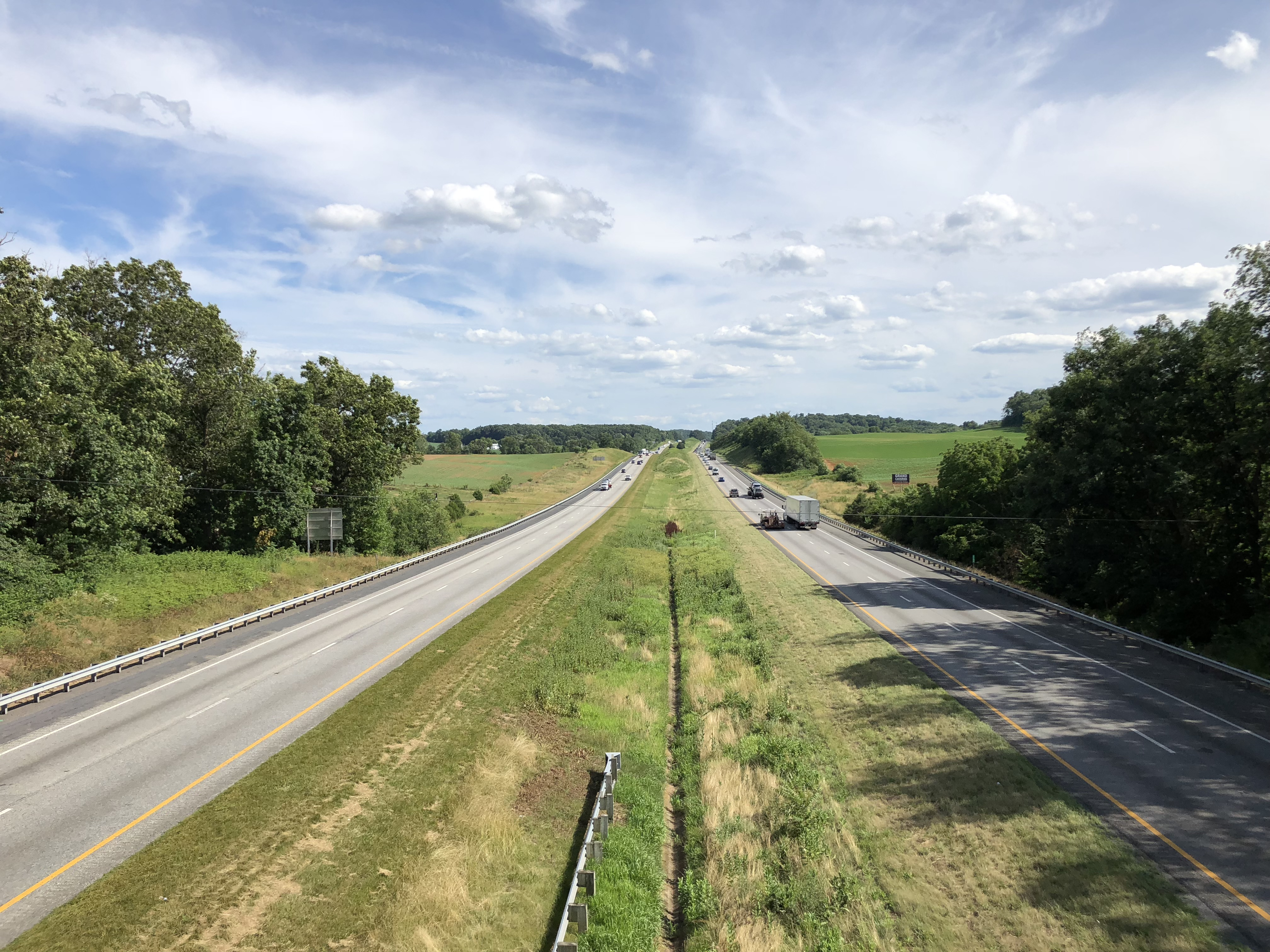
I-81 in Rockingham County

Interstate 81 runs north–south and meets east–west Interstate 64 near Staunton to the south in adjacent Augusta County.

There are three major Primary State Highways in the county. (A primary road provides service which is relatively continuous and of relatively high traffic volume, long average trip length, high operating speed and high mobility importance). Interstate highways and primary highways in Virginia are maintained by the Virginia Department of Transportation (VDOT).

These primary state highways are:

- U.S. Route 11 a north–south roadway which Interstate 81 parallels, U.S. Route 11 follows an old Native American trail, later known as the Valley Turnpike.
- U.S. Route 33 is an east–west road which extends from a mountain ridge border with West Virginia across the Shenandoah Valley through Harrisonburg and Elkton. East of there, it climbs the western slope of the Blue Ridge Mountains to reach Swift Run Gap, a wind gap located at an elevation of 2,365 feet (721 m). The bucolic Skyline Drive, which is part of Shenandoah National Park, has an entry point at Swift Run Gap and the Appalachian Trail also passes through nearby. The mountain ridge forms the border between Rockingham County and Greene County. (U.S. 33 continues east to Richmond).
- U.S. Route 340 in a north–south roadway which runs along the western slope of the Blue Ridge Mountains in the Valley.

Secondary roads: As provided by the Byrd Road Act of 1932, secondary roads in Rockingham County are also maintained by the Virginia Department of Transportation (VDOT).

== Communities ==

(Population according to the 2020 United States census)

Towns: 1. Bridgewater (6,596); 2. Broadway (4,170); 3. Dayton (1,688); 4. Elkton (2,941); 5. Grottoes (2,899); 6. Mount Crawford (439); 7. Timberville (2,963)		Census-designated places (CDP): 1. Belmont Estates (1,263); 2. Keezletown (369), new in 2020; 3. Linville (355), new in 2020; 4. Massanetta Springs (6,384); 5. Massanutten (2,164); 6. McGaheysville (978), new in 2020; 7. Port Republic (408), new in 2020; 8. Singers Glen (195), new in 2020
Unincorporated Communities
Bergton; Berrytown; Briery Branch; Clover Hill; Cootes Store; Criders; Cross Keys	Dale Enterprise; Edom; Fulks Run; Hinton; Inglewood; Lacey Spring; Lilly	Mauzy; Mayland; Montezuma; Mount Clinton; New Erection; Penn Laird; Pleasant Valley	Rawley Springs; Sparkling Springs; Spring Creek; Stemphleytown; Tenth Legion; Genoa; Turleytown; Yankeetown

=== Independent city ===
Since becoming an independent city in 1916, Harrisonburg is no longer politically located in Rockingham County, despite its status as the county seat.

== Law enforcement ==
Rockingham County Sheriff's Office
- Abbreviation: RCSO

Agency overview
- Employees: 170+

Jurisdictional structure
- Constituting instrument: Yes
- General nature: Local civilian police

Operational structure
- Headquarters: Harrisonburg, Virginia
- Deputys: 170
- Agency executive: Bryan F. Hutcheson, Sheriff

Facilities
- Sheriff's Offices: 1
- Regional Jails: 1

Website
- Official Website

The Rockingham County Sheriff's Office (RCSO) is the primary law enforcement agency in Rockingham County, and also serves Harrisonburg. The agency is currently headed by Sheriff Bryan F. Hutcheson. On May 26, 2005, the RCSO was accredited by the Virginia Law Enforcement Professional Standards Commission (VLEPSC). On September 9, 2021, the VLEPSC Executive Board granted re-accreditation status to the Rockingham County Sheriff's Office.

Since the establishment of the Rockingham County Sheriff's Office, two deputies have died while on duty.

== Politics ==
Rockingham is a strongly Republican county, like most of the Shenandoah Valley. Since 1944, Lyndon Johnson in 1964 – substantially due to the support of pietistic Protestant sects in the county for civil rights – is the only Democratic presidential nominee to win even 37 percent of the county's vote, whilst the last Democratic gubernatorial candidate it backed was J. Lindsay Almond as far back as 1957.

United States presidential election results for Rockingham County, Virginia
Year	Republican		Democratic		Third party(ies)	
Year	No.	%	No.	%	No.	%
1912	937	29.36%	1,761	55.19%	493	15.45%
1916	1,322	43.89%	1,650	54.78%	40	1.33%
1920	2,464	53.71%	2,068	45.07%	56	1.22%
1924	1,982	47.97%	2,040	49.37%	110	2.66%
1928	3,822	73.16%	1,402	26.84%	0	0.00%
1932	2,194	42.96%	2,750	53.85%	163	3.19%
1936	2,834	48.91%	2,916	50.33%	44	0.76%
1940	2,922	52.71%	2,569	46.34%	53	0.96%
1944	3,714	63.61%	2,104	36.03%	21	0.36%
1948	3,219	62.12%	1,680	32.42%	283	5.46%
1952	4,350	73.11%	1,591	26.74%	9	0.15%
1956	4,324	71.74%	1,605	26.63%	98	1.63%
1960	4,829	70.27%	2,026	29.48%	17	0.25%
1964	4,155	49.68%	4,205	50.28%	3	0.04%
1968	7,779	66.40%	2,111	18.02%	1,825	15.58%
1972	10,025	81.67%	2,026	16.51%	224	1.82%
1976	9,768	61.87%	5,349	33.88%	672	4.26%
1980	11,397	63.82%	5,294	29.64%	1,168	6.54%
1984	13,480	75.70%	4,220	23.70%	107	0.60%
1988	13,241	72.59%	4,716	25.85%	284	1.56%
1992	13,016	60.56%	5,407	25.16%	3,070	14.28%
1996	14,035	64.66%	5,867	27.03%	1,805	8.32%
2000	17,482	72.86%	5,834	24.31%	678	2.83%
2004	21,737	74.40%	7,273	24.89%	206	0.71%
2008	22,468	67.40%	10,453	31.36%	413	1.24%
2012	24,186	69.37%	10,065	28.87%	615	1.76%
2016	25,990	69.33%	9,366	24.98%	2,131	5.68%
2020	30,349	69.27%	12,644	28.86%	818	1.87%
2024	32,045	69.36%	13,418	29.04%	737	1.60%

== See also ==
- National Register of Historic Places listings in Rockingham County, Virginia
- Rockingham County Fair
- Rockingham County Sheriff's Office
