= Clover Hill, Rockingham County, Virginia =

Clover Hill
- Unincorporated community
- Location within the state of Virginia Clover Hill (the United States)
- Coordinates: 38°27′7.4″N 79°1′48.1″W
- Country: United States
- State: Virginia
- County: Rockingham
- Time zone: UTC−5 (Eastern (EST))
  - Summer (DST): UTC−4 (EDT)

Clover Hill is an unincorporated community in Rockingham County, Virginia, United States.
