= Shenandoah Germans =

Ethnic group of European-American settlers in Virginia and West Virginia

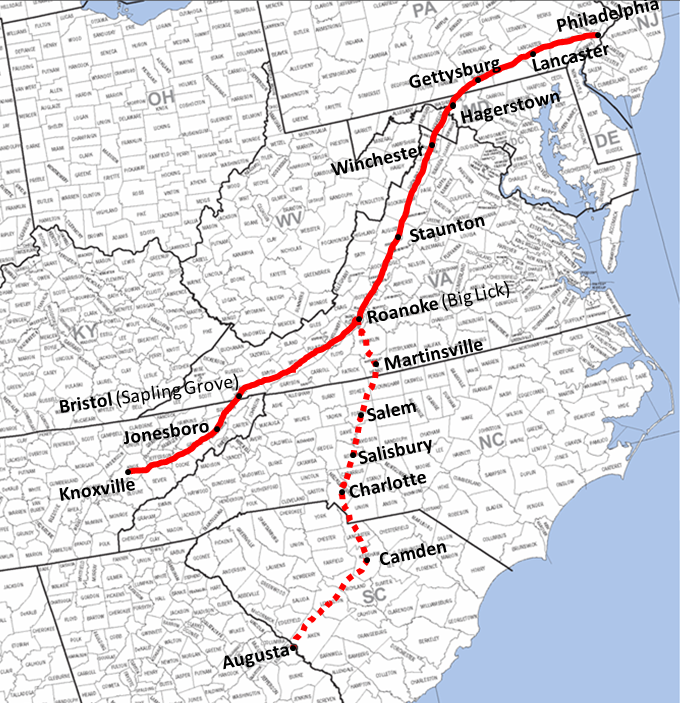
The Great Valley Road used by settlers in the 1700s America. See Google map of this area.

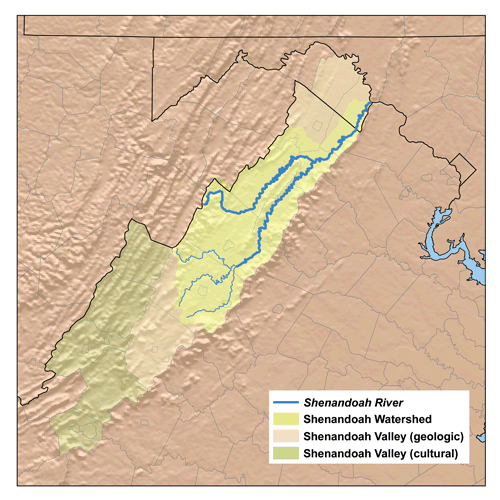
Map of the Shenandoah Valley

Though Scots-Irish Americans, Scottish Americans, English with other various British American settlers and their descendants compose the majority of the population of the Shenandoah Valley region of Virginia and parts of West Virginia, the regions home to a long-established German-American community dating to the 17th century. The earliest German settlers to Shenandoah, sometimes known as the Shenandoah Deitsch or the Valley Dutch, were Pennsylvania Dutch migrants who traveled from southeastern Pennsylvania. These German settlers traveled southward along what became known as the Great Wagon Road. They were descendants of German, Swiss, and Alsatian Protestants who began settling in Pennsylvania during the late 1600s. Among them were German Palatines who had fled the Rhineland-Palatinate region of southwestern Germany due to religious and political persecution during repeated invasions by French troops.

While Americans with British Isles heritage mostly dominate the region, were and remain its backbone culturally and historically, there still were German settlers in the valley who belonged to Anabaptist denominations, such as the Mennonites, the Dunkers (now known as the Brethren), and others. Smaller and later numbers of settlers were German Catholics or German Jews. Such German Americans were the earliest European settlers of the Shenandoah Valley, mostly in the northern portions. Scotch-Irish, many of whom also migrated from Pennsylvania, mostly settled in the southern portions of the valley. It was considered the backcountry in contrast to established communities of the Tidewater and Piedmont.

Because of their close community, many ethnic Germans continued to speak the German language here until World War I. Anti-German sentiment at the time resulted in many German Americans abandoning their language in public and making more effort to assimilate into the cultural mainstream.

The German contribution to the culture of the Shenandoah Valley has been mild, mostly having significantly declined over the years. They popularized Pennsylvania Dutch cuisine and adopted shape note singing from English-Scots Irish Baptist and Methodist preachers during the Great Awakening, in which many of them converted. Because the majority of white Southerners were often of English and Scotch-Irish ancestry, these German Americans gave the area some ethnic diversity, "a characteristic more Pennsylvanian then Virginian". While the valley is geographically, plus culturally, within the Southern, the German contribution from the Mid-Atlantic has "made it appear Northern".

In the 21st century, the Shenandoah Valley and Harrisonburg in particular have become known as a haven for refugees, primarily from Mexico and the Americas. Mennonites and the Church of the Brethren have helped migrants from Latin America and elsewhere. These two denominations share an emphasis on pacifism and social justice. They try to honor their own history of having been refugees from religious persecution in Europe. Current immigration of Latinos from the Caribbean, Central and South America is diversifying the valley's culture.

== History ==
In 1727, Adam Miller became the first white settler in the Shenandoah Valley. Miller was a Mennonite born in Schriesheim, Germany, who immigrated to Lancaster County, Pennsylvania in 1724 and reached the Shenandoah Valley three years later.

Mass German migration to the Shenandoah Valley and Northern Virginia began soon after 1725. While most Germans came from Pennsylvania (as well as New Jersey and New York), some migrated directly from Europe. This was the case with the colonies of Germanna and Germantown, as well as several Swiss groups.

=== Slavery ===
Due to both economic reasons in the backcountry and Anabaptist objections to slavery, the German settlers in the Central Shenandoah Valley owned fewer slaves than average for white Virginians and white Southerners. The area historically had a smaller African-American population than many other regions of the South. During the 1840s, 11% of Rockingham County's population were enslaved people. By comparison, 57% of the four adjacent counties to the east of the Blue Ridge Mountains were enslaved African Americans. However, all white residents of the Shenandoah Valley were still economically connected to the institution in the state's slave society.

White-owned farms in the Shenandoah Valley typically owned none, one, or a few enslaved people. Some large plantations, whose owners held many enslaved people, also existed in the Shenandoah Valley. According to the National Park Service, the culture of the Shenandoah Valley was "part of a system of race-based slavery" and white residents of the Valley "used racism, violence, and fear to maintain it".

Major Isaac Hite Jr., the grandson of German pioneer Jost Hite, became the owner of 15 enslaved people when he married Nelly Madison in 1783. Nelly's father James Madison Sr. gave the couple the slaves as a wedding present. Isaac and Nelly lived on the Belle Grove Plantation, where they held 103 slaves by the 1810 census. Enslaved labor at Belle Grove Plantation was used for farming, as well as for a blacksmith shop, gristmill, sawmill, distillery, lime kiln, and quarry.

According to historian Nancy Sorrells, the "lower number of slaves in the Shenandoah Valley before the Civil War has fostered the idea that slavery there was different or more benevolent", a claim she regards as false. According to Sorrells, one in five residents of Augusta County was a slave in 1861. Sorrells presented a program called "Slavery and its Aftermath in the Upper Valley" (2015) at the Augusta County Historical Society. She explained that "while there were some differences, slavery in the Valley was no less horrific or entwined in the culture than in any other slave society".

== Demographics ==
By 1790, 28% of white residents living between Strasburg and Harrisonburg were German Americans. This number dramatically lowered over the years. Jost Hite, a German leader, had been granted 100,000 acres by Virginia officials working to develop the region. He resold smaller family plots of between 100 and 500 acres to local German settlers.

In 2008, the Valley Brethren-Mennonite Heritage Center estimated that the Central Shenandoah Valley was home to 16,000 Mennonites and Brethren, approximately 10% of the population. Around 800 were Old Order Mennonites, a group that is similar to Old Order Amish. They are distinguished by their highly distinctive traditional lifestyle and forms of dress.

== Culture ==
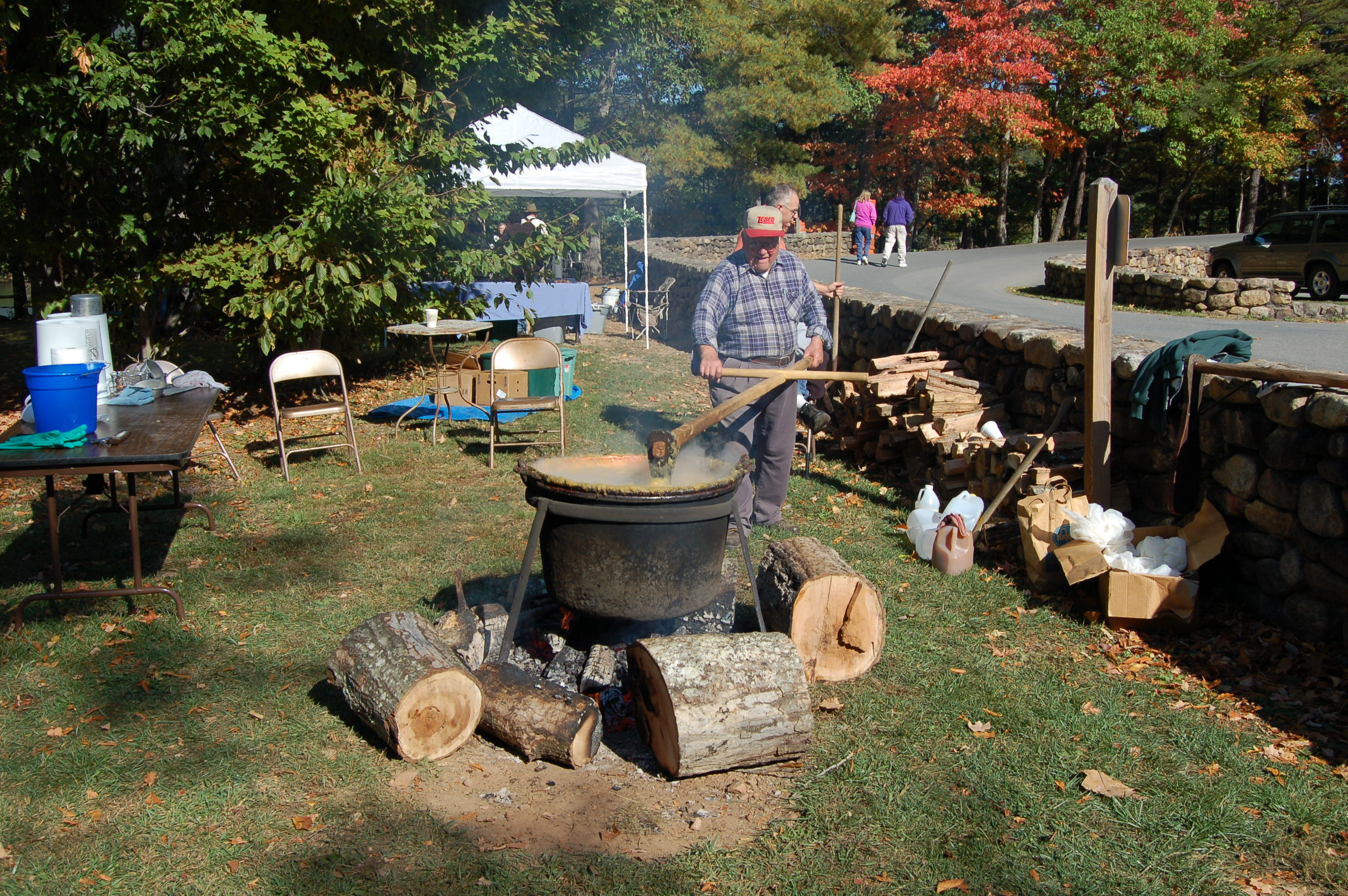
A Virginian man making apple butter, May 2005.

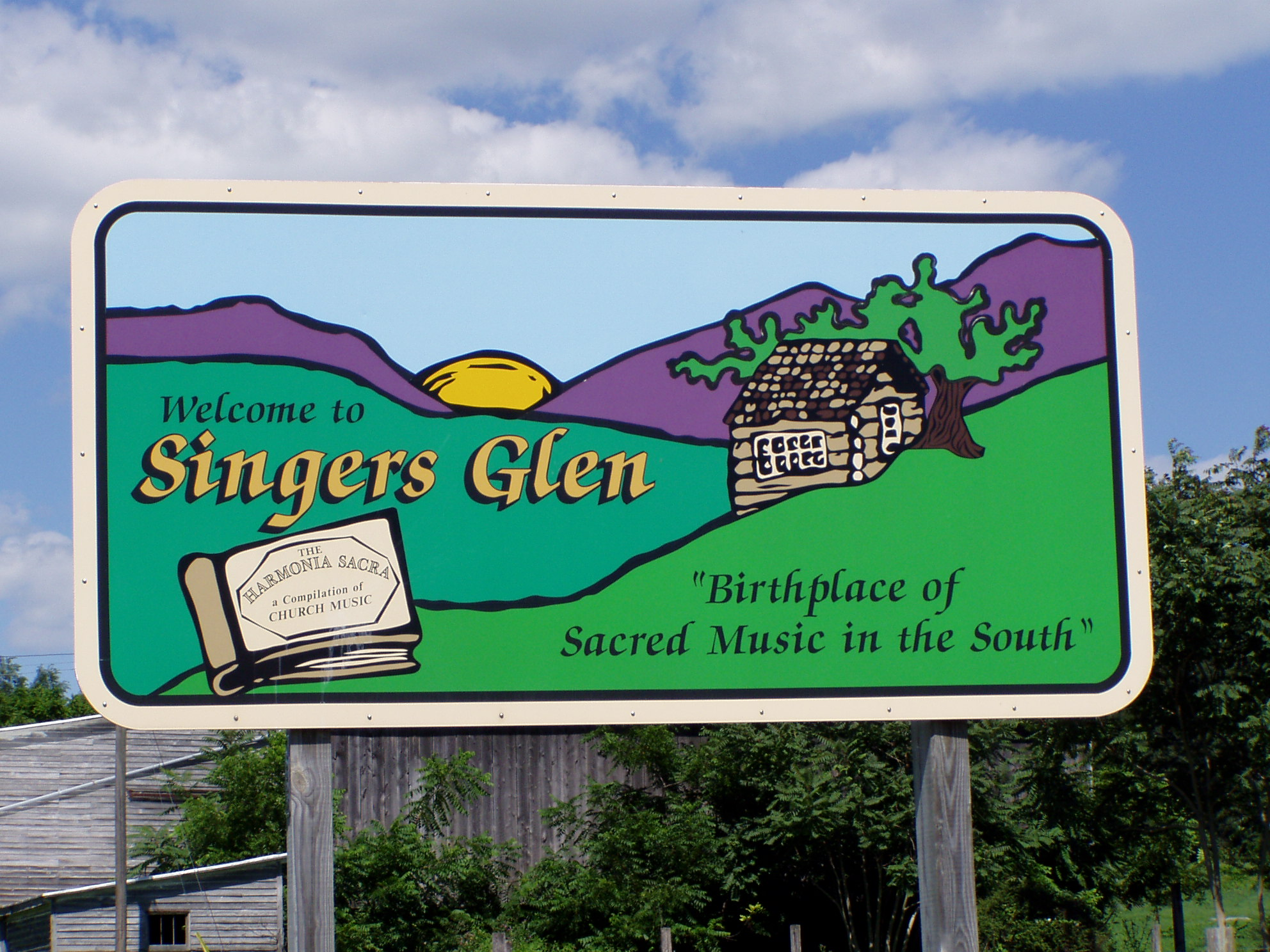
Singers Glen welcome sign; "Birthplace of Sacred Music in the South", August 2002.

=== Cuisine ===
The Pennsylvania German settlers of Shenandoah brought with them many staples of Pennsylvania Dutch cuisine, such as sauerkraut, apple butter, cabbage served with hot sauce, souse, ponhoss (scrapple), buckwheat pancakes, knödel, rivvels and ham bone pot pie. The staple grains were wheat, spelt, and barley. In lieu of bear garlic used in Germany, they substituted ramps.

=== Music ===
In 1809, Joseph Funk (a Mennonite of Bernese Swiss descent) and other descendants of the German Anabaptists, settled in what is now known as Singers Glen. Funk was a well-known music teacher and composer. Thanks to his work, Singers Glen sometimes claims to be the birthplace of gospel music in the American South.

The Joseph Funk House and Singers Glen Historic District are listed on the National Register of Historic Places.

== Religion ==
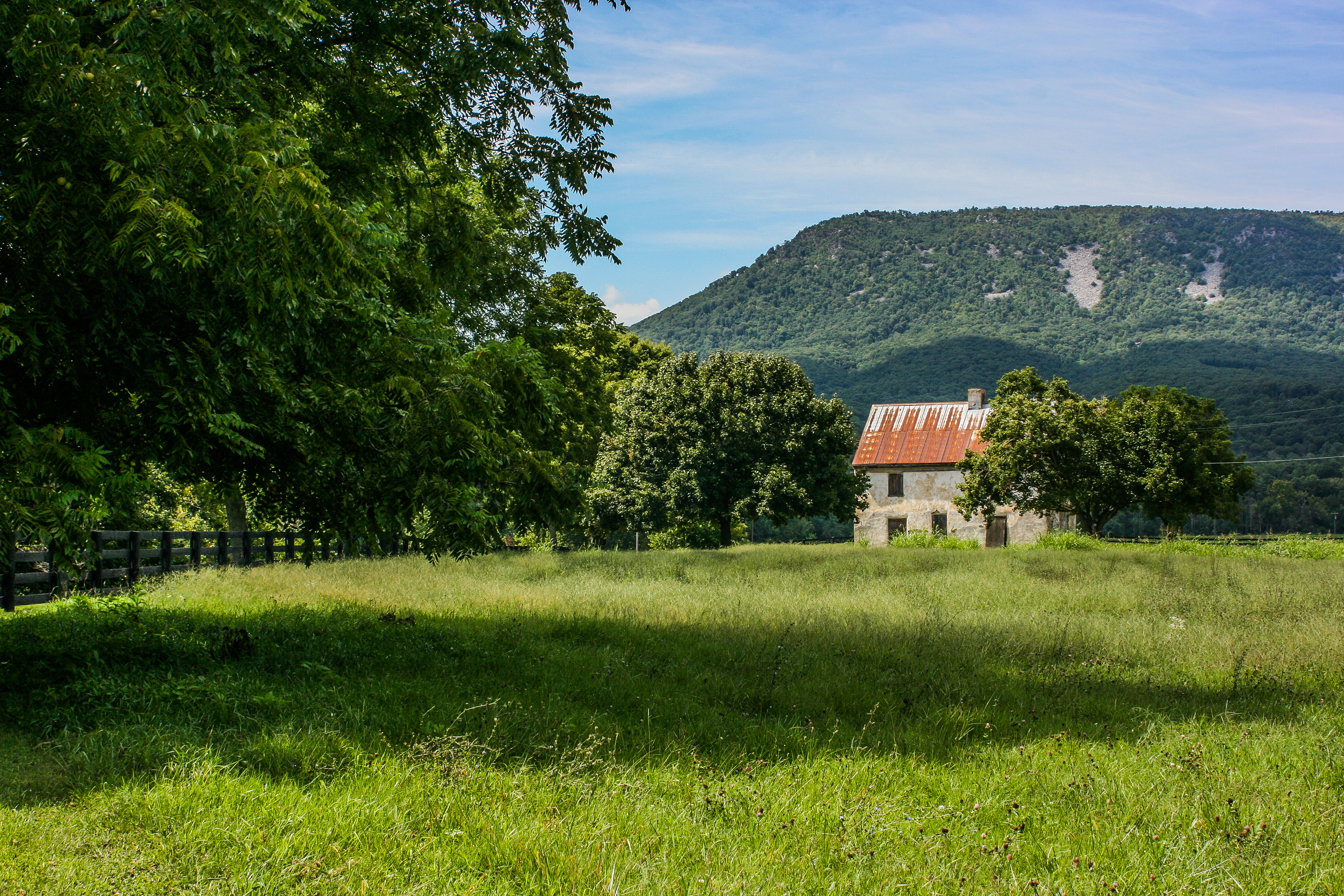
This house was built in 1760 by Martin Kauffman Jr. in the Page Valley, near present-day Luray. It was built as a residence and Mennonite church for early settlers in the Massanutten settlement. Martin's father, Martin Kauffman Sr, moved to the valley from Lancaster County, PA in 1732.

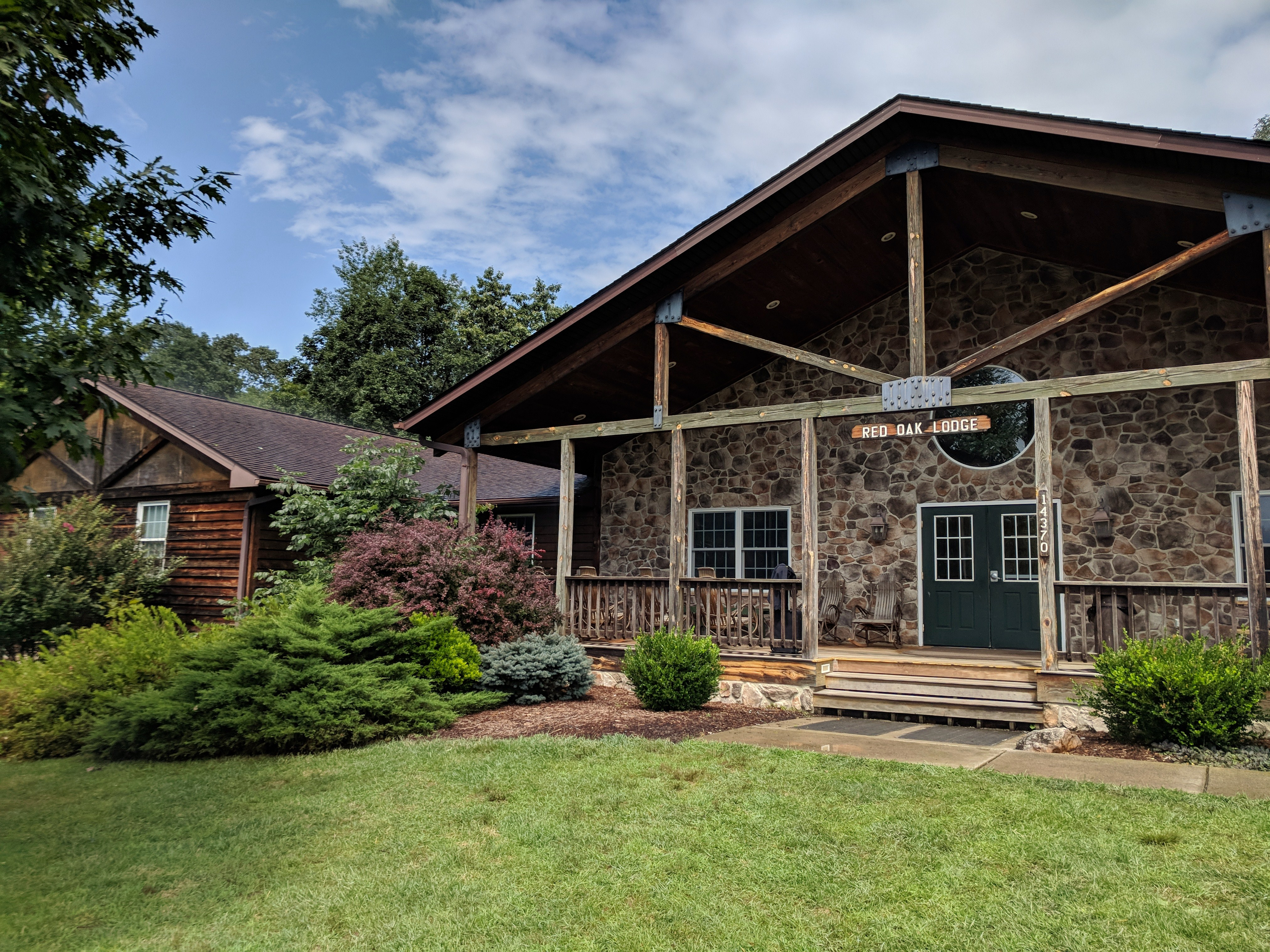
Red Oak Lodge at Highland Retreat, a Mennonite camp in Bergton, August 2018.

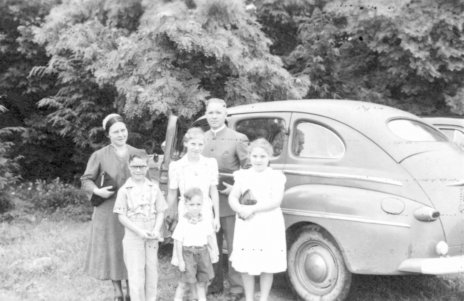
Mennonites from the Valley View Church in Bergton, 1947.

=== Christianity ===
The German-American population of the Shenandoah Valley is overwhelmingly Christian and predominantly Protestant. While the Mennonites and the Brethren have been the most prominent German Protestant denominations, smaller German denominations have existed, such as Lutherans and the Reformed. A minority of German Christians in Shenandoah have been non-Protestant, most notably German Catholics.

==== Amish ====
The Amish population in the Shenandoah Valley has been small, and a community exists in Stuarts Draft. The Beachy Amish Mennonite community here attracted press attention due to a high-profile 2012 kidnapping case. Kenneth L. Miller, a Beachy Amish minister, was accused of aiding a woman to violate custody orders by fleeing to Nicaragua, where the woman and her daughter were hosted by Amish missionaries. The woman, Lisa A. Miller (no relation to the minister), had renounced her lesbianism and had been blocking her ex-partner of many years from any contact with their daughter. Kenneth Miller was found guilty and sentenced to 27 months in prison for abetting an international parental kidnapping.

==== Mennonite ====
The first Mennonite settlers arrived in the Shenandoah Valley in 1728. These settlers established three main areas. The first settlement was Massanutten, a Mennonite colony near Luray, in what is today Page County. During the Seven Years' War, these settlements were nearly destroyed by Native Americans allied with combatants and seeking to expel settlers from the valley. Many Mennonites returned to Pennsylvania.

After the danger subsided, Mennonites began to resettle in Augusta and Rockingham counties. The second area of settlement was the Opequon colony in Frederick County. The third settlement, known as the Shenandoah colony, extended south from Strasburg along the western slope of Massanutten Mountain. Over time, these three colonies expanded in size and number until they grew together to become one large ethnic German tract. By the time of the American Revolution, the Mennonite community had become established in the Shenandoah Valley.

The Mennonites shared religion and German and Swiss ethnic origins. For many years, they also continued to speak German, and it continued to be used for liturgy into the 19th century. John Weaver (1818–1877), John Geil (1799–1890), and ny many other Mennonite ministers exclusively used German during services. The last Mennonite minister to preach in German was Daniel Showalter (1802–1889) of Rockingham County. Visiting Pennsylvania Dutch ministers would occasionally give German-language sermons to older Mennonite congregation members. The last people to retain the Pennsylvania Dutch dialect were the Old Order Mennonite community in Rockingham County. While these people use only English today, some older Mennonites still spoke German at home until the 1940s and 1950s.

Historically most Mennonites were white people of Germanic ancestry. The community has become more diverse since the late 20th century. Due to Mennonite activities to resettle refugees, many Hispanic and Latino people here from Mexico and Central America have joined the Mennonites.

==== Brethren ====
The Dunker movement originated in Germany in the early 1700s. They were commonly known as the German Baptist Brethren. By 1908, they had officially changed their name to the Church of the Brethren. The Brethren first settled in southeastern Pennsylvania in the early 1700s, before moving to both Western Maryland and the Shenandoah Valley. Pacifists, the Brethren refused to serve for either the north or the south during the Civil War. They supported abolitionism, temperance, and teetotalism. In accordance with their belief in simplicity, a cappella hymns were sung with no musical accompaniment and churches were built without stained glass windows, crosses, or steeples. In Brethren congregations, men and women were segregated to separate sections of the church.

Beginning in the 1950s, the Bridgewater Church of the Brethren took a leading role in the modern settlement of refugees in the Shenandoah Valley. The first modern refugees were a Dutch Indonesian family the Brethren helped resettle in 1957.

=== Judaism ===
The small number of German Jews who have settled in the Shenandoah Valley have constructed two houses of worship: the Temple House of Israel, a Reform synagogue in Staunton; and the Beth El Congregation, a Reform synagogue in Harrisonburg. Many were German-speaking Jews from Bohemia. These Jews from Germany and Bohemia maintained a strong German identity and were highly active in German-American fraternal organizations, particularly in Harrisonburg. A number of Jews from Pennsylvania Dutch areas migrated to the Shenandoah Valley.

== Integration ==
The Germans experienced some discrimination, but the community developed when the frontier was relatively open. During the 18th century and the early 19th century, the Germans were largely accepted by English and Scotch-Irish who also lived in the valley. The backcountry was relatively free of some of the class competition of the coastal areas, as most of the new settlers were subsistence farmers.

By the mid-18th century, Winchester had a mixed population of Germans, English, Irish, and Scotch-Irish. Riots broke out between Germans and Scotch-Irish in 1759 wherein the Germans were "much beaten and hurt".

An early 20th century history about German Americans attested that many Germans were anti-Irish because of their hostility to Roman Catholicism. According to this source, Germans often exhibited an effigy of Saint Patrick on Saint Patrick's Day with a string of potatoes around his neck, and an effigy of his wife Sheeley with an apron loaded with potatoes. Enraged Irish Catholics would display an effigy of Saint Michael on Saint Michael's Day with a rope of sauerkraut around his neck. During these spats between the Germans and the Irish, "many a black eye, bloody nose, and broken head was a result".

== Historic places ==
- Abraham Beydler House
- Fort Bowman
- Frontier Culture Museum of Virginia
- Glebe Burying Ground
- Heiston–Strickler House
- Hupp House
- John K. Beery Farm
- Joseph Funk House
- Mannheim (Linville, Virginia)
- Peter Paul House
- Singers Glen Historic District
- Tunker House
- Zirkle Mill

== See also ==
- Anabaptist settler colonialism
- German Americans
- German Palatines
- Germany Valley
- Great Wagon Road
- Palatinate (region)
- Pennsylvania Dutch language
- Pennsylvania Germans
- Protestantism in Germany
- Protestantism in Switzerland
- Tuckahoes and Cohees
- Valley Pike
- Weaver family (North Carolina)
