= Ephraim Ruebush =

American music teacher and publisher

Ephraim Ruebush (September 26, 1833 – November 18, 1924) was a music teacher, publisher, and co-founder of the Ruebush-Kieffer Company, one of the largest and most influential publishers of gospel song books in the United States.

Ephraim Ruebush was born in Churchville, Virginia, the son of John Ruebush and Mary Huffman. In September 1853, he traveled to Singers Glen, Virginia, to study music and printing under Joseph Funk. He married Lucille Virginia Kieffer on March 28, 1861. With his brother-in-law, Aldine Silliman Kieffer, he founded the Kieffer-Ruebush music company in Dayton, Virginia. This became one of the largest and most influential gospel music companies of its day, printing songbooks into the 1940s. Ruebush died on November 18, 1924, and is buried in Dayton.

Jacob Henry Hall, an author of books on gospel music and a book on gospel songwriters, was associated with the company.
