= Aldine Silliman Kieffer =

American music publisher

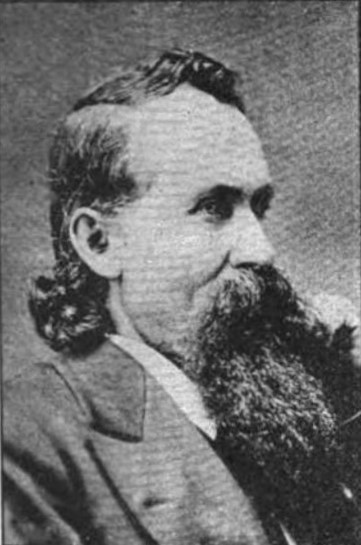
Portrait of Aldine Sillman Kieffer

Aldine Silliman Kieffer (August 1, 1840 – November 30, 1904) was a leading 19th century proponent of shape note musical notation, music teacher and publisher.

Kieffer was born near Miami, Saline County, Missouri. He died in Dayton, Virginia, and is buried there.

Kieffer was the grandson of Mennonite musician Joseph Funk. After Funk's death, he and Ephraim Ruebush took over Funk's publishing company. With Ruebush and John W. Howe, Kieffer founded the Kieffer, Ruebush, & Company music company circa 1873, which was moved from Singers Glen to Dayton, Virginia, in 1878. Kieffer was editor of the Musical Million and Fireside Friend periodical. The Musical Million, published from 1870 until 1914, was one of the leading tools promoting shape note music for almost a half century. It helped link teachers and students across the country, and published many songs in its pages.

Kieffer taught singing schools and used his songbooks in the schools. One of Kieffer's most popular song books was The Temple Star, published at Singer's Glen in 1877. One of his most popular songs was his poem Twilight is Stealing, set to music by B. C. Unseld in 1877 and published in the Temple Star.

== Selected bibliography ==
- The Starry Crown; for the Sabbath school, edited by Aldine S. Kieffer; Singer's Glen, Virginia: Ruebush, Kieffer, & Co., 1874.
- The Temple Star: For Singing-Schools, Conventions, Choirs, Day-Schools and Musical Societies, edited by Aldine S. Kieffer; Singer's Glen, Virginia: Ruebush, Kieffer & Co., 1877.
- The Shining Light; a varied collection of sacred songs for Sabbath-schools, social meetings, and the home circle, by J. H. Tenney and A. S. Kieffer; Dayton, Virginia: Ruebush Kieffer & Co., 1879.
- Sharon's Dewy Rose; a collection of new music and hymns for the use of Sabbath-schools, prayer meetings, and special occasions, by A. S. Kieffer and J. H. Tenney; Dayton, Virginia: Ruebush, Kieffer & Co., 1880.
- Sweet Fields of Eden; for the Sabbath school, by J. H. Tenney, A. S. Kieffer, and Wm. B. Blake; Dayton, Virginia: Ruebush, Kieffer,& Co., 1882.
- The Zion Songster No. 1; for Sabbath Schools, edited by Aldine S. Kieffer; Dayton, Virginia: Ruebush, Kieffer & Co., 1885.
- The Royal Proclamation, edited by Aldine S. Kieffer and William Blake; Dayton, Virginia: Ruebush, Kieffer & Co., 1886.
- The Zion Songster No. 2; for Sabbath Schools, edited by Aldine S. Kieffer; Dayton, Virginia: Ruebush, Kieffer & Co., 1887.
- The Star of Bethlehem, by J. H. Hall, J. H. Ruebush, and A. S. Kieffer; Dayton, Virginia: Ruebush, Kieffer, & Co., 1889.
- Crowning Day, No. 2; a Collection of Gospel Songs for Sunday schools, revivals, young people's meetings, etc., by J. H. Hall, J. H. Ruebush, A. S. Kieffer, et al.; Dayton, Virginia: Ruebush, Kieffer, & Co., 1896.
