= Massanutten, Virginia =

- CDP
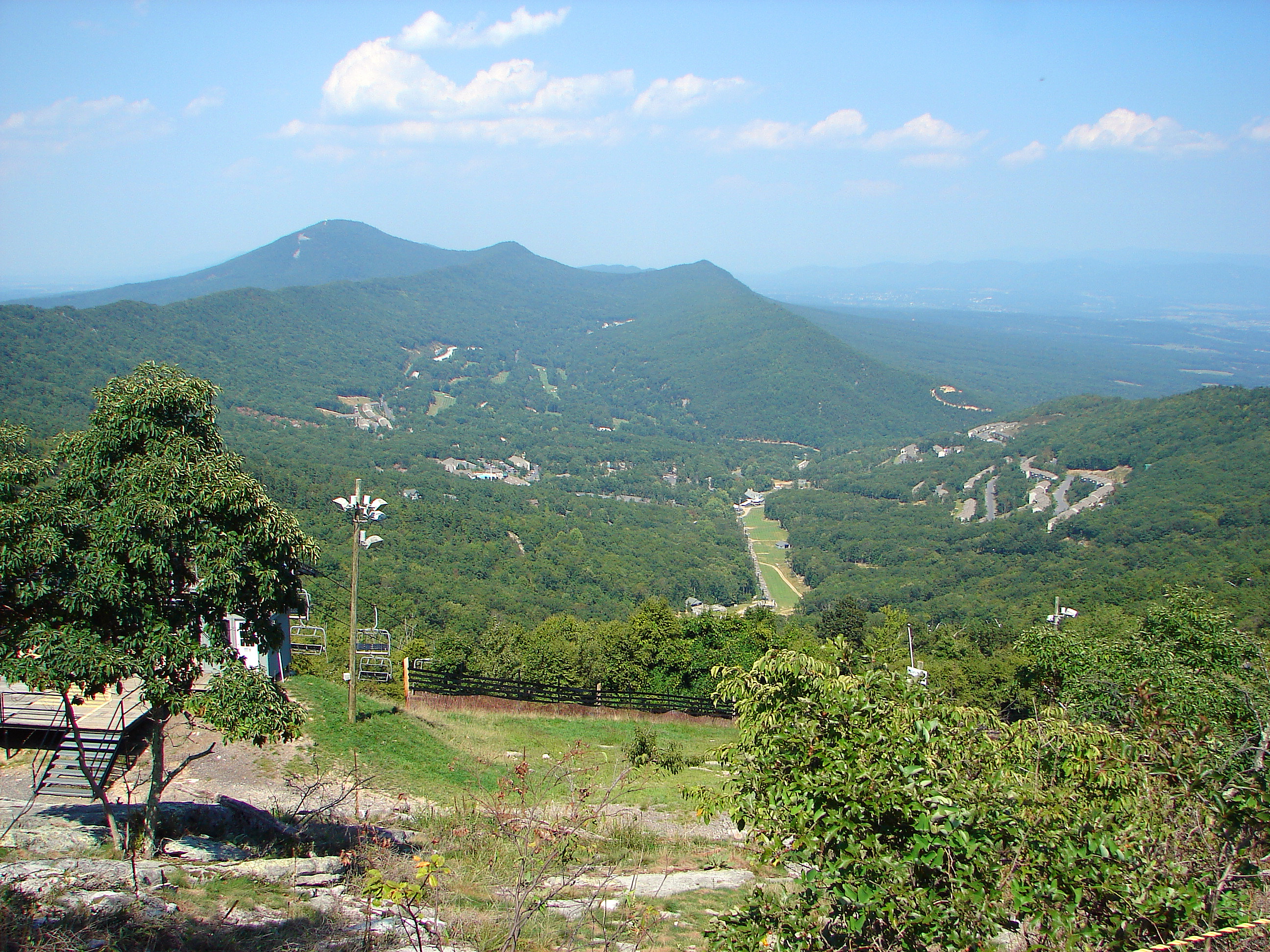

- Location of the Massanutten CDP within the Rockingham County

- Location within the state of Virginia
- Coordinates: 38°24′16″N 78°44′24″W
- Country: United States
- State: Virginia
- County: Rockingham

Area
  - Total: 14.3 sq mi (37.1 km^{2})
  - Land: 14.3 sq mi (37.1 km^{2})
  - Water: 0 sq mi (0.0 km^{2})
- Elevation: 1,699 ft (518 m)

Population (2010)
  - Total: 2,291
  - Density: 160/sq mi (61.8/km^{2})
- Time zone: UTC−5 (Eastern (EST))
  - Summer (DST): UTC−4 (EDT)
- ZIP code: 22840
- Area code: 540
- FIPS code: 51-50030
- GNIS feature ID: 1867594

Massanutten is a census-designated place (CDP) in Rockingham County, Virginia, United States, built around a ski resort. As of the 2020 census, Massanutten had a population of 2,164. It is part of the Harrisonburg Metropolitan Statistical Area.

== Geography ==
Massanutten is located at 38°24′16″N 78°44′24″W (38.404566, −78.740120). It lies within a valley at the southern end of Massanutten Mountain.

According to the United States Census Bureau, the CDP has a total area of 14.3 square miles (37.1 km^{2}), all land.

== Demographics ==
|2020= 2164

Historical population
Census	Pop.	Note	%±
2000	1,945		—
2010	2,291		17.8%
2020	2,164		−5.5%
U.S. Decennial Census; 2010 2020

The first European-American to settle permanently in the area was Adam Miller (Mueller) (1703–1783), a native of Germany who arrived in 1726 and made his homestead near present-day Elkton.

At the 2000 census, there were 1,945 people, 751 households and 582 families residing in the CDP. The population density was 135.7 per square mile (52.4/km^{2}). There were 1,051 housing units at an average density of 73.3/sq mi (28.3/km^{2}). The racial makeup of the CDP was 95.12% White, 2.06% African American, 0.10% Native American, 0.67% Asian, 0.51% from other races, and 1.54% from two or more races. Hispanic or Latino of any race were 1.49% of the population.

There were 751 households which 35.4% had children under the age of 18 living with them, 67.6% were married couples living together, 6.1% had a female householder with no husband present, and 22.4% were non-families. 16.1% of all households were made up of individuals, and 3.3% had someone living alone who was 65 years of age or older. The average household size was 2.59 and the average family size was 2.91.

Age distribution was 24.3% under the age of 18, 5.9% from 18 to 24, 35.2% from 25 to 44, 25.1% from 45 to 64, and 9.5% who were 65 years of age or older. The median age was 37 years. For every 100 females there were 100.5 males. For every 100 females age 18 and over, there were 96.3 males.

The median household income was $61,316, and the median family income was $61,957. Males had a median income of $44,010 versus $27,596 for females. The per capita income for the CDP was $24,292. About 2.4% of families and 3.2% of the population were below the poverty line, including 2.1% of those under age 18 and none of those age 65 or over.

== History ==
The Rockingham Springs Hotel was the first resort developed at Massanutten. In 1875, Gerald T. Hopkins, a farmer, created a health spa from the natural springs. A three-story hotel was built in the vicinity of the family hunting cabin (Hunters Cabin), which still stands at the present-day Hopkins Park, near the intersection of Lanier Lane and Massanutten Drive. When the popularity of health resorts declined, the hotel was closed in 1915.

Sidney Lanier, a well-known poet, visited Rockingham Springs before taking a teaching position in literature at Johns Hopkins University. Lanier Lane roughly follows the route to the site of Rockingham Springs.

In the late 1960s the great-grandson of G.T. Hopkins, John L. Hopkins, envisioned a ski resort at Massanutten.

== Development and growth ==
In 1973, the Massanutten Development Corporation was chartered by John L. Hopkins III (President), the great-grandson of G.T. Hopkins, Leland Leachman, (Vice President) Donald Litten, Len LaSala (Del Webb employee appointed Massanutten general manager). One and one-half million dollars was paid to individual property owners to assemble 5,300 acre at a price of $100-$300/acre. One piece was purchased for $1000/acre. Hopkins invited the Del Webb Corporation to enter the partnership.

In 1974, an economic downturn caused the Webb Corp to become the major stockholder. In 1977, Dale Stancil, former owner of Bryce Resort, purchased the resort for $1.9 million and renamed the property Massanutten Village, Inc. In 1980, John Swaim of First Federal Corp. acquired the resort for $4.0 million. In 1984, the current owner, Great Eastern Resorts (C. Dice Hammer and Jim Lambert) acquired the resort for $3.0 million in a bankruptcy reorganization plan.

== Recreation ==
=== Snowsports ===
The ski lodge, constructed in 1972 for $800,000, was designed by Barry A. Berkus of Los Angeles and the ski slopes opened in 1973. An enlarged Snow Sports Learning Center was completed in 2014. Snowsports instructors are members of the Professional Ski Instructors of America (PSIA) and the American Association of Snowboard Instructors. Adaptive Instruction is offered through Therapeutic Adventures. The Massanutten ski team is a member of the Southern Alpine Racing Association. The Massanutten Ski Patrol are members of the National Ski Patrol.

=== Golf ===
The first golf course at Massanutten, the 18-hole par 72 Mountain Greens Golf Course, was completed in 1980. The 18-hole, par 65 Woodstone Meadows Golf Course opened in 1998.

=== Cycling and Mountain Biking ===
In May 1992, the sixth stage of the Tour DuPont was held from Hagerstown, MD to Massanutten. Lance Armstrong raced in the tour and Greg LeMond won the Tour.

The Massanutten Bike Park is served by a chairlift and consists of trails, marked as beginner, intermediate, advanced and expert, that switchback across the eastern slope of Massanutten Mountain.

There are over 15 miles of multi-use, non-motorized trails which are maintained by the Shenandoah Valley Bicycle Coalition on the Western Slope of Massanutten Mountain.

The annual Massanutten HOO-HA! mountain bike race is held in June and the annual Massanutten YEE-HA! Downhill Mountain Bike Race is held in April, the second race of the Downhill Southeast Series.
