= Harmonia Sacra =

1832 Mennonite hymnal by Joseph Funk

- Author: Joseph Funk
- Original title: 'A Compilation of Genuine Church Music'
- Genre: Christian music
- Publisher: unknown
- Publication date: 1832

Harmonia Sacra is a Mennonite shape note hymn and tune book, originally published as A Compilation of Genuine Church Music in 1832 (Singers Glen, Virginia) by Joseph Funk (1778–1862).

The original publication was a "four-shape" shape note book using the shapes and syllables "faw, sol, law, and mi". Funk designed A Compilation of Genuine Church Music for use in singing schools. It contained 208 pages, including rudiments of music and tunes harmonized for three voices. Funk released a second edition in 1835, and a third in 1842. The 1847 fourth edition was the first publication by Joseph Funk and Sons at Singers Glen. The name was changed to Harmonia Sacra in 1851, using the original title as a subtitle. In 1851, Funk also changed from the four-shapes to the seven-shape shape note system. Rather than adopt the Aikin system, Funk devised his own. Further editions were released, including 1860, 1866, 1878, 1980 and 1993. In 1866, called the 12th edition, the three voice parts were expanded to four. After 1878 (17th edition), the rudiments of music were deleted. In 1980, the 24th edition, the format was changed, changing the old four stave oblong tunebook to an upright modern soprano-alto-tenor-bass format. The 25th edition (1993) restored the old oblong tunebook format, as well as the rudiments of music and 27 three-voice hymns from the first and second editions. A newly typeset 26th edition is available. An online edition of the 26th edition provides tunes in both four- and seven-shape settings.

According to the Mennonite Encyclopedia this "music textbook ... has reached a total issue of nearly 100,000 copies." The book is still is in use by Mennonites today. Most singings are held in the Dayton-Harrisonburg area of Virginia.
