= Daniel Harrison House =

Historic house in Virginia, United States

- U.S. National Register of Historic Places
- Virginia Landmarks Register
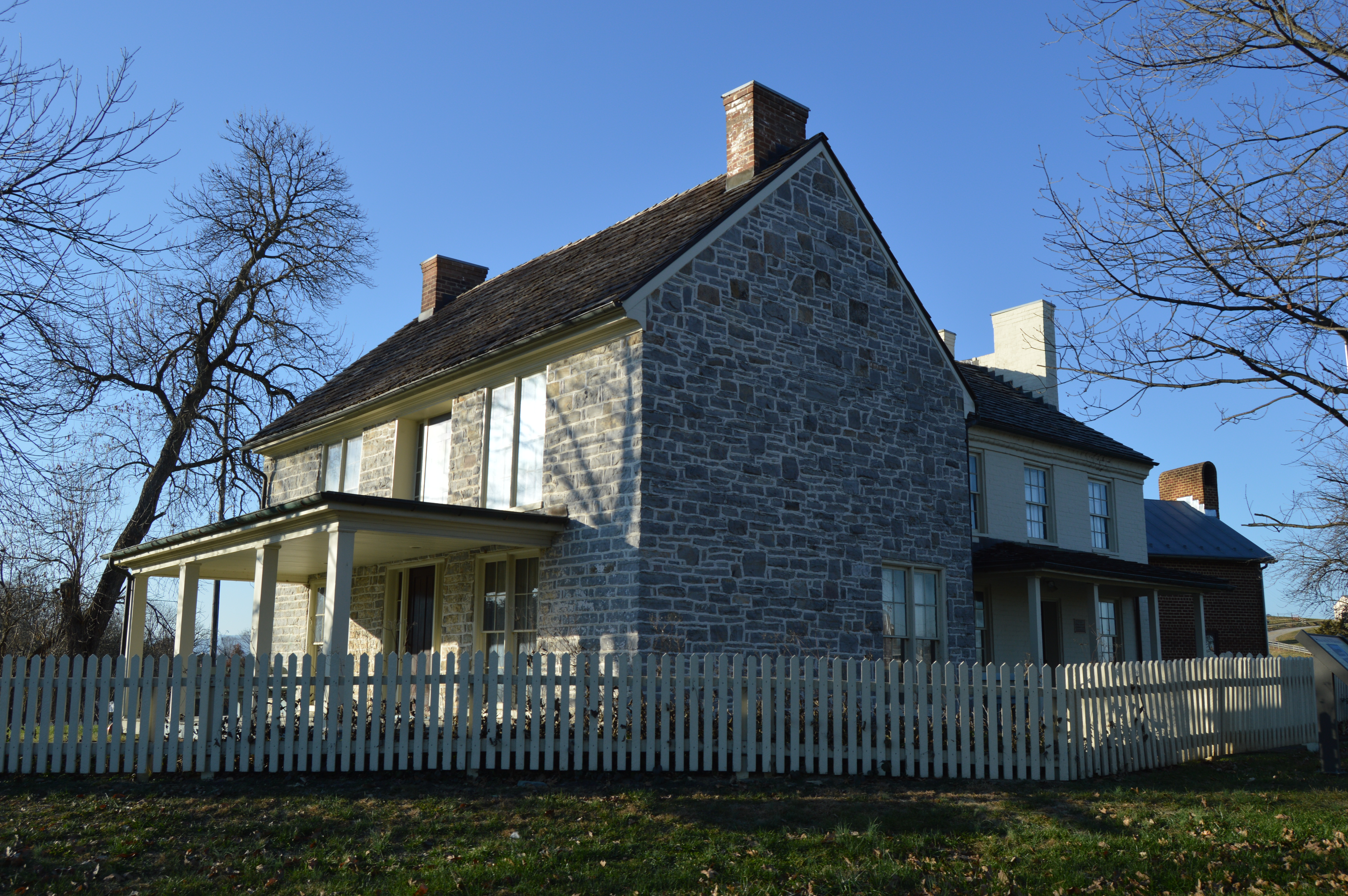
- Front and southeastern side of the house

- Location within Virginia Location within the United States
- Location: NE of Dayton on VA 42, Dayton, Virginia
- Coordinates: 38°25′4″N 78°56′10″W
- Area: 9.9 acres (4.0 ha)
- Built: 1748
- Built by: Harrison, Daniel
- NRHP reference No.: 73002056
- VLR No.: 206-0001

Significant dates
- Added to NRHP: July 24, 1973
- Designated VLR: June 19, 1973

Daniel Harrison House, also known as Fort Harrison, is a historic home located near Dayton, Rockingham County, Virginia. The original structure was built in 1748 as a two-story, three bay limestone dwelling, with a steep gable roof and wide chimney caps. A brick extension was added in the early 1800s. It was originally surrounded by a palisade and was reported to have an underground passage to the nearby spring. During the French and Indian War, the legislature of Virginia designated the house and surrounding property "Fort Harrison." The house is one of the oldest in the Shenandoah Valley, and is closely associated with the early history of Rockingham County.

The home's original owner, Captain Daniel Harrison, was one of the first to use the plentiful supply of limestone for building. His stone house is referred to in one of his first deeds, dated February 28, 1749, in Rockingham County Deed Book 2, p. 586 - "Daniel Harrison, Gent. to Arthur Johnson, 190 acres; 10 acres; Cook's Creek–Harrison's stonehouse". In 1745, Captain Harrison was appointed by the Court of Orange County, along with brother John and Robert Cravens, as overseer to lay out and clear the old Indian Road – "The Long Grey Trail" – through what is now Rockingham County. This was destined to be the most traveled highway in the Shenandoah Valley. In 1751, Capt. Harrison became Under Sheriff of Augusta County

The site was listed on the National Register of Historic Places in 1973.

Fort Harrison is open to the public on Friday and Saturday in the summer and by appointment.
