= 2018 Cargill strike =

Strike action in Dayton, Virginia, United States

The 2018 Cargill strike was an American protest held by employees of the Dayton, Virginia United States plant of Cargill, a poultry manufacturing corporation.

== Background ==
Plans of employees organizing and a union forming date back to late 2017 in the wake of reported employee abuse and poor working conditions at the plant. In November 2017, a solidarity community group, known as the Community Solidarity with Poultry Workers, formed in the wake of claimed employee abuse at Cargill. Specifically employees, and former employees claimed that the company would "dispose" of employees and not offer them proper health treatment.

In February 2018, it was reported that local activists and Cargill union organizers had filed a charge against Cargill for retaliation against their employees for forming and organizing. Within the charge, the organizing committees stated that within the prior six months Cargill had retaliated against four union supporters by terminating employment, denying overtime opportunities, assigning "less favorable jobs," and denying or reducing work opportunities and hours – "solely because of their union activities."

In response to terminated employees, the community of Dayton organized a series of protests during the spring of 2018 to raise awareness of the strikes, and union organizing. The protests took place outside of the factory, but moved towards the parking lot as union leaders demanded to meet with plant leadership. In response the Dayton Police were dispatched and arrested nine protesters for trespassing on private property.

== Reactions ==
=== Rockingham County ===
The Dayton Police Department were dispatched and arrested nine individuals for protesting on private property.

=== Cargill ===
Cargill denied that the protestors and organized workers had scheduled a meeting with the plant's leadership, and denied that they fired three employees for forming a union.

There is a great deal of misinformation and confusion circulating around today’s events. We would like to clarify with what we know at this time:

First, there are claims that Cargill fired three employees for their efforts to organize a union. While we can’t share specific information about personnel matters, we can confirm that Cargill does not fire anyone for their union beliefs or for participation in a Union. Our Statement on Human Rights clearly states that Cargill follows the National Labor Relations Act, respecting freedom of association and the right to collectively bargain, enabling employees to join a union and voluntarily negotiate. We respect the rights and freedoms of our employees to either choose or not choose union representation as the law allows. In fact, there are dozens of unions who represent Cargill employees at facilities across the country.

Secondly, it is our understanding that several protestors at the facility were arrested by the Dayton Police Department. While we fully support the right to protest, it must be done legally and ethically. Any questions or concerns related to the arrests should be raised with the police department.

Thirdly, protest organizers are claiming that protestors had a meeting scheduled with Cargill leadership, who then backed out of the meeting. We can confirm that no meeting with management was scheduled

— Cargill statement., Cargill

== See also ==
- Criticisms of Cargill
