= Zirkle Mill =

- U.S. National Register of Historic Places
- Virginia Landmarks Register
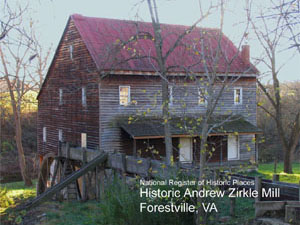
- Historic Andrew Zirkle Mill in Forestville, VA. Circa 1760

- Location within Virginia Location within the United States
- Nearest city: Quicksburg, Virginia
- Coordinates: 38°42′50″N 78°43′33″W
- Area: 2.2 acres (0.89 ha)
- Built: 1760 est.
- Architect: Zirkle Brothers
- NRHP reference No.: 83003316
- VLR No.: 085-0122

Significant dates
- Added to NRHP: February 10, 1983
- Designated VLR: December 14, 1982

The Andrew Zirkle Mill is a 1760s era grist mill located in the southern end of Shenandoah County, Virginia. The mill was added to the National Register of Historic Places in 1983 after being restored by Glenn Hofecker, the owner at the time. The mill is cited as a prime example of the architecture and construction of grist mills and manufacturing facilities of its era.

== Virginia Historic Landmark ==
Built by German pioneers who moved to the area from Pennsylvania in the 1750s, the mill is a remnant of the culture, industriousness and vision of these early settlers. Its use, architecture, builders, owners and location place it in the forefront of early frontier life. Added to the Virginia Historic Landmark Registry in 1982.

== About the mill ==
In 1749, Thomas Lord Fairfax issued a land grant for 224 acres (91 ha) to George Brock. Brock sold this land in 1757 to Andrew Zirkle, who had arrived in the area in 1755 with four brothers, two sisters and his mother. Shortly thereafter, Andrew and his brothers built the mill.

While the exact date of the construction of the mill remains a mystery, there is a variety of evidence that shows it was built and in operation by 1781. Anecdotal evidence places its construction in the early 1760s.

The mill has a log frame and uses mortice and tenon construction. The main beams of the mill, of which there are six, are huge timber beams. These beams are one piece, each of which are 40 feet (12 m) long and over one foot square. The mill rests on a coursed rubblestone foundation built into the hillside. A portion of the mill foundation rests on solid bed of limestone that protrudes from the hill. There is also a large natural cleft in the rocks where the waterwheel now resides.

The waterwheel is fed by a mill race that extends nearly 1/2 mile upstream to the mill dam located on Holman's Creek. As it nears the mill, the water runs into a raised wooden flume to be fed to the Fitz Waterwheel. The waterwheel is 20½ feet in diameter and 2 feet (0.61 m) wide. It was manufactured by the Fitz Waterwheel company of Hanover, PA was installed in the spring of 1921.

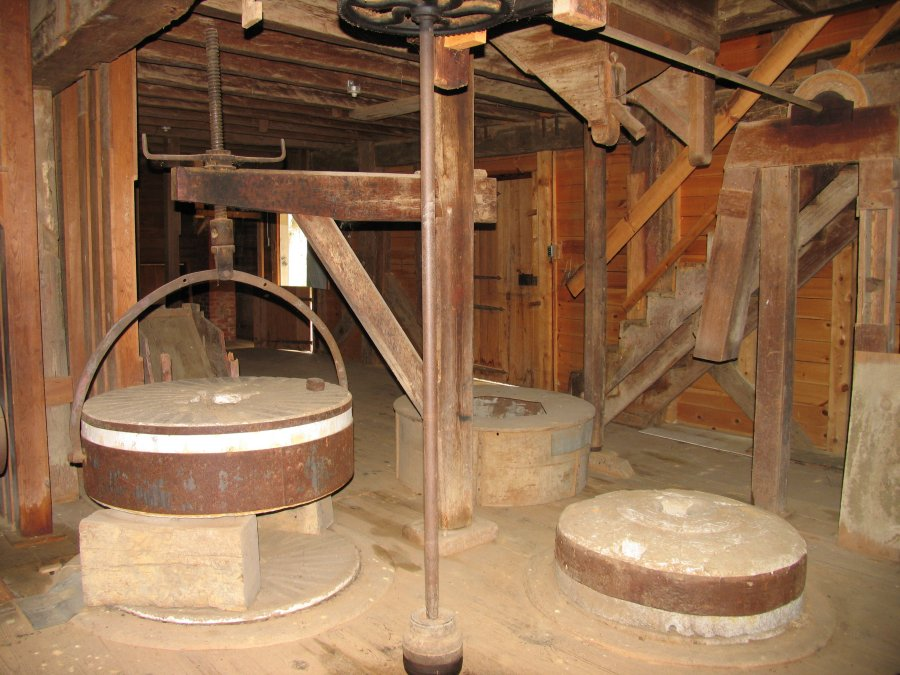
French quartz and granite stones

Inside the mill is a collection of equipment spanning the entire lifespan of the mill. The original granite and French quartz millstones are present, roller milling machines installed just before 1900, sifters, bolters, and other items. The mill also features a Fitz gearing installed in the basement that takes the power from the waterwheel and uses it to drive all the equipment.

== History of the mill ==
The American historian George Bancroft writes of contributions made by citizens to relieve "the poor of Boston" during the hardships caused by the blockading of the harbor after the Boston Tea Party. Bancroft specifically mentions contributions made by settlers in the Northern Shenandoah Valley, citing 132 barrels (21.0 m^{3}) of flour being brought into Winchester. The Boston Tea Party occurred in December 1773 and with the passage of the Intolerable Acts which contained the Boston Port Bill, the harbor was ordered closed June 1, 1774.

In "A History of Shenandoah County", written by Shenandoah Valley historian John W. Wayland, these contributions are cited and Wayland gives his interpretation of Bancrofts' writings, stating that mills of Shenandoah County provided some of this flour. It is family tradition that the Zirkle Mill was one of the sources for this flour. This claim is given further credence by the Shenandoah County Publick Claims which show that in 1781 Andrew Zirkle contributed six barrels of flour to the Continental Army.

The mill is mentioned in a 1784 petition from local residents to build a road from the mill east to the town of New Market, VA. Andrew Zirkle, his brother Michael and other residents signed the petition. The Order Book of Shenandoah County Court lists instructions for Michael Zirkle, Andrew Zirkle, Jacob Neff and Benjamin Fossett "view a way for a Road from Andrew Sircles Mill to Abraham Dusks Smith Shop on the Main Road" and that they report their findings to the next court.

In 1817, Andrew directed the executor of his will to sell the mill and distribute the proceeds among his descendants. The mill was subsequently sold to George Mowrey who was apparently his miller at the time. Mowery was unable to hold onto the mill and it passed through a number of owners until it was purchased by Peter Myers who lived just outside Forestville, VA in 1853.

War had once again come to the valley as the north and south faced off against each other in the Civil War. After driving Confederate General Jubal Early from the field at the Battle of Fisher's Hill, Union General Phillip Sheridan pursued him as far south as Harrisonburg and McGaheysville, Virginia. There he stopped as he feared Confederate Troops from the Richmond area might move to his rear and trap his army between two forces.

General Sheridan received orders from General Ulysses S. Grant to burn "the breadbasket of the Confederacy." Sheridan then executed a strategic retreat northward towards Winchester and Union troops rode the width of the valley setting fields, barns and mills ablaze.

At the Zirkle Mill, the miller Samuel Hockman climbed the hill facing the mill. In the distance he could see the mills at nearby Moore's Store, Harpinetown and the Myers farm being set ablaze. He ran and got a Union Flag, climbed onto the roof of the mill and hung it there.

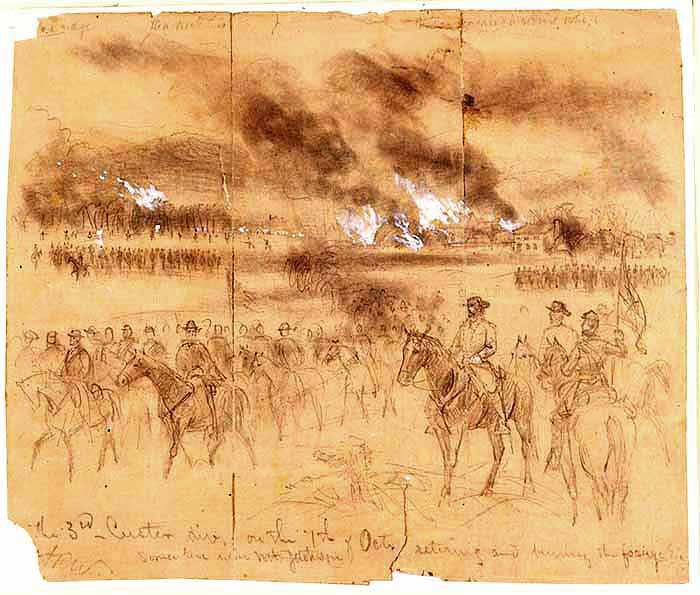
Union Cavalry under Brig. Gen. Geo. Armstrong Custer burn farms and crops outside Mt. Jackson, VA -1864

He ran to meet the Union Cavalry officers in the road. The flag and his pleadings convinced them of his sincerity and the troops were ordered to leave the mill alone. It was the only mill on Holman's creek to survive that day. The General in charge of the Union Cavalry in this area was none other than George Armstrong Custer.

After the war, the local people branded Hockman as a Union sympathizer and refused to patronize the mill and soon the owner Peter Myers was forced to sell. Joseph Andrick purchased the mill in 1867 and operated it until his death in 1893. His sons Casper and Charles ran the mill for a number of years and upgraded the mill by installing roller milling equipment. Much of this equipment is still in the mill today.

After the Andrick brothers sold the mill in 1906 it again passed through a number of owners hands each trying his hand at the milling trade. Finally, in the late 1940s, no longer able to compete with modernized factories the mill finally ceased operations after 180 years.

== Mill campaign ==
The mill sat neglected for many years until in 1980 it was bought by a North Carolina carpenter named Glen Hofecker, who restored it to working order. It was during this time that the mill was added to the Virginia Historic Landmark Register in 1992 and then placed on the National Register of Historic Places in 1993.

Hofecker sold the mill at auction in 1992 to Bowman Fruit Sales, LLC controlled by Gordon D. "Sonny" Bowman, a local orchardist.

Bowman Fruit Sales owned the mill for 11 years and then decided to sell it. The mill was placed on the open market for a year with no takers. Finally, the Frontier Culture Museum of Staunton, Virginia came calling. They were looking for a mill to be the centerpiece of an exhibit on 1850s life and announced plans to move the upper portion of the mill to museum property in Staunton, Virginia. Two Zirkle descendants, Rob Andrews and Sherryl Andrews Belinsky formed the Save the Zirkle Mill Foundation (now called Old Dominion Preservation) and conducted a year-long campaign to save the mill.

The Frontier Culture Museum is state funded and is restricted by acquisition laws of the Commonwealth of Virginia. The purchase of the mill property was highly irregular. After taking the case to the State Attorney General's office, the Attorney General issued an opinion stating that the Governor of Virginia must approve the acquisition of the mill by the museum as dictated by state laws.

In July 2005, Governor Mark Warner denied the acquisition of the mill by the museum. Bowman Fruit Sales waited a few months and quietly put the mill up for sale again. While it had become famous, there were few takers. Andrews and Belinsky made an offer for the mill and on January 5, 2006 became the owners of the Andrew Zirkle Mill.

== A new beginning ==
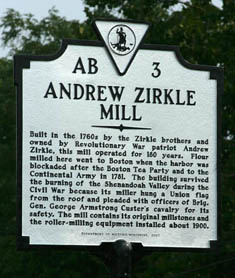
Zirkle Mill Historic Highway Marker

The new owners have begun the process of bringing the mill back to life. While the project is expected to take many years, plans are being made and events have been held to further this goal. Signage has been added to the property and recently a historic highway marker was added in the parking lot across the road from the mill. The Highway Marker was donated by the Knight-Patty Fund of the Virginia Society of the Sons of the American Revolution.

A number of site improvements are underway and a portion of the grounds has been turned to agricultural use. Due to the numerous safety improvements required and the need to proceed slowly with changes, the mill is currently closed to the public.
