= Singers Glen Historic District =

Historic district in Virginia, United States

- U.S. National Register of Historic Places
- U.S. Historic district
- Virginia Landmarks Register
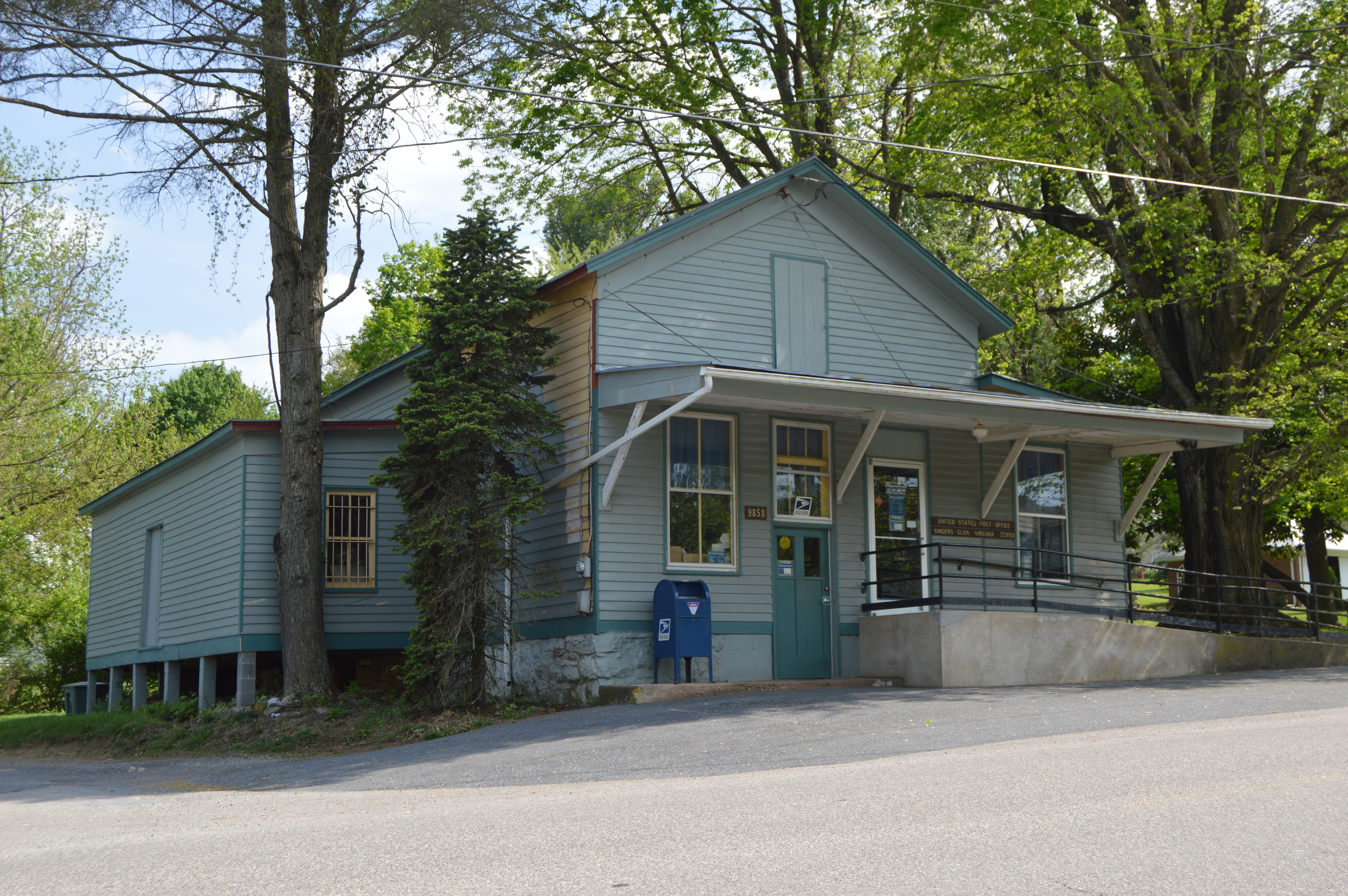
- Post office

- Location within Virginia Location within the United States
- Location: Junction of Kiffer and Singers Glen Roads at Singers Glen, Virginia
- Coordinates: 38°32′16″N 78°55′02″W
- Area: 125 acres (51 ha)
- Built: 1809
- Architectural style: Gothic, Stick/eastlake
- NRHP reference No.: 78003043
- VLR No.: 082-0125

Significant dates
- Added to NRHP: January 20, 1978
- Designated VLR: December 21, 1976

Singers Glen Historic District is a national historic district located at Singers Glen, Rockingham County, Virginia. The district encompasses 65 contributing buildings and 2 contributing sites in the village of Singers Glen. The district retains much of its late 19th-century air and most of its original buildings. Notable buildings include the Glen Farm (John S. Funk House, c. 1889), The Solomon Funk Farm (c. 1857), Edwin E. Funk House (Gray House, 1892), Swank Store and Post Office (c. 1890), T. Funk and Sons Store (1895), The Carriage Works (1826), Singers Glen Baptist Church (1888), United and Methodist Church (1895, 1905). Located in the district is the separately listed Joseph Funk House.

It was listed on the National Register of Historic Places in 1978.
