= Benjamin Carl Unseld =

American singer

B.C. Unseld
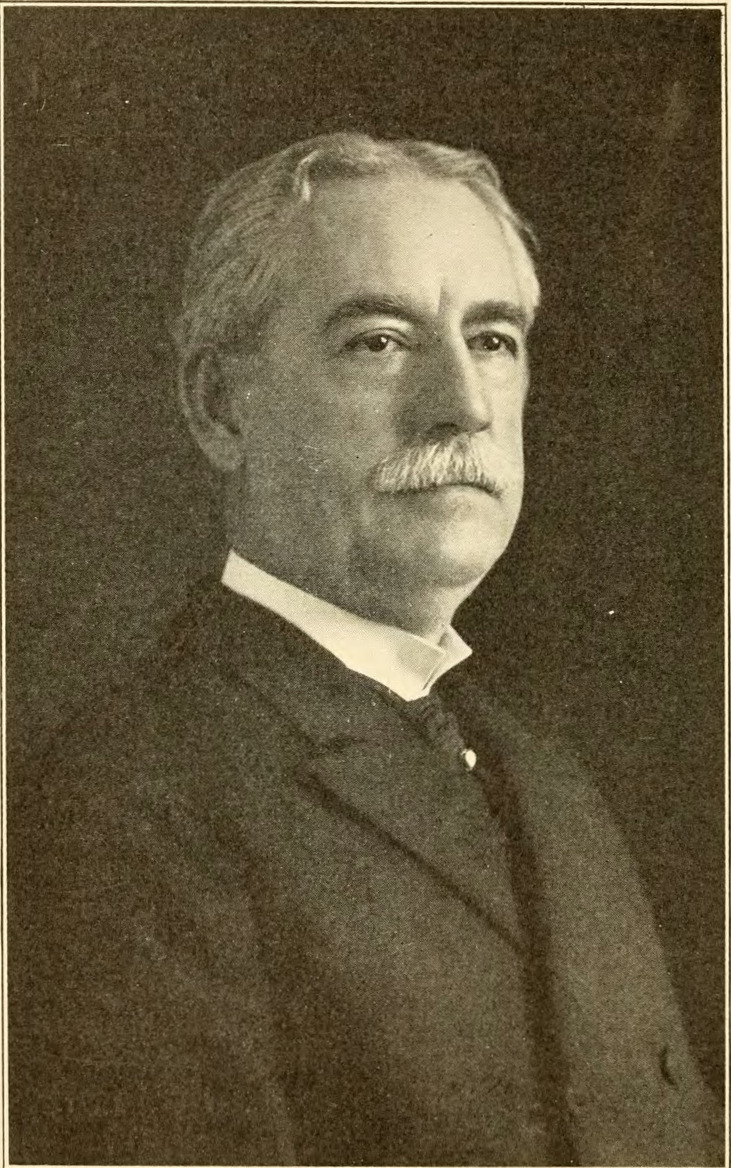

Background information
- Born: Benjamin Carl Unseld; October 18, 1843; Shepherdstown, West Virginia, United States
- Died: November 19, 1923 (aged 80) Lawrenceburg, Tennessee, United States
- Genres: Gospel music, Southern gospel
- Occupation: Vocalist/singer
- Instrument: Vocals

Benjamin Carl Unseld (October 18, 1843 – November 19, 1923), better known as B. C. Unseld, was a gospel music teacher, composer, and publisher.

== Biography ==
Unseld was born October 18, 1843, in Shepherdstown, Virginia. In the early 1860s, he moved to Pennsylvania. Though mostly self-taught, he sang in the choir and accepted a position as organist at the Methodist Church in Columbia, Pennsylvania. He studied music under Eben Tourjée and Theodore F. Seward. B. C. Unseld taught at the New England Conservatory of Music in Boston, Massachusetts, and was the school's first secretary. Later he taught at Fisk University in Nashville, Tennessee, and was the first principal of the Virginia Normal School of Music. Unseld and Seward, with Biglow and Main publishers, imported John Curwen's Tonic Sol-fa method of shape note music and promoted it. The method was never widely received in the United States.

During his lifetime, he worked with the Biglow & Main Company (New York City), Fillmore Music House (Cincinnati, Ohio) and the Lorenz Publishing Company (Dayton, Ohio). In 1911, Unseld moved to Lawrenceburg, Tennessee, to serve as dean of the new James D. Vaughan School of Music, one part of that famed entrepreneur's publishing enterprise. After 1914 he also served as editor of The Vaughan Family Visitor, the company's monthly house periodical. Unseld died in Lawrenceburg on November 19, 1923, but was not buried there. His wife returned with his body to "Old Virginia." He is buried in historic Elmwood Cemetery in Shepherdstown, West Virginia.

== Works ==
The Tonic Sol-Fa Music Reader (with Theodore Seward, 1880), The Choral Standard (1895), Fillmore's School Singer for Day Schools, Juvenile Classes and Teachers' Institutes (with J. H. Fillmore, 1895), and Progress in Song (with E. T. Hildebrand, 1911). B. C. Unseld prepared the rudiments of music for A. S. Kieffer's popular Temple Star. Unseld's tunes accompany hymns by James Rowe and Fanny J. Crosby. His most popular musical piece was entitled "Twilight Is Stealing", written with Aldine S. Kieffer.

== Legacy ==
B. C. Unseld was inducted into the Southern Gospel Music Hall of Fame in 2004.
