= Peter Paul House =

Historic house in Virginia, United States

- U.S. National Register of Historic Places
- Virginia Landmarks Register
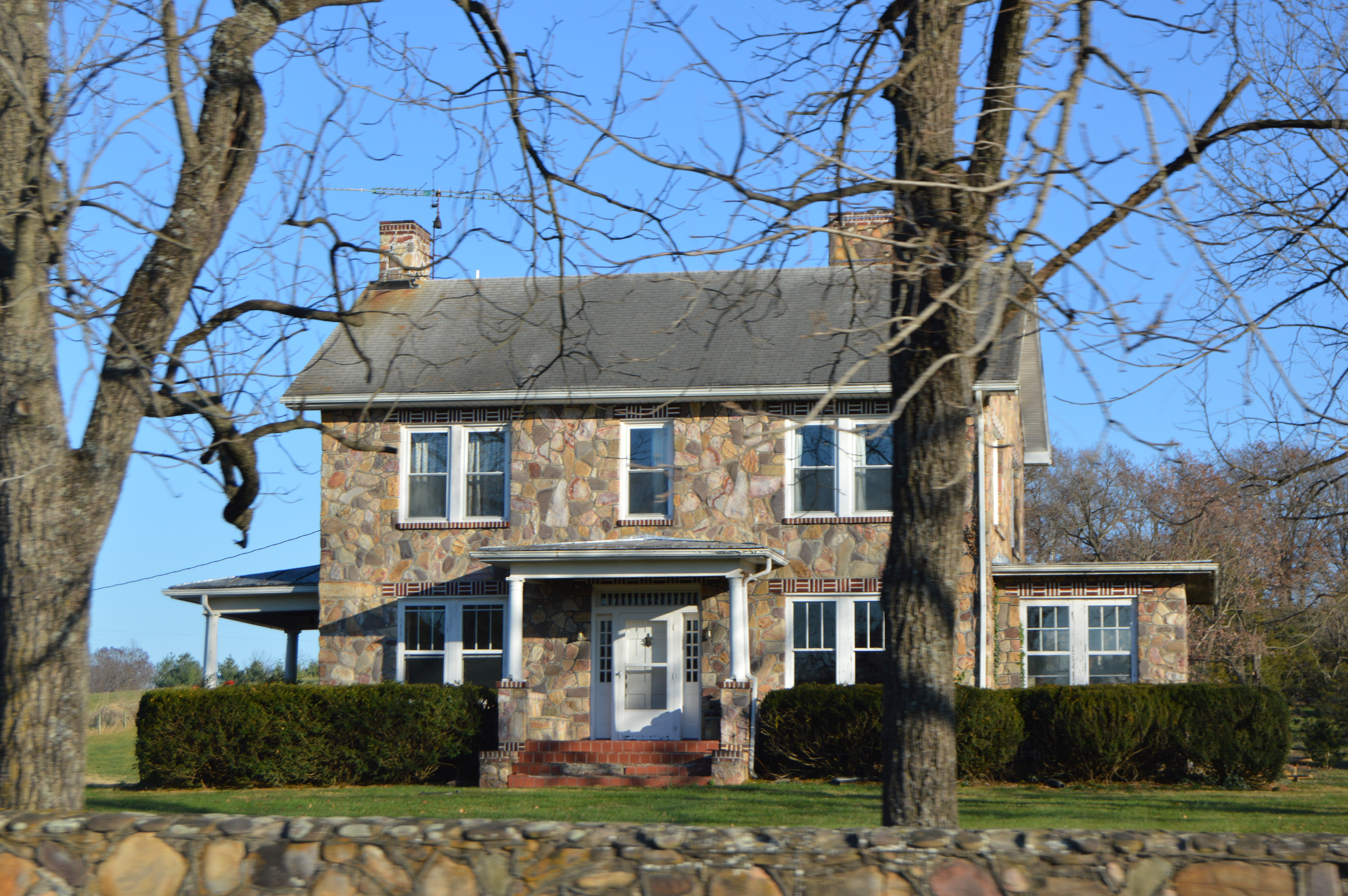
- Front of the house

- Location within Virginia Location within the United States
- Location: North of Dayton on VA 701, near Dayton, Virginia
- Coordinates: 38°25′47″N 78°56′20″W
- Area: 5 acres (2.0 ha)
- Built: c. 1810, c. 1829
- Built by: Peter Paul
- Architectural style: Rhenish Plan
- NRHP reference No.: 79003082
- VLR No.: 082-0031

Significant dates
- Added to NRHP: December 28, 1979
- Designated VLR: October 16, 1979

Peter Paul House is a historic home located near Dayton, Rockingham County, Virginia. It was built about 1810, and is a two-story, two-bay, stuccoed Rhenish Plan log dwelling. It has a gable roof and rubble limestone chimney. A three-bay brick ell was added about 1829. It is one of a small group of Continental farmhouses surviving as relics of the heavy Swiss and German settlement in the Shenandoah Valley.

It was listed on the National Register of Historic Places in 1979.
