= Virginia Old Order Mennonite Conference =

Anabaptist Christian denomination

The Virginia Old Order Mennonite Conference, also called Cline Mennonites or Cline-Showalter group, is an Old Order Mennonite group who use horse-drawn carriages for transportation. They separated from the Virginia Mennonite Conference in 1901. The members of the group speak English only, unlike almost all other horse and buggy Old Order Mennonite groups, who speak Pennsylvania German as their first language. In recent years the group sometimes uses the name "Riverdale Old Order Mennonite Church".

== History ==
In the 1880s and 1890s change became stronger among the Mennonites in Virginia. The English language and Sunday Schools had already been introduced, but now the influence of John F. Funk and John Coffman, whose sister was married to Virginia bishop Lewis J. Heatwole, grew. In 1894, when liberal bishop Lewis Heatwole became the sole bishop of the Middle District. The conservatives then started to accumulate a number of charges against bishop Lewis Heatwole. Conservative bishop Samuel Heatwole and two other men were expelled in 1898. The conflict became more and more severe and on March 31, 1901, a conservative group of 71 members, organized around bishop Samuel Heatwole, was disowned. In 1902 bishops from Indiana and Pennsylvania came to Virginia to perform communion and baptism among the expelled group. John Dan Wenger (1871-1967) was ordained as minister for this new Old Order Mennonite group in the same year.

In the history of Virginia Old Order Mennonite Conference there was no split over the question whether automobiles should be introduced, as in most of the other Old Order Mennonite groups in the early decades of the 20th century, but there was a division in 1952/3, "primarily because of personality differences between Bishop John Dan Wenger and Preacher Russel Cline". One third of members of the Virginia Old Order Mennonite Conference left with bishop John Dan Wenger and formed the John Dan Wenger Mennonites.

Another divisions occurred in 2006/7 with the help of bishops from Lancaster County, Pennsylvania and Ontario. The new group under bishop Lloyd Wenger had 99 members. In 2007 the new group ordained two preachers and in 2010 a deacon, all by lot.

Around the year 2010 the main group (Cline-Showalter) founded a new settlement in Greenfield, Ohio, with about 35 to 40 persons attending service there. The families there are mainly farming and dairying.

== Customs and belief ==
Virginia Old Order Mennonite Conference is in most aspects similar to the Groffdale Conference except for the use of language. The members use rubber tires on their tractors for field work. Many members of the Old Order Mennonite Conference are farmers or hold farm-related jobs.

== Membership and settlements ==
The adult membership of the Virginia Old Order Mennonite Conference in 1957 was 200. In 1990 there was an estimated adult membership of 400 in this group. In 2008/9 membership was 500 in 4 congregations, three of them in Virginia around Dayton and one in Ohio. In 2012 the average Sunday morning adult attendance of the group was in the 450-475 range.
