= Surrogate colonialism =

Concept in anthropology

Surrogate colonialism is a term used most notably by anthropologist Scott Atran in his essay "The Surrogate Colonization of Palestine 1917–1939" to describe a type of colonization project whereby a foreign power encourages and provides support for a settlement project of a non-native group over land occupied by an indigenous people. For Atran, the mission of Ashkenazi Zionism in Palestine is a form of "surrogate colonialism" because it was forged based on a strategic consensus with the ruling British Empire. The surrogate colonialism, Atran further notes, is one of the major contributing factors to the Balfour Declaration, which encouraged and legitimized Zionist settlement in Mandatory Palestine. Sociologist Ran Greenstein claims both Zionist settlement in Palestine and White settlement in South Africa are examples of surrogate colonization since in both, most of settlers did not come from the ranks of the principal colonizing power of the time: the British Empire in the case of Palestine and the Dutch Empire, later the British Empire, in the case of South Africa.

In other academic and non-academic settings, the term has been more loosely adopted and used figuratively to describe different forms of indirect domination, especially in post-colonial context. For example, it has been used to refer to the compliance of native rulers with the dominance of foreign power. For example, Geoff Kiangi uses it to describe African wars fought by African leaders but instigated from former colonial masters. In his analysis of Arab regimes in the Middle East, Dr. Mohammad Manzoor Alam claims that even so-called "rejectionist" rulers, who openly declared hostility to Western dominance, were in fact exemplifying "surrogate" or "internal" colonialism since they were silently compliant with Western rule. Similarly, Editor of the Indian Defence Review, Bharat Verma, blamed the Chinese government for treating Pakistan “as an extension of its war machine and a surrogate colony”.

"Surrogate Colonism" has also been used to describe neocolonialism. In a 1983 speech at the United Nations Conference on Trade and Development in Belgrade, Indian Prime Minister Indira Gandhi stated:

"I am a soul in agony. As one who feels passionately about freedom, I cannot but be alarmed at the continuing pushing domination, the new methods and forms of colonialism. This is all the more pernicious because less obvious and recognizable. Except for a few places, the visible presence of foreign rule has gone. We are free to run our affairs and yet, are we not bound by a new type, a surrogate colonialism? How else shall we describe the power of and the pressure exerted through the monopoly control of capital; the withholding of superior technology; the political use of grain; the manipulation of information, so subtle and subliminal in influencing minds and attitudes? Is it not time for us to pause from our daily concerns to ponder over the new dependency? Instead of reacting, should we the developing not think of acting on our own?"

== See also ==
- Anabaptist settler colonialism
- Zionism as settler colonialism
