= John Dan Wenger Mennonites =

Anabaptist Christian denomination

The John Dan Wenger Mennonites are an Anabaptist Christian denomination that belongs to the Old Order Mennonites. They use horse and buggy transportation and are mainly located in Virginia. Under the leadership of Bishop John Dan Wenger, they separated from the Virginia Old Order Mennonite Conference in either 1952 or 1953.

The group was named "Old Order Mennonites, Wenger (Virginia)" by Donald Kraybill (2010), and are members of the Mennonite World Conference. They now refer to themselves as "Original Virginia Conference of Old Order Mennonites."

== History ==
In the 1880s and 1890s, the Virginia Mennonites had, in large part, adopted the English language, and Sunday schools had become popular. Around this same time, John F. Funk and John Coffman (whose sister was married to Virginia Bishop Lewis J. Heatwole) became more influential in the Mennonite community. The catalyst for change was the liberal Bishop Lewis Heatwole. He became the sole bishop of the Middle District in 1894. Conservative members of the community had concerns about this consolidation of power and began to accumulate a number of charges against Bishop Lewis Heatwole. The rift intensified with the expulsion of conservative Bishop Samuel Heatwole and two other men in 1898. Then, on March 31, 1901, a conservative group of 71 members, organized around Bishop Samuel Heatwole, was disowned. This disowned group continued to function. In fact, in 1902, bishops from Indiana and Pennsylvania came to Virginia to perform communion and baptism among the expelled group. John Dan Wenger (1871–1967) was ordained as a minister for this new Old Order Mennonite group in the same year.

The Virginia Old Order Mennonite Conference under Wenger remained cohesive, over the years, on other issues that arose over modernity including the introduction of automobiles. It was not until 1952/3 that issues arose "primarily because of personality differences between Bishop John Dan Wenger and Preacher Russel Cline." Nearly one-third of the members of the Virginia Old Order Mennonite Conference sided with Wenger and formed a new group called the John Dan Wenger Mennonites.

In the 1990s and the early years of the first decade of the 21st century, there were ties between the John Dan Wenger Mennonites and the William Weaver group in Elkhart County, Indiana. Therefore, they are listed as "Old Order Mennonites Wenger/Weaver" by Kraybill and Hostetter in 2001. In search of a new settlement, around 2012, some families moved to Flemingsburg, Kentucky, where they own and operate dairy farms.

== Practice ==
In many aspects, the practice of the John Dan Wenger Mennonites is similar to that of the Groffdale Conference Mennonite Church, except that they do not speak Pennsylvania German and allow pneumatic tires on buggies, tractors and farm machinery. When they split from the Virginia Old Order Mennonite Conference, they banned electricity in homes and schools. John Dan Wenger Mennonites are more conservative than their parent group.

== Membership ==
In 1957, the group had 125 members. In 1995, it had approximately 250 members and, in 2008/9, it had a membership slightly over 300, all located in Virginia around Dayton. There were about 327 adult members in 2012.
