= Anabaptist settlers =

International settlers from Christian sects

Regions with significant populations
- Primarily North America and Latin America, with smaller communities elsewhere
- United States: >450,000
- Canada: >155,000
- Bolivia: ~150,000
- Mexico: ~100,000
- Paraguay: ~40,000
- Belize: 15,440
- Brazil: ~8,000
- Argentina: ~4,000
- Peru: ~2,500
- Uruguay: ~2,000
- Colombia: ~1,100
- Suriname: Several hundred
- Angola: Dozens

Languages
- Pennsylvania German, Plautdietsch, Hutterite German, English, Spanish, Standard German, Portuguese

Religion
- Anabaptism (Amish, Mennonites, Hutterites)

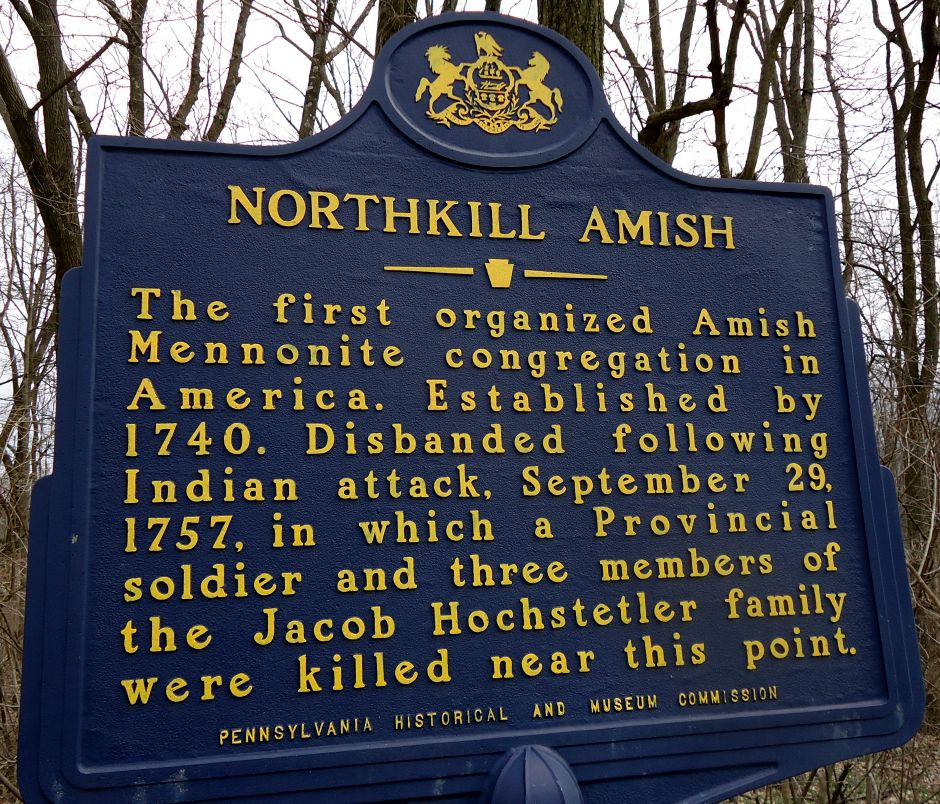
Historical marker for the Northkill Amish Settlement, an 18th-century Amish settlement destroyed by Lenape and Shawnee people who resented encroachment on their lands.

Anabaptists, including the Amish settlers, Hutterites settlers, and Mennonites settlers, have played a role in settler colonialism since the 1700s, in regions such as Eastern Europe, North America, and Latin America. The Russian Mennonites were invited to Novorossiya (what is now Southern Ukraine and Russia) by Catherine the Great following the Russo-Crimean Wars that resulted in the annexation of the Crimean Khanate; Mennonites settled on and farmed land that had been or would be ethnically cleansed of the Indigenous Crimean Tatar and Nogai populations. In the United States, Amish people, Hutterites, and Mennonites settled and farmed land after American Indian populations were displaced. In Canada, Hutterite and Mennonite settlers were incentivized to settle and cultivate farmland on the western Prairies following the displacement of Cree and Métis peoples, part of state-supported efforts to increase the white population. Across Latin America, Mennonite colonization has been seen as a driver of environmental damage, notably deforestation of the Amazon rainforest through land clearance for agriculture. While Mennonite communities are often called "colonies", some Mennonite communities in Africa avoid the term due to the legacy of European colonialism. In the 21st century, some Mennonites have begun to reckon with the Mennonite legacy of settler colonialism and its relationship with their tradition of pacifism as a historic peace church.

== About ==
There have never been Anabaptist states, but Anabaptists have participated in surrogate colonialism. While the majority of Anabaptists worldwide are non-white in the 21st century, historically the Amish, Hutterites, and Mennonites were overwhelmingly white people of European descent for several centuries. While the Amish and Hutterites are still mostly white, most Mennonites are not. According to Professor John Eicher, author of Exiled Among Nations: German and Mennonite Mythologies in a Transnational Age, Mennonites "routinely sought out states with weak or amorphous borders where they could establish agrarian communities that were relatively free from state control", aiding in nation-states' attempts to colonize land and displace Indigenous peoples. On three continents within the span of 150 years, Eicher writes, Mennonites "sought indigenous lands confiscated by state authorities" with the aim of clearing and cultivating the land, aiding in government-supported settlement schemes. In the 21st century, scholars, historians, and Anabaptists themselves have begun to research and debate the Anabaptist role in settler colonialism, racism, antisemitism, and white supremacy, a legacy that may be perceived as at odds with the traditional Anabaptist dedication to pacifism.

In a review of Jeff Gundy's book Wind Farm, the author Daniel Shank Cruz has written that current debates about Mennonite settler colonialism are "long-overdue" and that "White Mennonite readers should feel uncomfortable...and should think about restorative ways of rectifying this violence." Cruz also states that Gundy has written that Mennonites across North America "live on stolen land", but that writing about the history of Mennonite settler colonialism is "incomplete because it has been recorded by whites."

According to the Anabaptist Mennonite Network, discussions about colonialism and racism among Anabaptists have been recent, despite the association of Anabaptist values with peace and social justice. They state that two contributing factors for this have been the Black Lives Matter movement and the increasing awareness of colonialism against the Indigenous peoples of North America.

As of 2020, Mennonite colonies in Latin America owned a combined amount of land that was larger than the Netherlands.

== Africa ==
While many Mennonite communities have traditionally been called "colonies", Mexican Old Order Mennonite families who have immigrated to Angola eschew the word "colony" due to the violent legacy of Portuguese colonialism in Africa. As part of a deal with a diamond mining corporation, the Mennonites have cleared and farmed almost 2,000 acres of land.

== Europe ==
Following the Russo-Crimean Wars, Catherine the Great invited German and Vistula delta Mennonites to settle in what is now Southern Ukraine. These supposedly "empty lands" were inhabited by Tatars. Mennonites of the Molotschna colony arrived in 1803 and lived in close proximity to the Nogais, as both Mennonites and Nogais were involved in sheepherding. The Nogais were a semi-nomadic Tatar Muslim ethnic group. The Nogais resented the Mennonite settlers and relations between the two groups were often mutually strained. Conflicts sometimes arose because the Mennonites objected to the Nogai practice of allowing cattle to freely roam and graze. As Christians, the Mennonites often held Islamophobic views and perceived Muslims as backwards nonbelievers. Mennonites and Nogais lived in close proximity until 1860, when Nogais departed from the region. Both landless and landed Mennonites had extensive share-pasturing contracts with Nogais, a practice that disadvantaged and harmed the Nogai economy and society. The Nogai exodus was caused by the practice of landless Mennonites leasing large tracts of Nogai land. The departure of Nogais caused a landlessness crisis among Mennonite colonists, as the Russian government then granted land leases to Bulgarian colonists. By October 1860, 35,000 Nogais had fled to Ottoman Turkey, leaving only 105 Nogais left in what is now Ukraine.

== North America ==
=== Canada ===
Mennonites of European descent first settled near what is now Waterloo, Ontario, in 1786, the traditional territory of the Attawandaron, Anishinaabeg and Haudenosaunee people on the Haldimand Tract, land that was granted in 1784 to support the Six Nations, but was instead sold to Mennonite settlers in 1805.

Low German Mennonite settlers from the Russian Empire first arrived in Manitoba in the 1870s. Treaty 1, Treaty 2, and the Manitoba Act of 1870 were ostensibly crafted to protect Indigenous rights, but treaties were broken by the Canadian government, who incentivized white European immigrants to settle on "empty space" that had been recently inhabited by various Indigenous peoples. White Mennonites of European descent were granted blocks of land in Treaty 1 territory, including the East Reserve in 1874 and the West Reserve in 1875, which originally belonged to Anishinaabe and Swampy Cree people. Although these land grants and privileges allowed Mennonites and other European settlers to enjoy religious and cultural freedom, thousands of Indigenous people were displaced and killed due to these policies.

Upon early Mennonite settlement in Western Canada, Indigenous peoples and Mennonite settlers also agreed to secret "handshake" treaties, as a way to signal they would "share the land and help each other out." Remembered through oral tradition in Indigenous communities, these treaties were often broken and forgotten by Mennonite settler groups.

In Western Canada, many Russian Mennonites settled on the Prairies. In Saskatchewan, the Canadian Mennonite Board of Colonization was established in 1922. Beginning in the 1920s, Mennonites and other settler groups, also settled unceded land in British Columbia, particularly in the Fraser Valley.

Conrad Grebel University College in Ontario, affiliated with the Mennonite Church Canada, has issued a "Territorial Acknowledgement" stating that "The Mennonites were the first permanent white settlers" of the region and that the college is located on "traditional territory of the Attawandaron (Neutral), Anishinaabeg, and Haudenosaunee peoples." According to the University of Waterloo's Mennonite Archives of Ontario, Mennonites were implicated in settler colonialism in the United States as well as "numerous subsequent colonial projects including in present-day Canada the settlement of Ontario (beginning in 1786), Manitoba (beginning in 1874), Saskatchewan (from 1891), Alberta (from 1894) and British Columbia (most after 1928)", Mexico, Paraguay, and other countries in Latin America.

During the Sixties Scoop, many Mennonite families adopted Indigenous children who had been removed from their families.

=== Mexico ===
Mennonites first arrived in Mexico in 1922. Mexican Mennonites descend from Canadian Mennonites who themselves were of Russian Mennonite descent. The settlement of Mennonite immigrants was supported by the Mexican government. Mennonite settlement contributed to adverse societal effects to and displacement of Indigenous and mestizo people. Plautdietsch-speaking Mennonite communities lived separately from Indigenous and mestizo Mexicans and did not try to assimilate to surrounding cultures. The settlement was shortly after the Mexican Revolution (1910-1920), during which land reform was a major political question. Mennonites came into conflict with mestizo and Indigenous Mexicans by gaining land that was already claimed.

=== United States ===
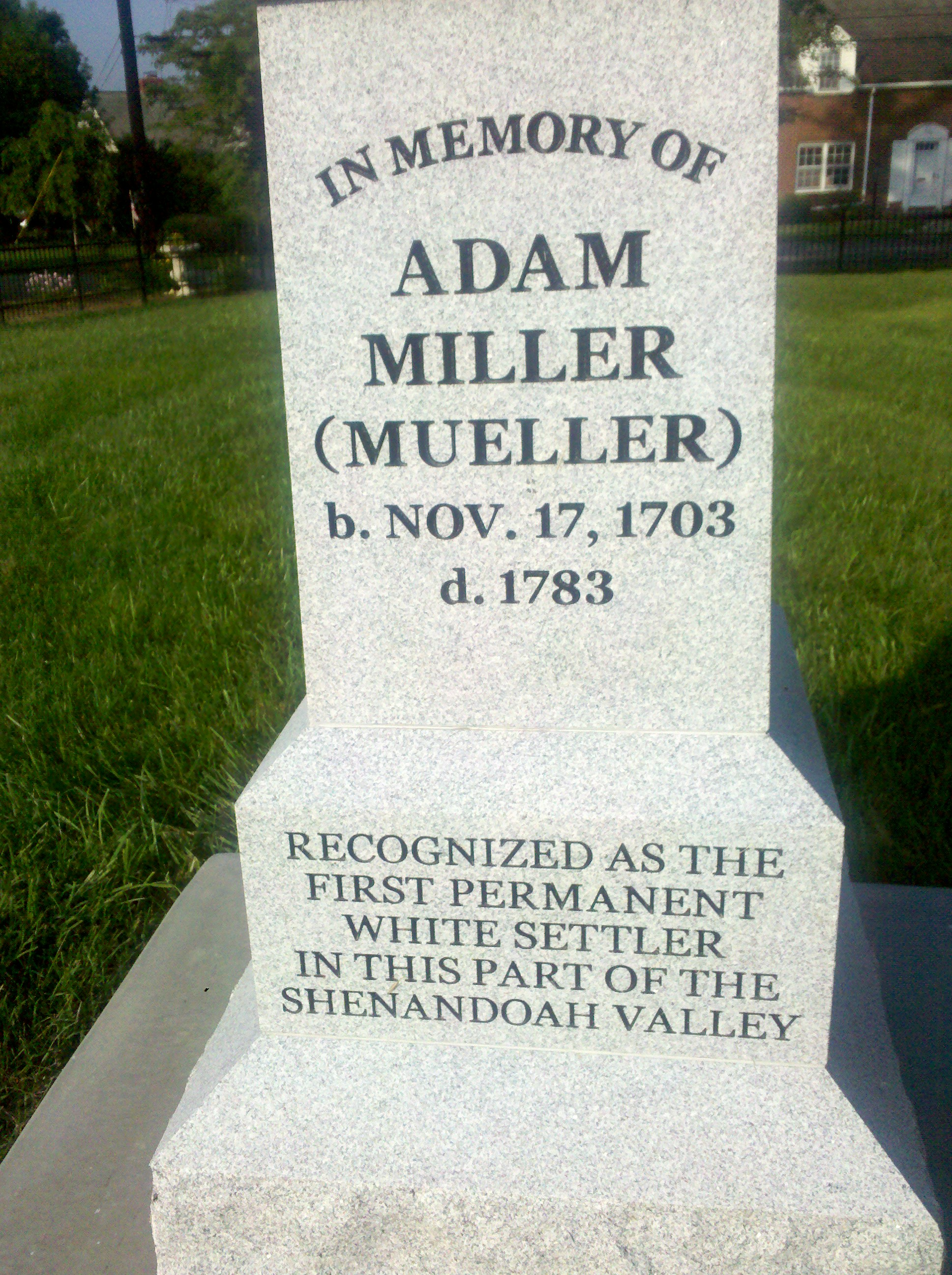
Monument to Adam Miller, a Mennonite and the first white settler of the Shenandoah Valley.

The first Anabaptist settlers in North America were German and Swiss Mennonites and Amish people who settled in the Province of Pennsylvania in the 1700s. From Pennsylvania, Anabaptists then settled in other colonies and later in additional US states. In some places, such as Washington and Johnson counties in Iowa, Amish people were the very first white settlers to settle on Indigenous land. Amish settlers arrived in Johnson and Washington counties in the 1840s.

The first Amish settlement in North America, the Northkill Amish Settlement in Pennsylvania, was destroyed in 1757 following the Hochstetler massacre. The massacre was committed during the French and Indian War by French-allied Native Americans who resented English encroachment on their land. The settlement had been located close to the edge of the legal boundary upon which European settlers were permitted by colonial authorities to settle.

Mennonites first arrived in Pennsylvania in 1683 and now live on traditional Lenape land. In 2023, the Chief of the Delaware Tribe of Indians visited the Mennonite Heritage Center in Harleysville, Pennsylvania, in order to ask Mennonites for land to bury their dead ancestors.

From 1873 on, many Russian Mennonites settled the Great Plains on the western frontier of the United States. Mennonites settled land in Indian Territory (now Oklahoma), and in 1880 established missionary work in an attempt to convert inhabitants of the Cheyenne and Arapaho Tribes to Christianity. A decade later, the Mennonite Brethren Church began missionary work in an attempt to convert the Comanche.

Hutterites who settled in western states like South Dakota gained formerly Indigenous land through the Homestead Acts.

The Mennonite Church USA historically supported the Doctrine of Discovery in their theology, but in the 21st century has been working to repudiate the doctrine.

== South America ==
=== Bolivia ===
Mennonite settlers began establishing colonies in Bolivia in the 1950s, primarily in the Santa Cruz Department, with later migration from Mennonite communities in Paraguay and Mexico. The Mennonite population grew from fewer than 200 settlers in the late 1950s to an estimated 150,000 people living in at least 120 colonies by the early 2020s.

=== Paraguay ===
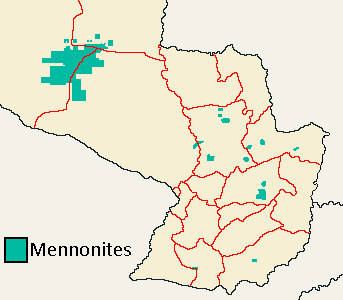
Map of Mennonite colonies in Paraguay

Russian Mennonite settlers first settled Paraguay in the 1920s, fleeing persecution under Stalinism. Mennonites settled land in the Gran Chaco region, which helped the Paraguayan government reassert its territorial claims and displaced Indigenous peoples.

=== Peru ===
During the 2020s, conflicts have occurred between Mennonites in Peru and Indigenous Peruvians. Mennonite settlers have established Mennonite colonies and engaged in deforestation in Peruvian Amazonia, which Indigenous people have alleged is in violation of regulations curtailing deforestation.

=== Suriname ===
Mennonite settlement in Suriname has raised local concerns among Indigenous communities about colonialism and the deforestation of the Amazon rain forest. About 50 Mennonites families, mostly from Bolivia, have settled in Suriname.

== See also ==
- Anabaptist–Jewish relations
- Christian persecution complex
- Black Mennonites
- Decolonization
- Dominion Lands Act
- Martyrs Mirror
- Old Colony Mennonites
- Peace churches
- Surrogate colonialism
- Tatarophobia
- Zionism as settler colonialism
