= Professional Ski Instructors of America & American Association of Snowboard Instructors =

Nonprofit education association involved in ski instruction based in the United States

Professional Ski Instructors of America - American Association of Snowboard Instructors
- Abbreviation: PSIA - AASI
- Formation: 1961
- Type: Nonprofit Educational Organization
- Purpose: Skiing & Snowboarding Education
- Headquarters: Lakewood, Colorado
- Website: thesnowpros.org

The Professional Ski Instructors of America and American Association of Snowboard Instructors (PSIA-AASI) is a nonprofit education association involved in ski instruction. PSIA-AASI establishes certification standards for snowsports instructors and develops education materials.

PSIA-AASI supports instructional programs in alpine skiing, snowboarding, telemark skiing, cross-country skiing, and para-alpine skiing.

PSIA-AASI’s national office is in Lakewood, Colorado, and there are eight regional divisions across the country: Central, Eastern, Intermountain, Northern Intermountain, Northern Rocky Mountain, Northwest, Rocky Mountain, and Western.

== See also ==
- Skiing and skiing topics
- Snowboarding
- National Sports Center for the Disabled
