= Adam Miller (pioneer) =

First permanent white settler in the Shenandoah Valley

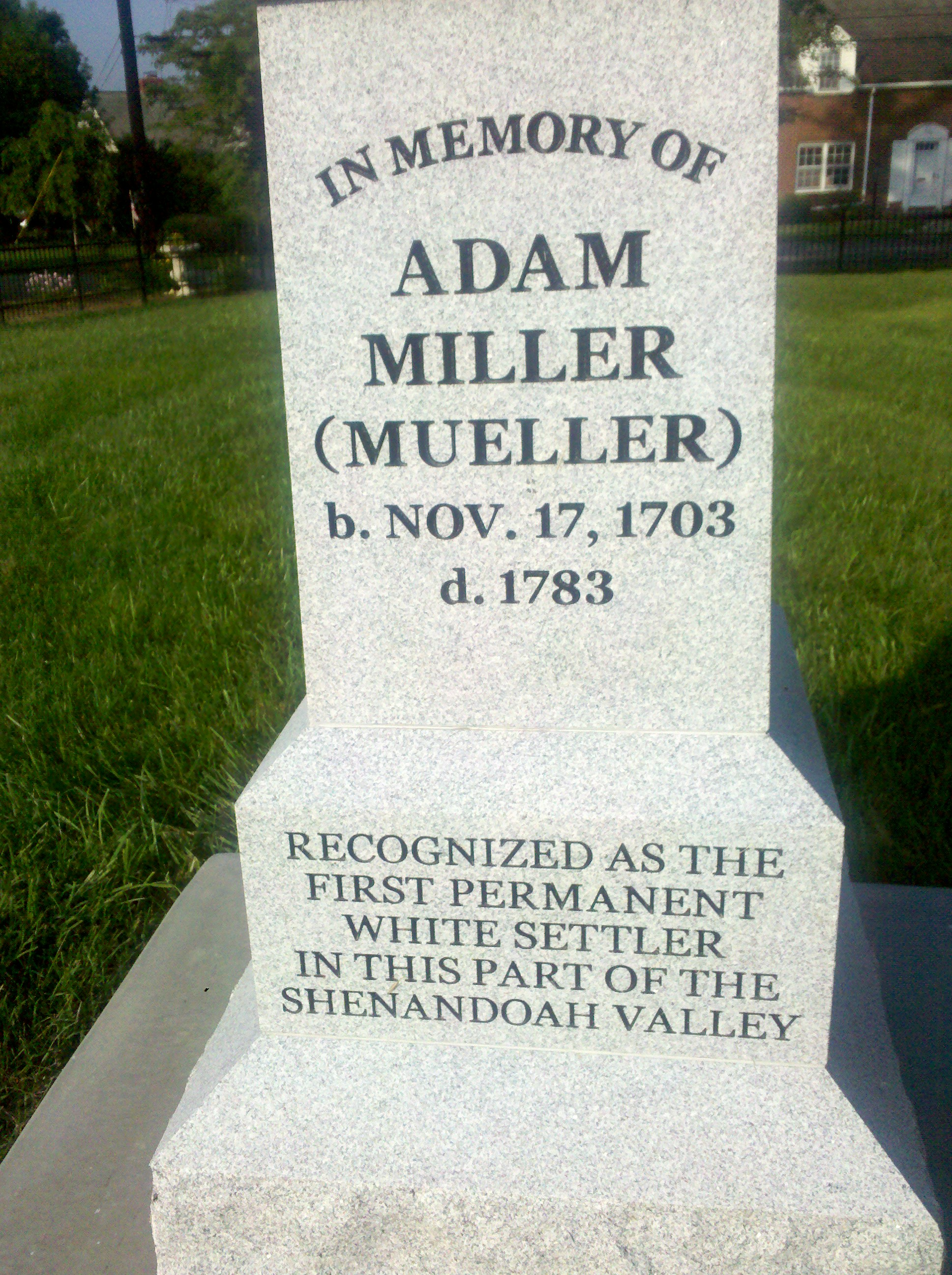
- Adam Miller Monument, Elk Run Cemetery, Elkton, VA

Adam Miller (1703 - 1783) was a German-born American pioneer.

With residency beginning in 1727, Miller (Mueller) is recognized as the first permanent white settler in the Shenandoah Valley of Virginia, US. Born in Schriesheim, Germany (then part of the Holy Roman Empire), Miller immigrated to America as a young married man, settling in Lancaster County, Pennsylvania in 1724.

On a trip through eastern Virginia, Miller heard reports about a lush valley to the west which had been discovered by Governor Alexander Spotswood's legendary Knights of the Golden Horseshoe Expedition. In 1727, Miller and his wife Barbara moved from Pennsylvania to Virginia and staked out a claim on the south fork of the Shenandoah River, near the line that now divides Rockingham County from Page County.

The year of Miller's 1727 arrival in the valley is confirmed in a 1742 naturalization proclamation by Virginia Governor William Gooch, which states, "And Adam Miller ... having Settled and Inhabited for fifteen years past on Shenandoa in this colony". Miller's birthplace is also cited in the proclamation, which notes that he was "born at Shesoin in Germany", but the correct spelling of "Schriesheim" is cited on the reverse side of the original document, written out and signed by Adam Miller.

Shenandoah baptismal records show that Miller and his wife had at least three children: Catarina Elizabetha (b. December 20, 1734), Adam Jr. (b. July 16, 1736) and Anna Christina (b. October 18, 1738). In adulthood, Catarina (Catherine) and Anna married brothers, John Baer and Jacob Baer, respectively.

In 1741, Miller purchased 820 acres (3.3 km^{2}), including a large lithia spring, near Elkton, Virginia, and lived on this property for the remainder of his life. He sold 280 acres (1.1 km^{2}) of this property to his son-in-law, Jacob Baer, and the spring on Miller's land is still known as Bear Lithia Spring. In 1758, Miller fought in the French and Indian War, serving in the Company of Lt. Christian Bingaman. He died in 1783, with his estate settled in Rockingham County, VA.

== See also ==
- Anabaptist settler colonialism
- Shenandoah Germans

== Bibliography ==
- Bakewell, Lois Andis (1992). Andis-Moe Ancestors in America 1741–1990. Laurens, IA: The Compiler.
- Best, Jane Evans (October 1998). "Bear Saga Update:Part Two". Pennsylvania Mennonite Heritage Magazine. 21 (4).
- Hening, William Waller (1820). Hening's Statutes At Large, Vol. VIII. Richmond, VA: Commonwealth of Virginia.
- Kemper, C.E. (July 1902). "Muller (Miller) Adam, First White Settler in the Valley of Virginia". The Virginia Magazine of History and Biography. X (1). The Virginia Historical Society, Richmond, VA.
- Levinson, Constance (1987). Rockingham County Minute Book, 1778–1792 – Part I, 1778–1786. Harrisonburg, VA: Greystone Publishers Co.
- Stoever, Johann Casper (1982). Early Lutheran Baptisms and Marriages in Southeastern Pennsylvania: The Records of John Casper Stoever from 1730 to 1779. Baltimore, MD: Genealogical Publishing Company.
- Strickler, Harry M. (1952). A Short History of Page County Virginia. Richmond, VA: The Dietz Press.
- Wayland, John W. (1912). A History of Rockingham County, Virginia. Dayton, VA: Ruebush-Elkins.
- Wayland, John W. (1943). Men of Mark and Representative Citizens of Harrisonburg and Rockingham County, Virginia. Staunton, VA: The McClure Co.
- Wayland, John W. (1907). The German Element in the Shenandoah Valley. Charlottesville, VA: Michie Company.
- Wayland, John W. (1996). Virginia Valley Records. Baltimore, MD: Clearfield Co.
