= Joseph Funk House =

Historic house in Virginia, United States

- U.S. National Register of Historic Places
- Virginia Landmarks Register
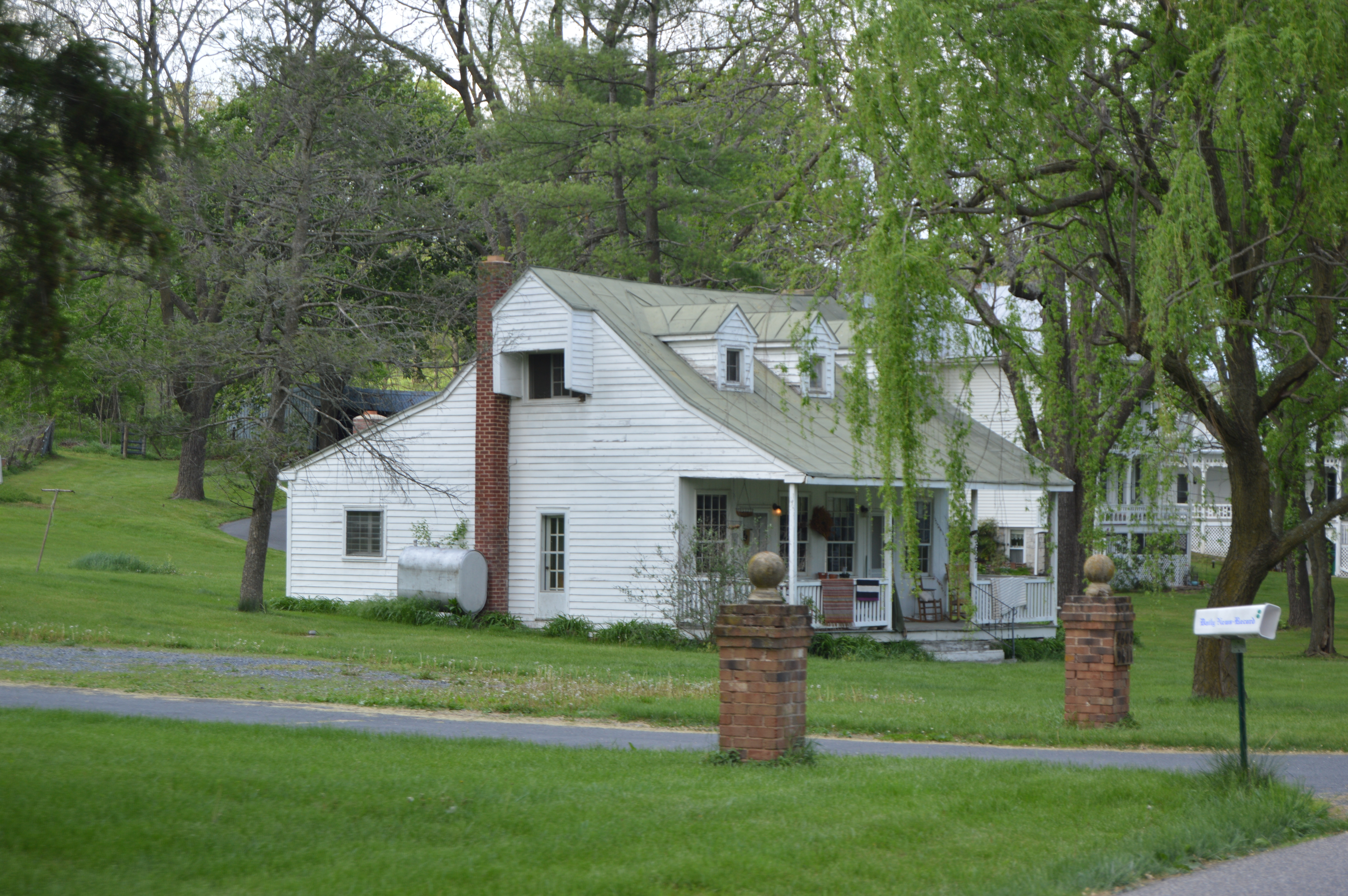
- Southwestern angle

- Location within Virginia Location within the United States
- Location: Singers Glen Road in Singers Glen, Virginia
- Coordinates: 38°33′3″N 78°55′4″W
- Area: Less than 1 acre (0.40 ha)
- Built: c. 1810
- NRHP reference No.: 75002036
- VLR No.: 082-0069

Significant dates
- Added to NRHP: February 24, 1975
- Designated VLR: November 19, 1975

Joseph Funk House is a historic home located at Singers Glen, Rockingham County, Virginia. It was built about 1810, and is a 1 1/2-story, log dwelling with a gable roof and an undercut front gallery. The house is sheathed with weatherboarding. Its builder Joseph Funk (1777-1862), was a leader in the Mennonite faith and an influential musical theorist who was the grandson of a German Palatine settler of Bernese Swiss descent. The second-floor room where the printing press, formerly located in a separate building, was placed was originally a loom room. It was converted to a school room in 1837. The building served as Funk's publishing house from 1847 until 1878.

It was listed on the National Register of Historic Places in 1975.
