= Joseph Funk =

American music teacher, publisher, and composer

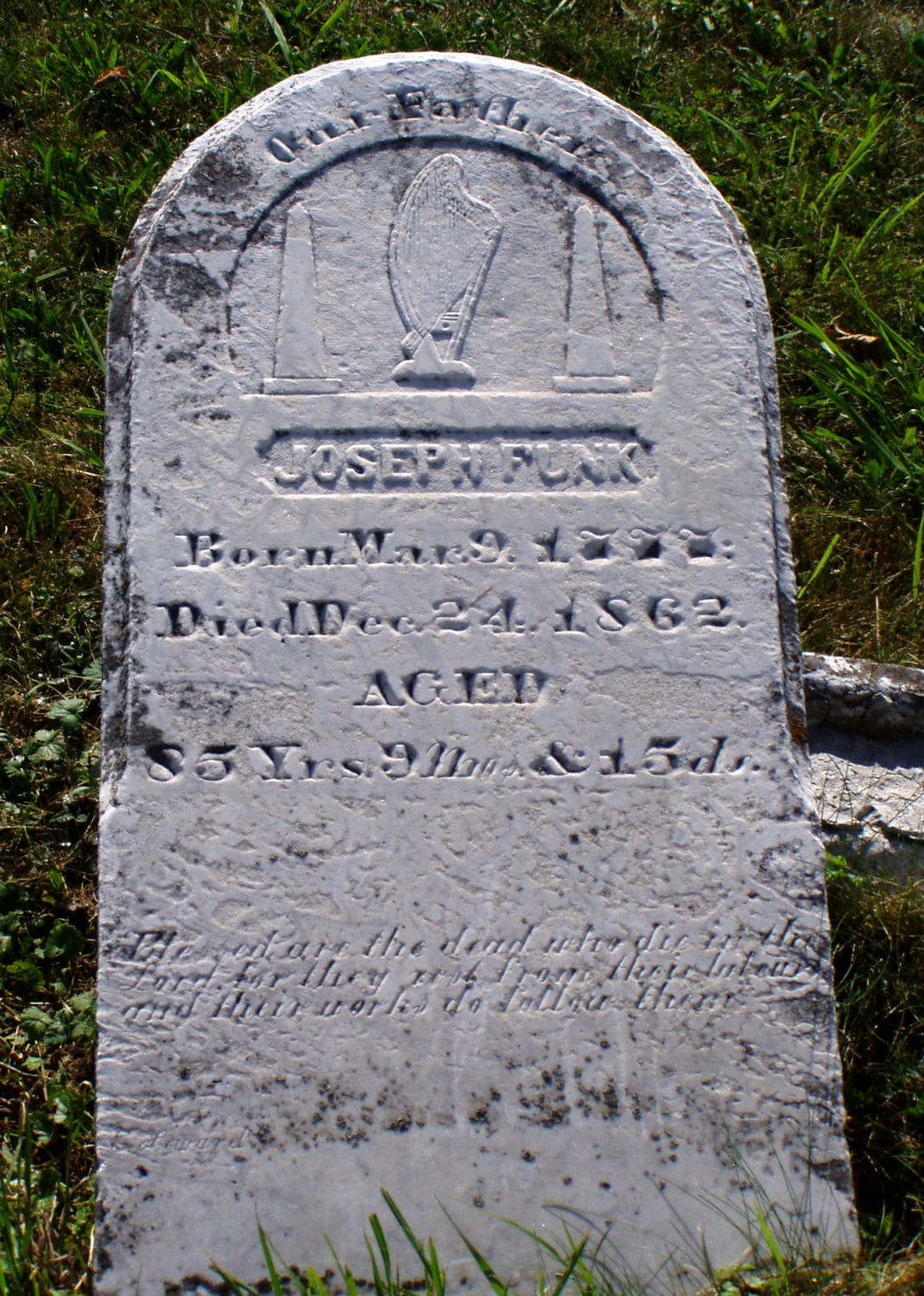
Joseph Funk's tombstone in Singers Glen, Virginia

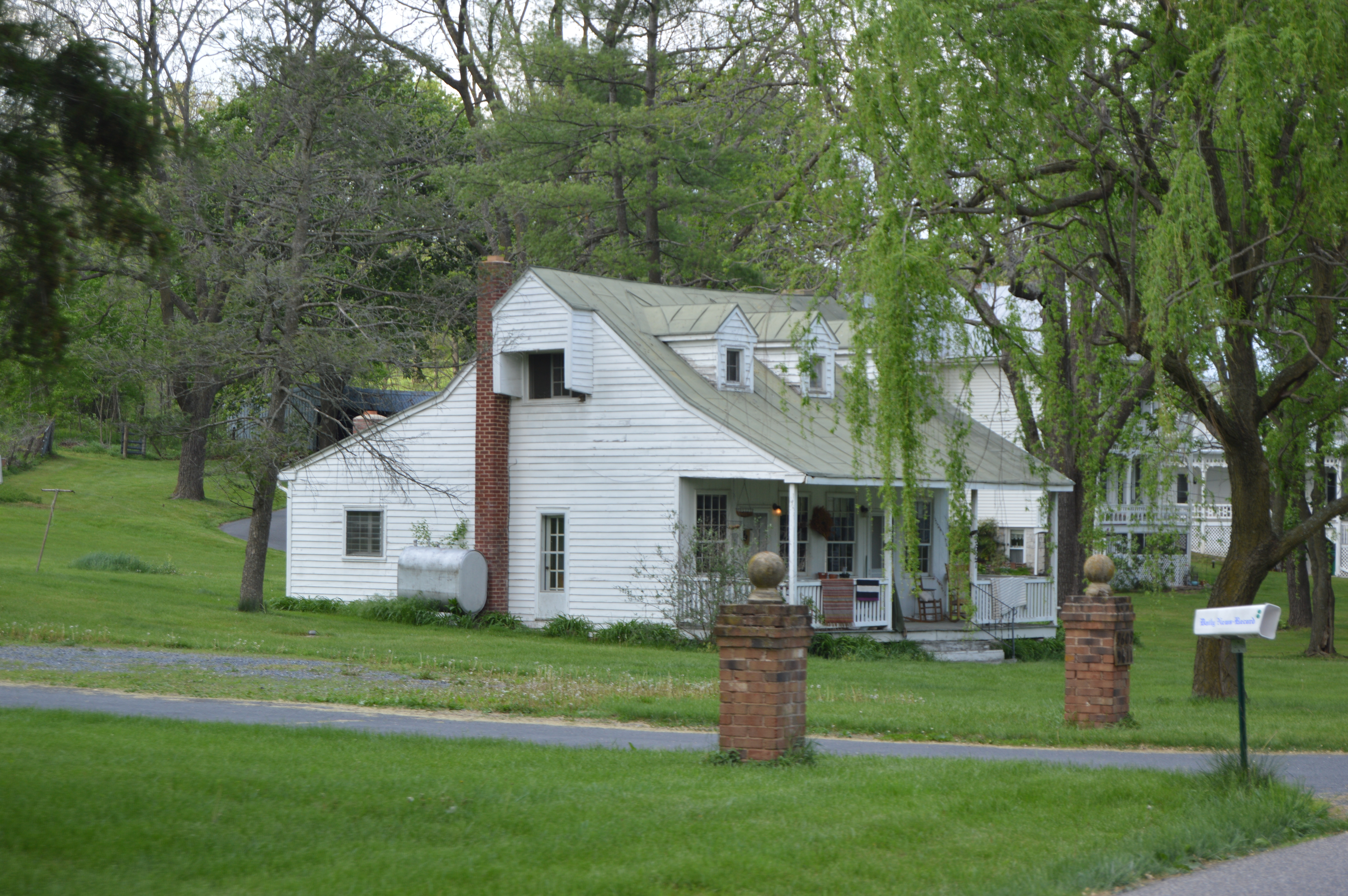
Funk's home in Singers Glen

Joseph Funk (1778–1862) was a pioneer American music teacher, publisher, and an early American composer. He invented a shape note system in 1851 for the Harmonia Sacra.

== Biography ==
Funk was born April 6, 1778 (though his gravestone states March 9, 1777), in Bucks County, Pennsylvania, the son of Henry and Barbara (Showalter) Funk, and a grandson of Bishop Heinrich Funck, a German Palatine settler of Bernese Swiss descent. Bishop Funck came to America in 1719, and was the first Mennonite bishop in America. As a boy, Joseph moved with his parents to Rockingham County, Virginia, and spent the rest of his life there.

In 1804, Funk married Elizabeth Rhodes, and they had five children. After her death, he married Rachel Britton, and they raised nine children.

He was a member of the Mennonite Church. In 1847, he established the first Mennonite printing house in the United States, at Mountain Valley, Virginia (renamed Singers Glen in 1860). Funk and his sons were active in organizing and teaching many singing schools in Virginia.

Funk died December 24, 1862, and is buried in the cemetery at Singers Glen. Funk compiled and published seven books and periodicals:

- Ein allgemein nützliche Choral-Music (1816)
- A Compilation of Genuine Church Music (1832)
- The Confession of Faith (1837)
- A Collection of Psalms, Hymns, and Spiritual Songs (1847)
- The Reviewer Reviewed (1857)
- The Southern Musical Advocate and Singer's Friend
- J. and D. Brenneman, Hymns

The 1847 fourth edition of Funk's A Compilation of Genuine Church Music was the first publication by Joseph Funk and Sons at Singers Glen. The name was changed to Harmonia Sacra in 1851. The book is still is in use by Mennonites today. The Southern Musical Advocate and Singer's Friend was a 16-page monthly periodical published by Funk from 1859 to 1861. It was a forerunner of The Musical Million and Fireside Friend, a periodical published by Funk's grandson, Aldine S. Kieffer. Joseph Funk's sons continued the printing business after his death. The Ruebush-Kieffer Company purchased the press in 1878.

The Joseph Funk House was listed on the National Register of Historic Places in 1975.
