= Dayton, Virginia =

- Town
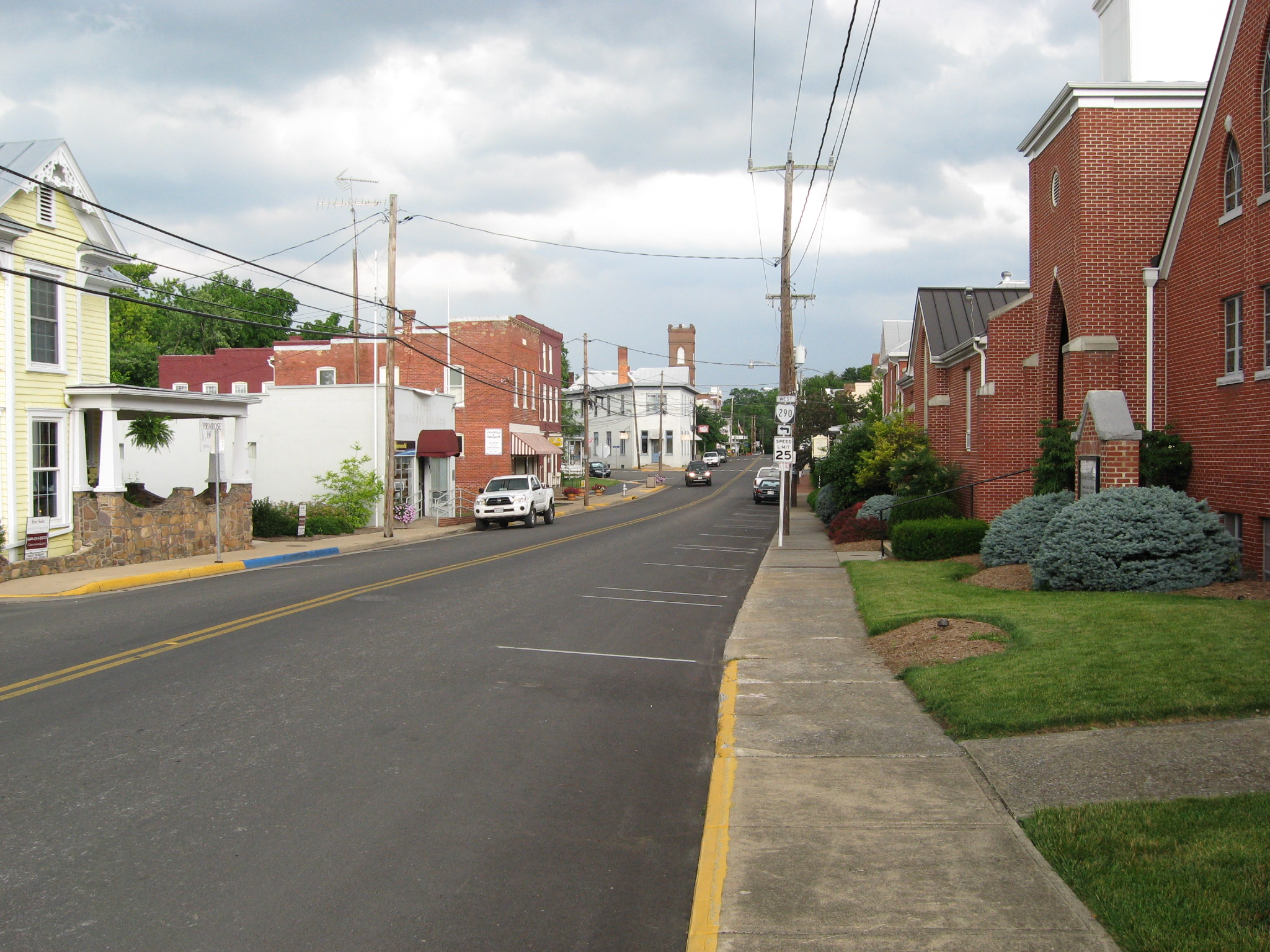
- Main Street, Dayton

- Seal

- Location of Dayton within the Rockingham County

- Location in Virginia Dayton, Virginia (the United States)
- Coordinates: 38°24′59″N 78°56′22″W
- Country: United States
- State: Virginia
- County: Rockingham
- Incorporated: 1879

Government
  - Type: Council-Manager
  - Mayor: Sam Lee
  - Vice Mayor: Bradford Dyjak
  - Town Manager: Brian Borne

Area
  - Total: 1.03 sq mi (2.67 km^{2})
  - Land: 1.03 sq mi (2.67 km^{2})
  - Water: 0 sq mi (0.00 km^{2})
- Elevation: 1,204 ft (367 m)

Population (2020)
  - Total: 1,688
  - Estimate: 1,637
  - Density: 1,587.2/sq mi (612.82/km^{2})
- Time zone: UTC-5 (Eastern (EST))
  - Summer (DST): UTC-4 (EDT)
- ZIP code: 22821
- Area code: 540
- FIPS code: 51-21648
- GNIS feature ID: 1492844
- Website: www.daytonva.us/

Dayton is a town in Rockingham County, Virginia, United States. The population is 1,688 as of the 2020 census. It is included in the Harrisonburg metropolitan area.

== Geography ==
Dayton is located at 38°24′59″N 78°56′22″W (38.416323, -78.939440). The town is approximately two miles southwest of Harrisonburg and two miles northeast of Bridgewater.

According to the United States Census Bureau, the town has a total area of 0.8 square mile (2.1 km^{2}), all land.

== History ==
The town of Dayton is one of the oldest settled communities in Rockingham County, and is the county's second oldest incorporated town, after Bridgewater. The first settler in Dayton was Daniel Harrison (c. 1702–1770), whose family settled along Cooks Creek, north of downtown. Daniel was the eldest son of Isaiah Harrison and second wife Abigail and was born in Oyster Bay, Long Island, New York. Daniel's brother Thomas Harrison founded Harrisonburg several miles to the northeast. They and their three brothers had migrated from New York to Delaware and then to Orange County Virginia before settling in the Shenandoah Valley.

The family homestead, a two-story stone house, has been owned and maintained since 1977 by a private, non-profit organization, Fort Harrison, Inc. The town was known as Rifeville or Rifetown until 1833.

Shenandoah University has its roots in Dayton, when it was known as the Shenandoah College and Conservatory of Music. The college was organized in 1875 under the leadership of Rev. A.P. Funkhouser. This was a major institution in Dayton until 1960, when it moved to Winchester. College Street was named after the school and many of the street's buildings served as part of the campus.

The Dayton Historic District, Daniel Harrison House, and Peter Paul House are listed on the National Register of Historic Places.

In 2018, a series of strikes and protests were held at the town's Cargill plant.

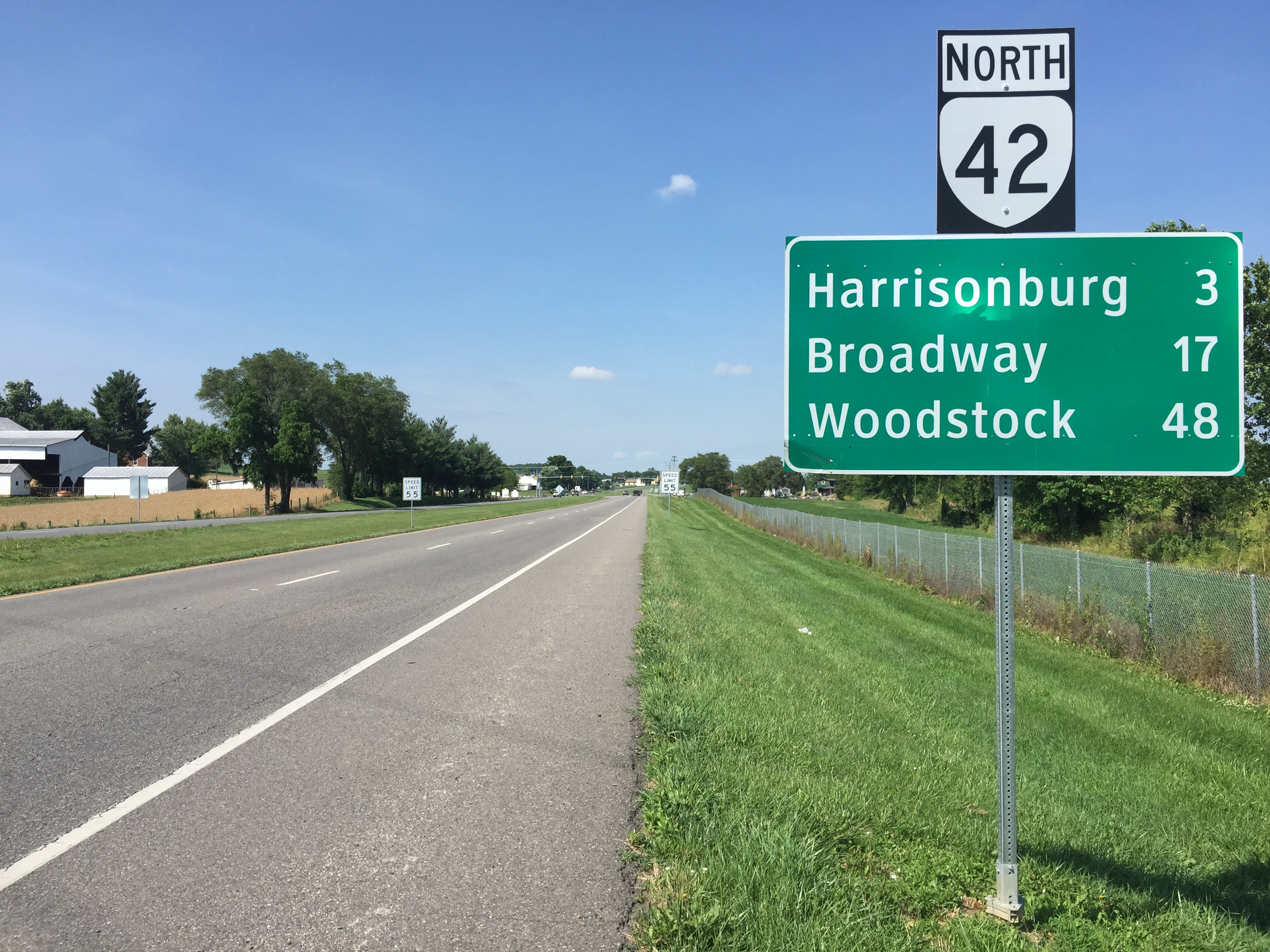
SR 42, the largest and busiest road in Dayton

== Transportation ==
Primary road access to Dayton is provided by Virginia State Route 42, which runs southwest to Bridgewater and northeast to Harrisonburg, where it connects with U.S. Route 33. Virginia State Route 257 also serves Dayton. SR 257 runs concurrently with SR 42 from Dayton southwest to Bridgewater, but heads westward from Dayton into the rural areas of southwestern Rockingham County. Virginia State Route 42 Business and Virginia State Route 290 also serve as primary roadways within Dayton.

== Demographics ==
Historical population
Census	Pop.	Note	%±
1880	258		—
1900	425		—
1910	516		21.4%
1920	482		−6.6%
1930	537		11.4%
1940	632		17.7%
1950	788		24.7%
1960	930		18.0%
1970	978		5.2%
1980	1,017		4.0%
1990	921		−9.4%
2000	1,344		45.9%
2010	1,530		13.8%
2020	1,688		10.3%
U.S. Decennial Census

=== 2020 census ===
As of the 2020 census, Dayton had a population of 1,688. The median age was 39.4 years. 23.1% of residents were under the age of 18 and 17.1% of residents were 65 years of age or older. For every 100 females there were 91.8 males, and for every 100 females age 18 and over there were 90.3 males age 18 and over.

98.3% of residents lived in urban areas, while 1.7% lived in rural areas.

There were 667 households in Dayton, of which 31.9% had children under the age of 18 living in them. Of all households, 57.0% were married-couple households, 14.7% were households with a male householder and no spouse or partner present, and 21.1% were households with a female householder and no spouse or partner present. About 22.3% of all households were made up of individuals and 11.3% had someone living alone who was 65 years of age or older.

There were 694 housing units, of which 3.9% were vacant. The homeowner vacancy rate was 0.4% and the rental vacancy rate was 6.2%.

Racial composition as of the 2020 census
Race	Number	Percent
White	1,366	80.9%
Black or African American	27	1.6%
American Indian and Alaska Native	9	0.5%
Asian	28	1.7%
Native Hawaiian and Other Pacific Islander	0	0.0%
Some other race	117	6.9%
Two or more races	141	8.4%
Hispanic or Latino (of any race)	227	13.4%

=== 2000 census ===
As of the census of 2000, 1,344 people, 542 households, and 383 families resided in the town. The population density was 1,657.2 people per square mile (640.6/km^{2}). There were 565 housing units at an average density of 696.6 per square mile (269.3/km^{2}). The racial makeup of the town was 94.20% White, 0.67% African American, 0.37% Asian, 2.90% from other races, and 1.86% from two or more races. Hispanic or Latino of any race were 6.62% of the population.

Of 542 households, 31.5% had children under the age of 18 living with them, 57.6% were married couples living together, 7.7% had a female householder with no husband present, and 29.2% were not families. About 24.9% of all households were made up of individuals, and 9.8% had someone living alone who was 65 years of age or older. The average household size was 2.48 and the average family size was 2.97.

In the town, the population was distributed as 24.1% under the age of 18, 6.8% from 18 to 24, 33.6% from 25 to 44, 19.9% from 45 to 64, and 15.6% who were 65 years of age or older. The median age was 37 years. For every 100 females, there were 98.2 males. For every 100 females age 18 and over, there were 96.5 males.

The median income for a household in the town was $35,958, and the median income for a family was $44,732. Males had a median income of $30,109 versus $23,906 for females. The per capita income for the town was $17,600. About 3.5% of families and 8.1% of the population were below the poverty line, including 9.7% of those under age 18 and 7.5% of those age 65 or over.

=== Old Order Mennonites ===
There are two different groups of Old Order Mennonites who live around Dayton: members of the Virginia Old Order Mennonite Conference and of the John Dan Wenger Mennonites. The latter are the more conservative ones. The two groups separated from each other in 1952/3. The total population of these two groups in the area is around 1,000 people.

== Climate ==
The climate in this area is characterized by hot, humid summers and generally mild to cool winters. According to the Köppen Climate Classification system, Dayton has a humid subtropical climate, abbreviated "Cfa" on climate maps.

== In popular culture ==
The city is a setting in the music video for "Cheer Up" by the Korean pop group Twice. The video depicts Chaeyoung performing outside (on a set) with a Dayton town sign, while dressed as a cowgirl.
