= Singers Glen, Virginia =

Singers Glen
- Census-designated place
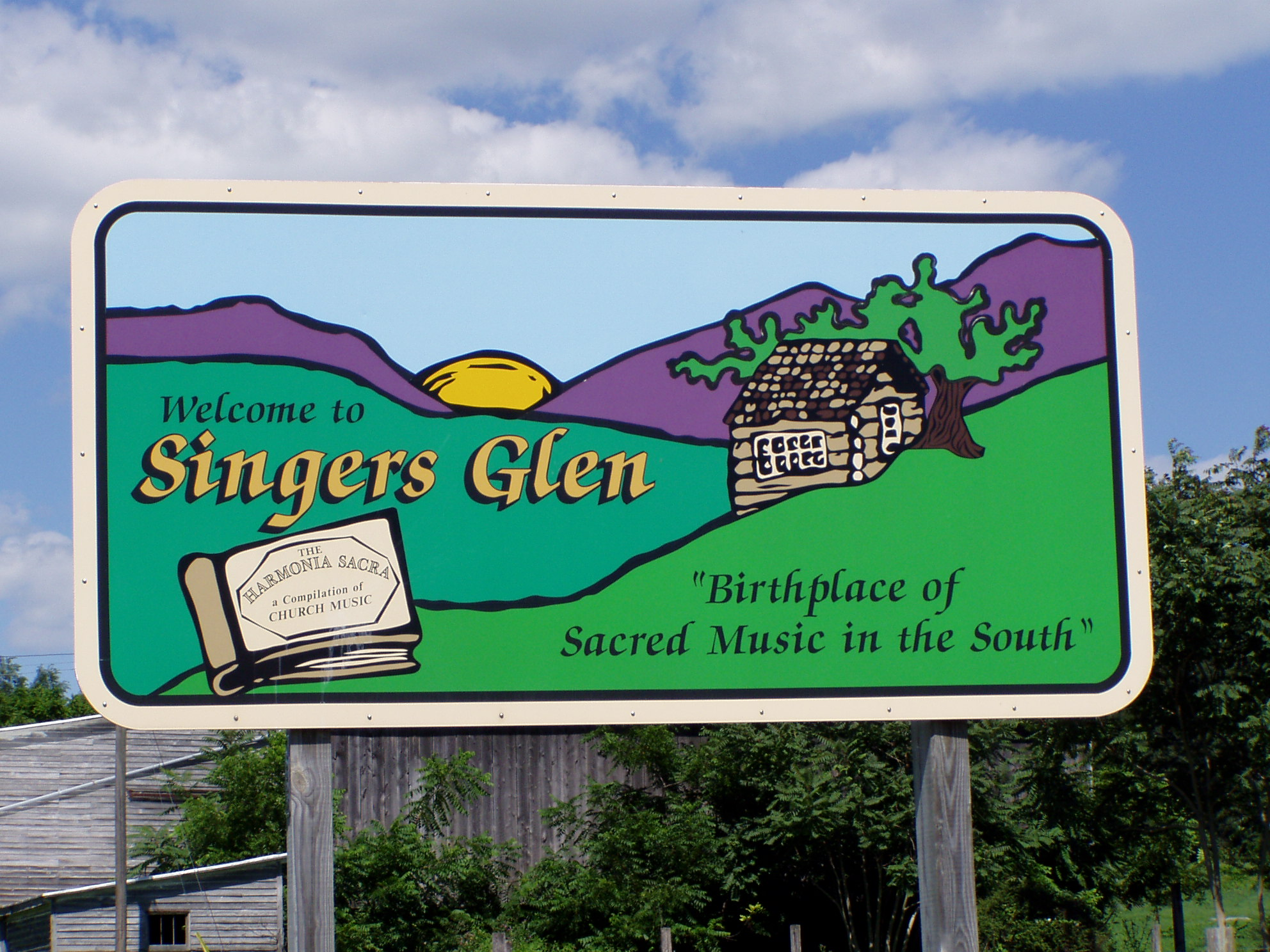
- Singers Glen welcome sign
- Nickname: "Birthplace of Sacred Music in the South"
- Location of the Singers Glen CDP within the Rockingham County

- Location in Virginia Singers Glen (the United States)
- Coordinates: 38°33′0″N 78°54′51″W
- Country: United States
- State: Virginia
- County: Rockingham
- Elevation: 500 m (1,600 ft)
- FIPS code: 51-72736
- GNIS feature ID: 2807442

Singers Glen is a census-designated place (CDP) located in Rockingham County, Virginia, United States, and situated between Little North Mountain and Interstate 81. Singers Glen is a historic settlement that is registered by both the Virginia Historic Landmarks Commission and the United States Department of the Interior. The community comprises one road (Singers Glen Road), the Singers Glen Post Office, a recycling center, the Singers Glen School, the Singers Glen Volunteer Fire Company, Singers Glen volunteer rescue squad, one store, and a Methodist and Baptist Church. It is listed as a CDP for the United States Census 2020. As of the 2020 census, Singers Glen had a population of 195.

== History ==
Singers Glen was first settled in 1809 by Joseph Funk and other descendants of the German Anabaptists who had been persecuted during the European Wars of Religion. Funk was a well known music teacher and composer, and thanks largely to him, Singers Glen is sometimes considered the birthplace of gospel music in the American South.

The Joseph Funk House and Singers Glen Historic District are listed on the National Register of Historic Places.

== Education ==
Singers Glen School operated from 1882 to 1973.

== Emergency services ==
Singers Glen Volunteer Fire Company, serves 32 square miles (83 km^{2}) and at least 2,500 residents.

== Religion ==
Singers Glen Cemetery overlooks the town from atop a hill. Access is available from Turleytown Road.

Singers Glen has more churches than commercial establishments. The churches in the Singers Glen area are Donovan Memorial United Methodist, Morning View Mennonite Church, Singers Glen Baptist Church, and Zion Hill Mennonite Church

== Demographics ==
Singers Glen first appeared as a census designated place in the 2020 U.S. census.

== Prominent residents and places ==
- Glen Farm has occupied the same location for more than two centuries.
- Joseph Funk founded the first Mennonite printing house in the United States here in 1847, best known for printing the Harmonia Sacra.
