= Linville Creek =

- Location of Linville Creek in Virginia Linville Creek (the United States)

Location
- Country: United States
- State: Virginia
- County: Rockingham County

Physical characteristics
- Mouth: North Fork Shenandoah River
  - location: near Broadway, Rockingham County, Virginia
  - coordinates: 38°37′12″N 78°47′38″W
- Basin size: 45.7 sq mi (118 km2)
- Discharge
  - location: Broadway, Virginia

Basin features
- Progression: North Fork Shenandoah River → Shenandoah River → Potomac River → Chesapeake Bay → Atlantic Ocean
- River system: Potomac River watershed

Linville Creek is a stream in Rockingham County, Virginia that flows into the North Fork of the Shenandoah River. The creek has a significant burial mound on its banks that was used over hundreds of years (the Linville Mound) and the creek's waters were harnessed by multiple mills, including Breneman-Turner Mill, Wengers Mill, and Edom Mill.

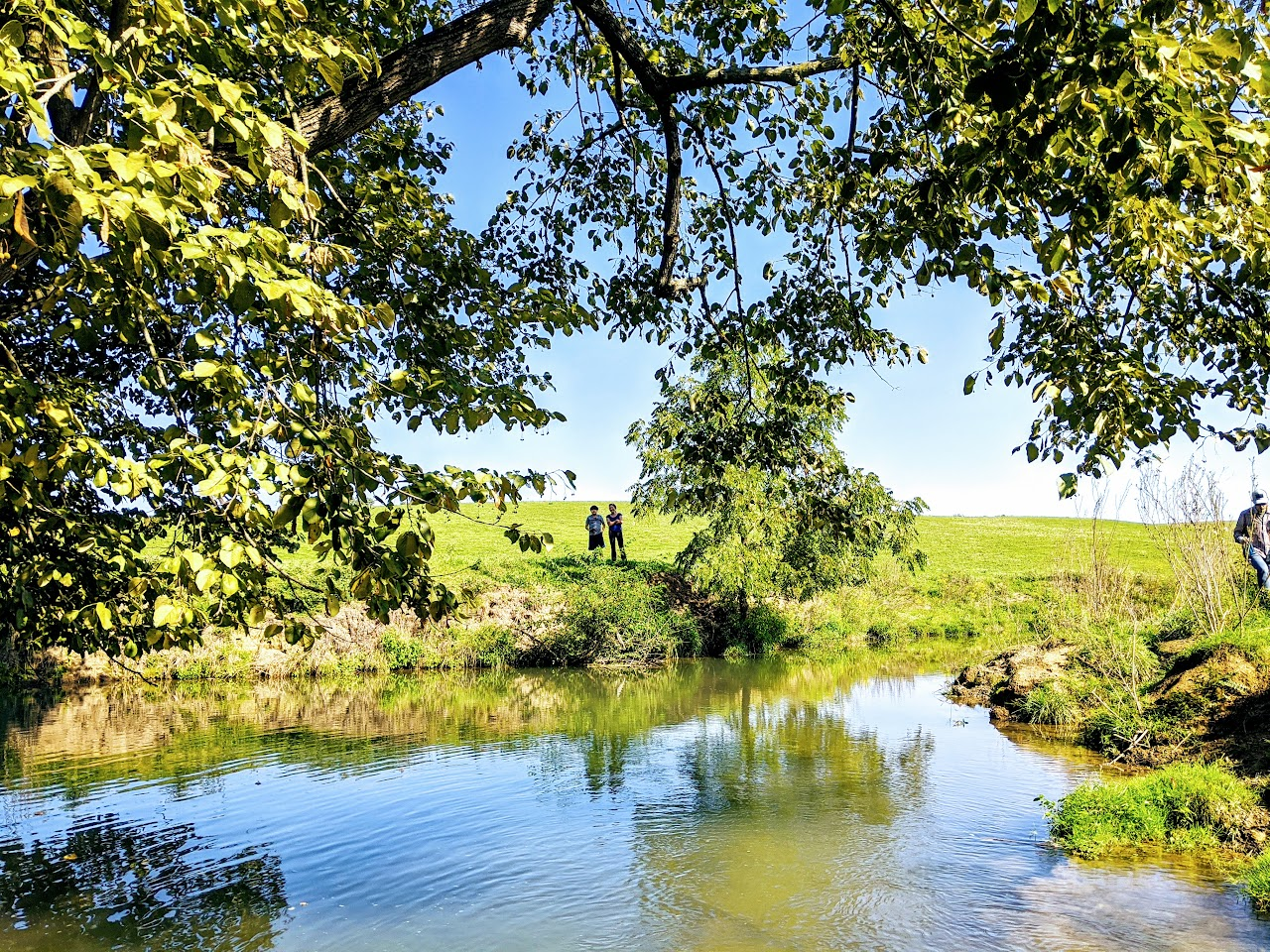
Linden tree over the swimming hole at Hacksaw Bend in Linville Creek, Rockingham County, Virginia

== History ==
Early residents of Linville Creek were of the Albemarle tradition, a culture that spanned the Blue Ridge Mountains from about 700 to 1300 CE. Albemarle communities were often linear, with settlements of five to seven houses along waterways. Five settlements have been documented along Linville Creek to date. The Linville Mound, on the floodplain of Linville Creek, was used as a burial site for hundreds of years.

In the 1700s, settlers of European origin began calling the creek Linville ("Linwell's") Creek after William Linwell (Linville), who bought 1500 acres.

In March 1739, Jost Hite, Robert McKay, William Duff, and Robert Green had a survey of 7009 acres along Linville Creek conducted, from the site of Broadway up the creek valley around eight miles. 21 corners and 21 courses were covered in the survey. At every one of the 21 corners trees are mentioned: 32 white oaks, 4 black oaks, 2 hickories, 5 pines, 1 red oak, and 1 walnut.

Around 1750, Daniel Boone's family lived by Linville Creek for a year or so, and this is where Boone went on his first long hunt, with his friend Henry Miller. The two young men took the hides and pelts from their hunt and sold them in Philadelphia, where they immediately spent all the money they had earned. The family of Abraham Lincoln also lived in the area, and built the Lincoln Homestead and Cemetery on Linville creek.

George Washington crossed Linville Creek in 1784, following the road across the valley from Brock's Gap to Port Republic.

The first Caesarean section performed by an American medical doctor happened in 1794 in Edom, Virginia, on Linville Creek.

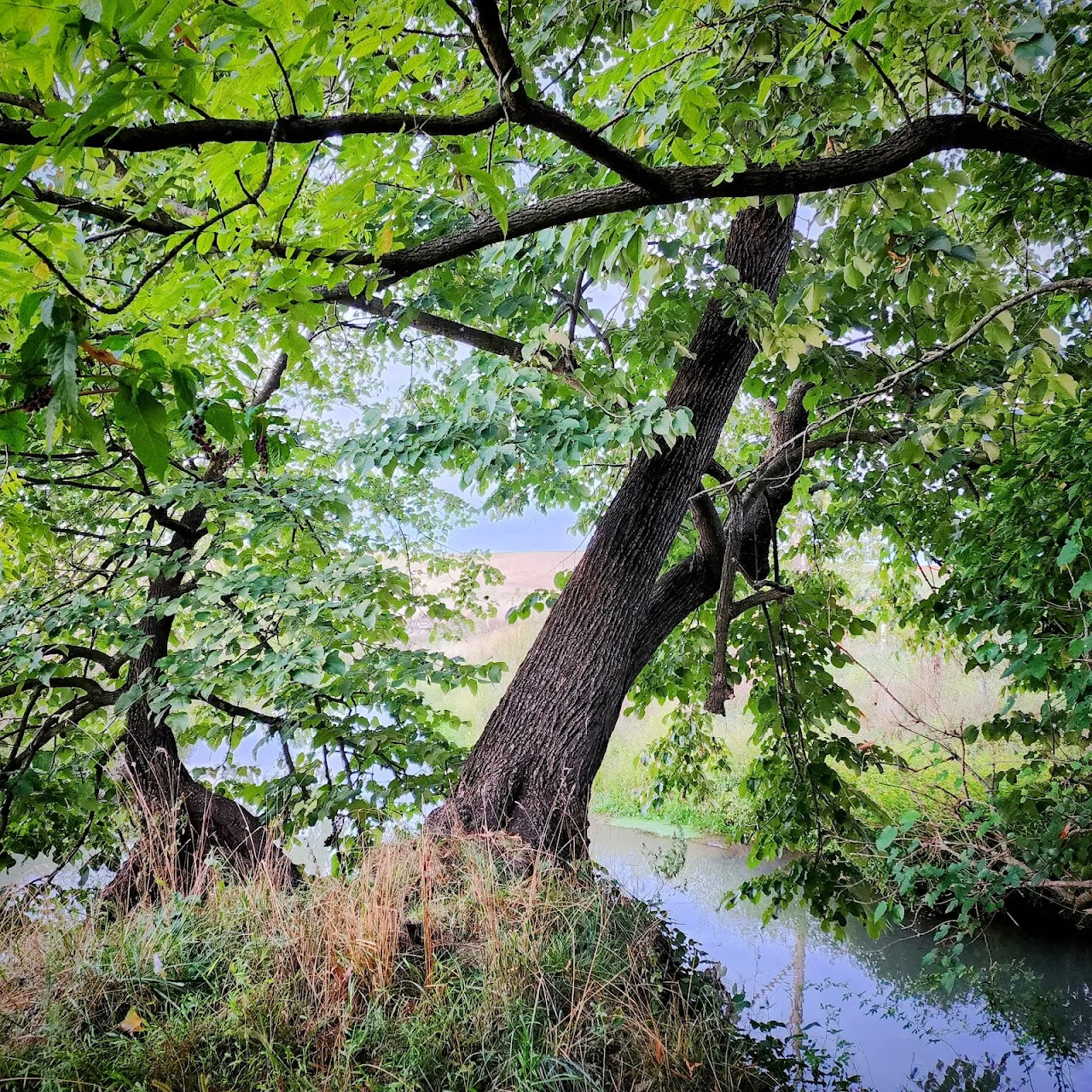
Linden over a swimming hole on Linville Creek

The following historic sites are along Linville Creek:

- John K. Beery Farm (along the Buttermilk Creek tributary)
- Edom Store and Post Office
- Edom, Virginia
- Breneman-Turner Mill (along the West Fork tributary)
- George Chrisman House (along the Joes Creek tributary)
- Mannheim
- Baxter House
- Linville Mound
- Lincoln Homestead and Cemetery
- Sites House

A number of people who lived along Linville Creek have Wikipedia entries, including

- John Acker (Virginia politician)
- Jesse Bennett
- Daniel Boone
- George Bowman (pioneer)
- Jacob Bowman
- Morgan Bryan
- John Kline (elder)
- Abraham Lincoln (captain)
- Thomas Lincoln

== Natural history ==
Wildlife in the Linville Creek watershed include animals of conservation significance. Aquatic ones include the rare brook floater mussel, the fragile green floater mussel, the American water shrew, the wood turtle, and the American eel. Cave creatures include the Madison Cave isopod, the cave pseudoscorpion Chitrella superba, and the Virginia big-eared bat.

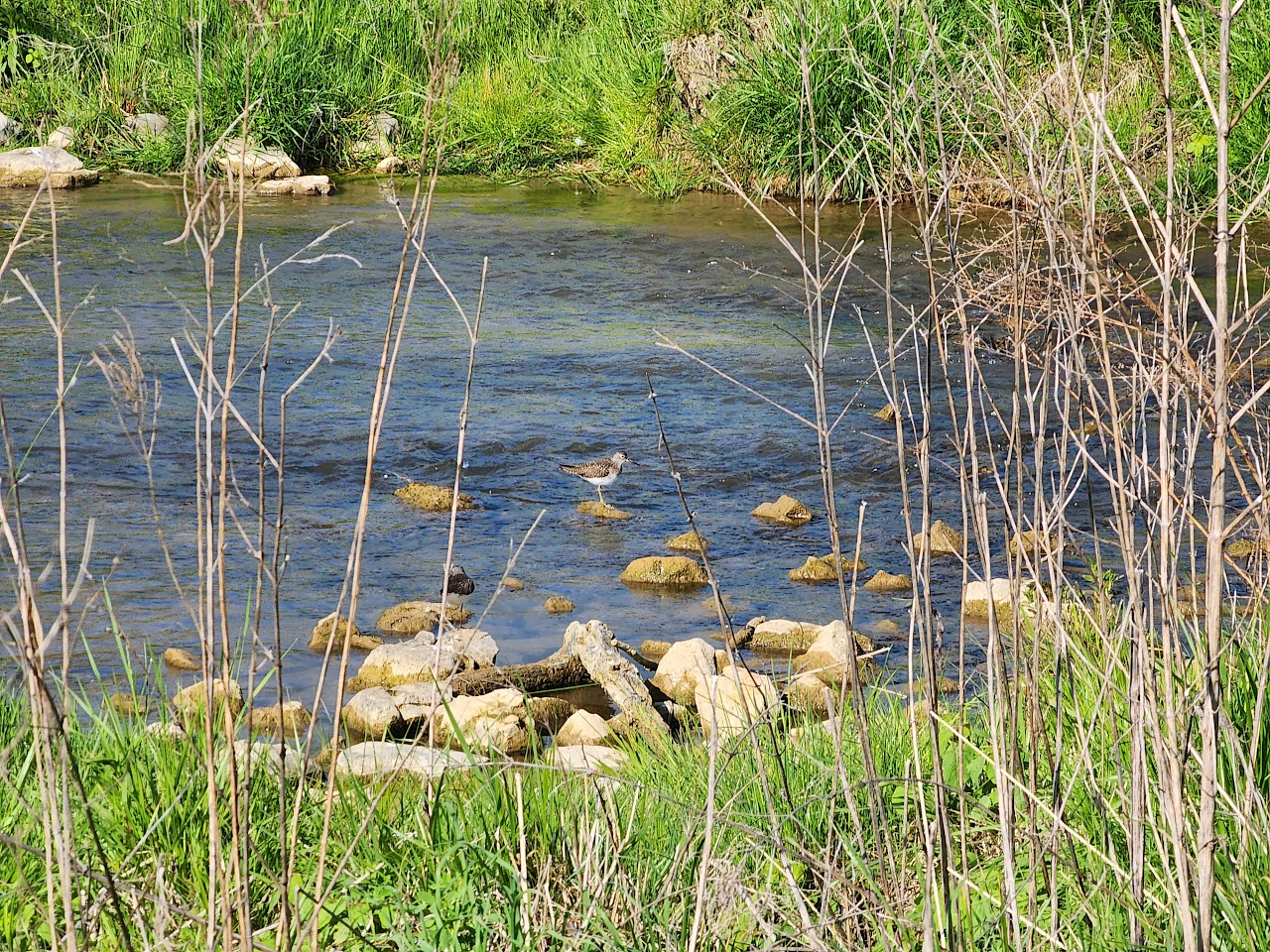
A sandpiper hunts the shoals of Linville Creek.

Species in the watershed that face an extremely high risk of extinction include the Indiana bat (Myotis sodalis), the Northern long-eared bat (Myotis septentrionalis), the Virginia big-eared bat (Corynorhinus townsendii virginianus), the rusty patched bumble bee (Bombus affinis), the little brown bat (Myotis lucifugus), the wood turtle (Glyptemys insculpta), the peregrine falcon (Falco peregrinus), the loggerhead shrike (Lanius ludovicianus), the regal fritillary (Speyeria idalia idalia), the Cow Knob salamander (Plethodon punctatus), the American barn owl (Tyto furcata), the vesper sparrow (Pooecetes gramineus), the golden-winged warbler (Vermivora chrysoptera), the American woodcock (Scolopax minor), the Brook floater (Alasmidonta varicosa), the common nighthawk (Chordeiles minor), and the Canada warbler (Cardellina canadensis).

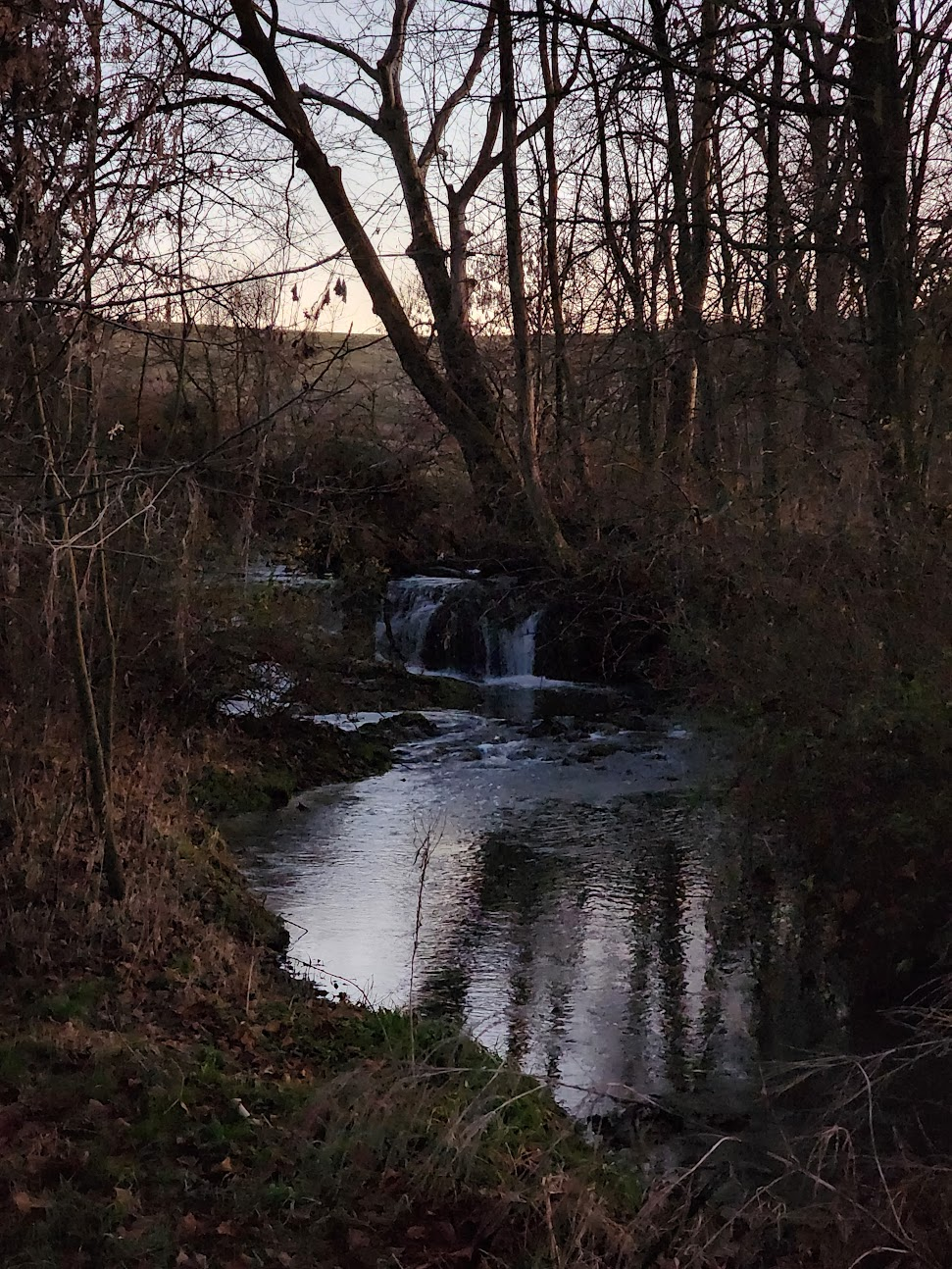
The falls on Linville Creek downstream of Breneman-Turner Mill

== Geology ==
The Linville Creek watershed is in the central Shenandoah Valley, a karst landscape with sinkholes, caves, springs, sinking streams, and underground conduits.

== Tributaries ==
(In order from upstream to downstream)

- Buttermilk Creek
- West Fork
- Joes Creek
- Tide Spring Branch
- Daphna Creek

== Features ==
Upstream of Breneman-Turner Mill the creek used to be diverted into a mill pond. Downstream of Breneman-Turner Mill the creek passes over a waterfall. A bioreactor (to absorb nitrate pollution) is located on a spring at Linville Creek. In the town of Broadway the creek passes under the Linville Creek Bridge, a historic single-span bridge.

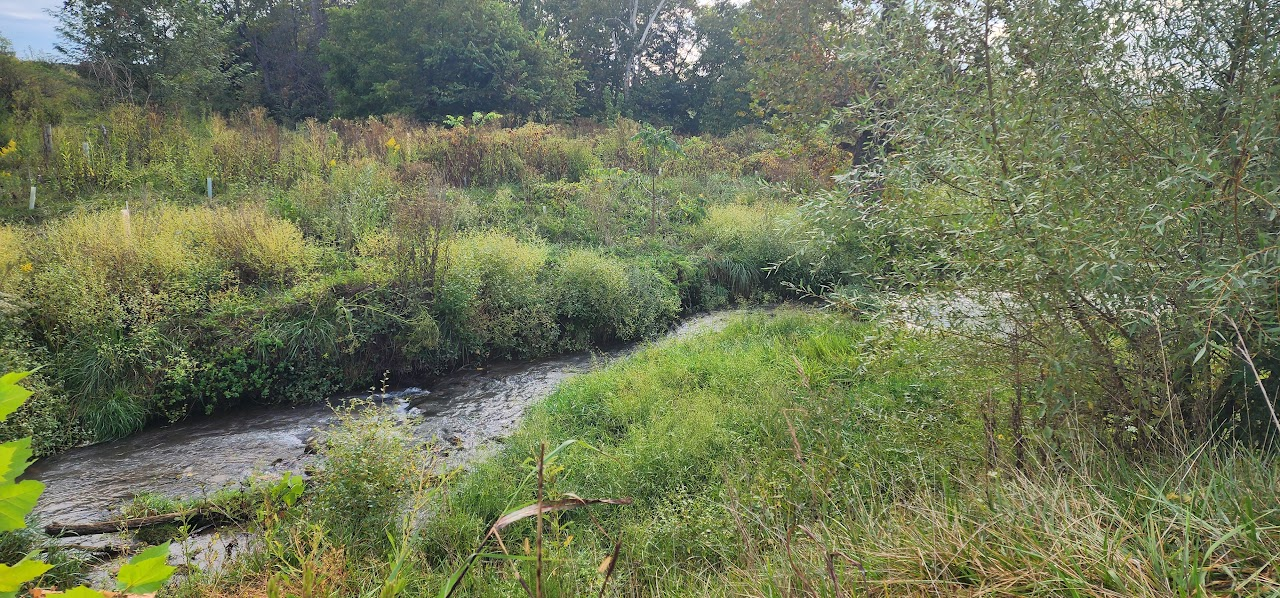
Linville streambank tree and wildflower planting

== Economy ==
Many mills have been built on Linville Creek, including Edom Mill, Wengers Mill, and the grist mill Breneman-Turner Mill.

== Mentions ==
John Walter Wayland's 1924 Historic Landmarks of the Shenandoah Valley describes Linville Creek in nostalgic terms:

Adown sweet Linville's vale today
Careless I wandered on my way
Forgetful of the past

— John Walter Wayland, Historic Landmarks of the Shenandoah Valley
