= Linville, Virginia =

Linville
- Census-designated place
- Location of the Linville CDP within the Rockingham County

- Location in Virginia Linville (the United States)
- Coordinates: 38°31′15″N 78°50′15″W
- Country: United States
- State: Virginia
- County: Rockingham

Area
  - Total: 0.57 sq mi (1.48 km^{2})

Population (1870)
  - Total: 3,547
- FIPS code: 51-45960

Linville is a census-designated place located in Rockingham County, in the U.S. state of Virginia. It is located six miles north of Harrisonburg. As of the 2020 census, Linville had a population of 355. It is for the first time listed as CDP for the United States Census 2020. It contains the Linville United Church of Christ.

== History ==
The new town of Linville was announced in the January 24, 1867 edition of the Rockingham Register by G.W. Berlin:

The Land is good, and the place is located in the charming valley of Linvill's Creek, and for that reason the new town is called

LINVILLE,

which will be a depot on the Manassas Gap Railroad, file miles North of Harrisonburg.

Berlin also noted three "large never-failing Springs of water in the town" and characterized it as a "rich, beautiful, healthy, populous and productive region of the Valley of Virginia", inviting prospective inhabitants to see a plat in his office in Harrisonburg.

Linville Creek was one of the most important centers of Colonial Virginia during the eighteenth century. Its name is derived from William Linvell (various spellings: Linvel, Linwell), who was granted 15,000 acres in the area prior to 1739. Located along the Great Wagon Road in the Shenandoah Valley of Virginia, Linville Creek quickly became an inhabited civilized outpost on the frontier. Its earliest settlers were English Quakers, and few Scotch-Irish who were later joined by Swiss Germans many of whom moved south from Pennsylvania.

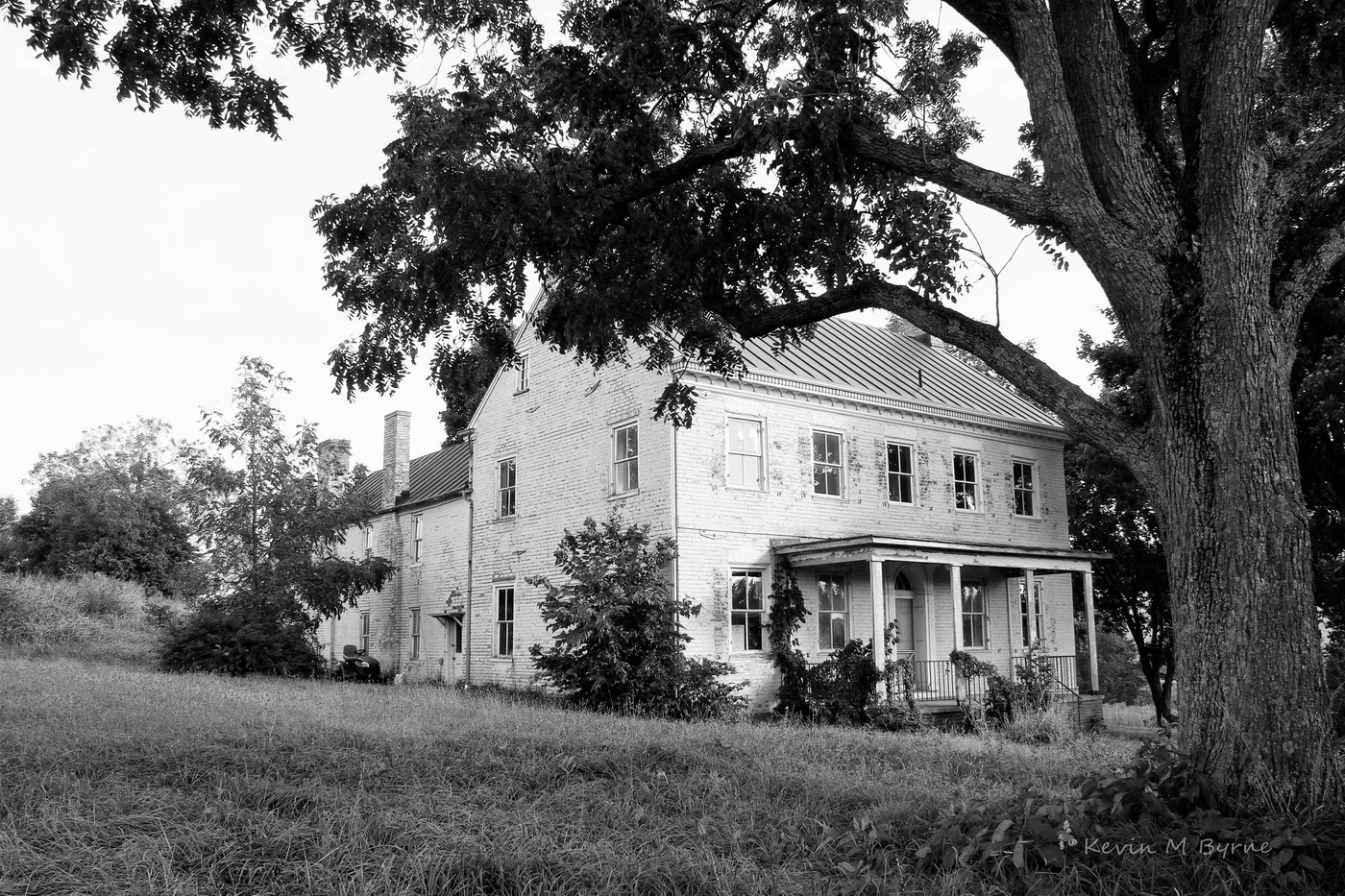
Homestead in Linville in which Thomas Lincoln, father of President Abraham Lincoln, was born in 1778.

Around 1750 Daniel Boone’s father Squire Boone moved his family from Oley, Pennsylvania to the Shenandoah Valley of Virginia. The Boone family farmed in the Linville Creek area for several years in the 1750s before moving on to North Carolina. On August 14, 1756, Daniel Boone married Rebecca Ann Bryan, daughter of Morgan Bryan of Linville Creek, whom he met while living in the Linville area. Boone’s wife and children stayed in the Linville area while he explored the wilderness west of the Allegheny Mountains.

President Abraham Lincoln's great-grandparents, "Virginia John" and Rebecca Flowers Lincoln also moved from Pennsylvania to Virginia in 1768 and settled on a 600-acre tract of land along Linville Creek. The President's father, Thomas Lincoln, was born on this property in 1778 before his family moved west to what is now Kentucky, which was then part of Virginia but across the mountains from areas settled by Europeans. The two-story brick home on the property known as the Lincoln Homestead and Cemetery was built around 1800 by the President's great-uncle Jacob Lincoln. The property, a registered Virginia Historic Landmark, includes a family cemetery where five generations of Lincolns are buried along with two people they had enslaved, named Queenie and Uncle Ned.

During the antebellum period, Linville was an important stop on the Underground Railroad due to the large number of Anabaptists in the area who were opposed to slavery and helped runaway slaves find safe passage out of Rockingham through Brock's Gap to Pendleton for a walk through Franklin and on to Petersburg in what is now West Virginia where they could find rail passage to the north.

Linville was affected by the major local floods of 1870. Its population at the time was 3547, with 17 "productive industries" in the town.

Mannheim and the George Chrisman House are listed on the National Register of Historic Places.

== Demographics ==
Linville first appeared as a census designated place in the 2020 U.S. census.

== Archaeology ==
Northwest of Linville by two miles sits Linville Mound (also referred to as Bowman Mound), a burial site built on the floodplain of Linville Creek.
