= Tide Spring =

- Syphon Fountains
- Interactive map of Tide Spring
- Coordinates: 38°34′38″N 78°51′20″W
- Spring source: Karst spring in Ordovician Beekmantown Group carbonates
- Type: Rhythmic spring
- Frequency: about 63 seconds between surges
- Temperature: generally 13–14 °C

Tide Spring is located 3.5 miles north of Edom, Virginia. Water flows at intervals, and this ebbing and flowing gives it its name. The waters of Tide Spring flow into Linville Creek.

== History ==
Tide Spring was known as Syphon Fountains in 1748.

Thomas Jefferson visited the spring, describing a "syphon fountain" near "the intersection of Lord Fairfax's boundary with the North Mountain, not far from Brock's Gap". At that time, a grist mill on its stream ground two bushels of grain with each surge of the spring.

== Geology ==
Tide Spring is a rhythmic spring near Linville, Virginia, in Rockingham County, Virginia. It is a karst spring in the central Shenandoah Valley noted for periodic discharge behavior. The frequency of the surges in the spring is not constant, but has been measured to be around sixty-three seconds.

Tide Spring is located in the upper part of the Ordovician-age Beekmantown Group carbonates on the west limb of the Broadway syncline. Bedrock exposed near the spring is primarily dolomite. There is a small swarm of diabase dikes southeast of the spring, and one dike may extend as far as Tide Spring and intersect the vicinity of Showalter Spring to the northeast.

The spring's water temperature, monitored from September 2010 to September 2011, was generally between 13 and 14°C. The weak seasonal pattern in the temperature record is evidence that the spring is fed either by relatively shallow groundwater or by a mixture of near-surface and deeper groundwater sources.
