= Lewis Creek Mound =

Native American burial mound in Augusta County, Virginia

Coordinates: 38.1742°N 78.9902°W

Lewis Creek Mound (site designation 44AU20) is a burial mound in Augusta County, Virginia, near present-day Verona, Virginia, on the south bank of Lewis Creek near what is now Indian Mound Road. Between 1000 and 1500 CE, around 900 people were interred here. It is one of a number of documented earthen burial mounds in Virginia.

== Description ==
Lewis Creek Mound is situated on a wide bottomland near Lewis Creek. By the time it was described in the mid-20th century, it measured 42 feet in diameter and 12 to 18 inches high, indicating that it had already been heavily reduced by cultivation and other disturbance. Pre-disturbance, it is estimated to have been around 16 feet high.

Like other Late Woodland burial mounds in Virginia, Lewis Creek Mound was built up over time through repeated interments and additions of earth. This mound tradition is linked to ancestral Monacan communities.

== Disturbance ==
Lewis Creek Mound was damaged over many years by farming, looting, and road construction. By the early 20th century a farmer had repeatedly scraped soil from the mound for fertilizer, and in 1932, P. C. Manley and George Rusmiselle dug into the mound, exposing large numbers of human bones. Manley promised the collection would be kept intact and displayed in Staunton, but artifacts from the dig were sold instead.

In 1964, as road construction was planned through the site, the mound was excavated and destroyed. Dozens of complete human skeletons, many additional loose human bones, and artifacts buried with them were removed. Most of these went to the Museum of Natural History, while the 800-year-old skeleton of an infant, along with the beads and shells surrounding them, went to the Reuel B. Pritchett Museum at Bridgewater College.

Bridgewater College displayed the infant from 1964 until 1992, when they removed it from display after passage of the Native American Graves Protection and Repatriation Act (NAGPRA). The college did not repatriate the infant at that time, even though the Monacan affiliation of Virginia burial mounds was already well established.

In 2010, the Code of Federal Regulations allowed institutions to reach out to non-federally-recognized “tribes that are recognized as aboriginal to the area from which the human remains were removed” when it came to “unidentifiable remains.”

In January 2022, Monacan tribal members visited Bridgewater College to pray over the infant's cremated remains. In September 2022, Bridgewater College confirmed to historian Rebecca Jarrett that it had received the infant skeleton in 1964 and had cremated the remains 32 years later, in 1996. They transported the remains for cremation, where they were mixed with the remains of other Native Americans from sites in Virginia, Tennessee, and Arkansas.

In doing so, Bridgewater College failed to comply with NAGPRA. Remains subject to NAGPRA are to be repatriated under the Act, and any other action outside NAGPRA is a failure to comply. Such a failure is a civil violation and may, in some circumstances, also be criminal.

In July 2023, the National Park Service published a Notice of Inventory Completion stating that there was a relationship of shared group identity between remains and funerary objects from the Lewis Creek Burial Mound in Bridgewater College's collection and the Monacan Indian Nation, and that repatriation could proceed on or after August 17, 2023.

The remains would likely be reburied on Monacan land at Bear Mountain rather than at the destroyed mound site near Verona. Rebecca Jarrett planned to seek a state highway marker for the site on Indian Mound Road.

== See also ==
- Monacan Indian Nation
- Linville Mound
- Ely Mound
- Mounds in Virginia
