= John Kline =

John Kline is the name of:

- John Kline (basketball) (fl. 1950s), retired Harlem Globetrotter (1953–1959) who founded the Black Legends of Professional Basketball in 1996
- John Kline (politician) (born 1947), American congressman from Minnesota
- John Robert Kline (1891–1955), American mathematician
- John Kline (elder) (1797-1864), American church elder

== See also ==
- John Klein (disambiguation)
