= Gerard Fowke =

American archeologist and geologist

Gerard Fowke (June 25, 1855 – March 5, 1933) was an American archeologist and geologist best known for his studies of Native American mounds.

== Childhood ==
Born Charles Mitchell Smith in Charleston Bottom, Mason County, Kentucky, near Maysville, his parents were John D. Smith and Sibella Smith. He was the eldest of five children and the only one to survive to adulthood. Fowke's mother died before he reached ten years of age. He spent his childhood in Kentucky and was raised by his father and other relatives. In 1887, he legally changed his name to Gerard Fowke, naming himself after a prominent American ancestor of his maternal grandmother, Elizabeth Fowke.

== Early career ==
He worked as a bookkeeper and clerk in Nashville, Tennessee, before returning to Kentucky in 1873. From 1873 to 1876, Fowke was a student and farmer in Kentucky. In 1876, he moved to central Illinois, where he taught grammar school for two years. He then taught in Brown County, Ohio, before taking a position as a grammar school principal in Sidney, Ohio, from 1879 to 1881. In 1881, he took a class at Ohio State University in geology and archeology. After the course, he became interested enough in the subjects to spend the rest of his life in the study of them.

== Career ==
Fowke's career in science began in 1883 when he studied geological formations associated with the Wabash, Arkansas, and Missouri Rivers. The river he spent most of his time studying, though, was the Ohio River. During the course of his career, Fowke thoroughly investigated the geology of the Ohio River from its mouth to its source. He studied Flint Ridge for the Smithsonian Institution, detailing his findings in the "Smithsonian Report" in 1884. In 1886, he studied the archeology of the Monongahela River Valley of Pennsylvania.

Fowke was hired by antiquities collector Warren Moorehead in 1889 to study Native American mounds in Ross County, Ohio. Working together with a team of laborers for about a month, the two excavated 12–15 mounds. Fowke worked for the Smithsonian Institution, under the Bureau of Ethnology, from 1885 to 1888, studying Native American sites in the eastern United States. In the 1890s, he continued excavations, including at the Linville Mound in Virginia. He searched for evidence of pre-historic settlements on Vancouver Island in Canada from 1896 to 1897.

He travelled in Siberia on the Amur River, looking for evidence that East Asians migrated to North America to become Native Americans. Working for the American Museum of Natural History of New York City, he travelled to Vladivostok in 1898 with fellow researcher Berthold Laufer. The two spent several months together, travelling the Amur River by boat and studying the Tungusic, Ainu, and Gilyak peoples. They took photos and recorded songs, and studied artifacts and native cultures. The two researchers later split up, with Fowke continuing to travel the Amur River by canoe, accompanied only by a stranded sailor and a Tungusic native. Fowke started the expedition from Victoria, British Columbia, sailing first to Japan, then Vladivostok, then Khabarovsk, Siberia. From there, he boated on a canoe for 700 miles along the Amur River to the Channel of Tartary, down the coast to the Sea of Okhotsk, then back to Nikolayevsk-on-Amur.

From 1911 to 1916, he worked for the Missouri Historical Society, studying the geology of the Saint Louis, Missouri area. Before this, he had studied geology in Ohio. Fowke also worked for the Jefferson Memorial in Saint Louis, setting up a collection of Native American relics there. He rearranged them in 1926, and set up a new collection in 1930.

In 1912, Fowke travelled to Guatemala, where he examined ancient mounds in the abandoned Mayan city of Quiriguá. He travelled to the Hawaiian Islands, looking in vain for a pre-historic population. Fowke spent several months examining pre-historic remains in Mexico, New Orleans, and New Mexico, including the Carlsbad Caverns. He was once given a grant of $2500, spending the money investigating the geology of Yellowstone National Park. In 1926, he studied Native American burial mounds at the present-day Marksville State Historic Site in Louisiana. Working for the Smithsonian Institution, he was the first archeologist to study the area and produce a detailed map.

Fowke spent much of his life studying ancient mounds of rocks and earth, trying to prove the existence of a civilization that pre-dated what we currently understand to be the Native Americans. He never found evidence of a civilization distinct from later Native Americans. His 1902 book Archæological History of Ohio, which summarized his research, helped to prove that these mounds were indeed made by the Native Americans. His research was sponsored by the American Museum of Natural History of New York, the Philadelphia Academy of Natural Sciences, the Smithsonian Institution, and others.

Fowke published at least 59 works during his career, mostly regarding his archeological research on Native Americans. His publications appeared in numerous journals, newspapers, and magazines, including Science, Popular Science, and publications of the Smithsonian Institution. Most of Fowke's research was done on foot. He walked an estimated 100,000 miles during the course of his career. He did geological or archeological research in nearly every state in the United States. Fowke was a lifelong bachelor and died with no close kin. He moved to Madison, Indiana, in 1922 and lived there the remainder of his life. Fowke died in King's Daughters' Hospital in Madison of natural causes at age of 78 and was interred in Springdale Cemetery in Madison.
