= John Acker (Virginia politician) =

American politician (1845-?)

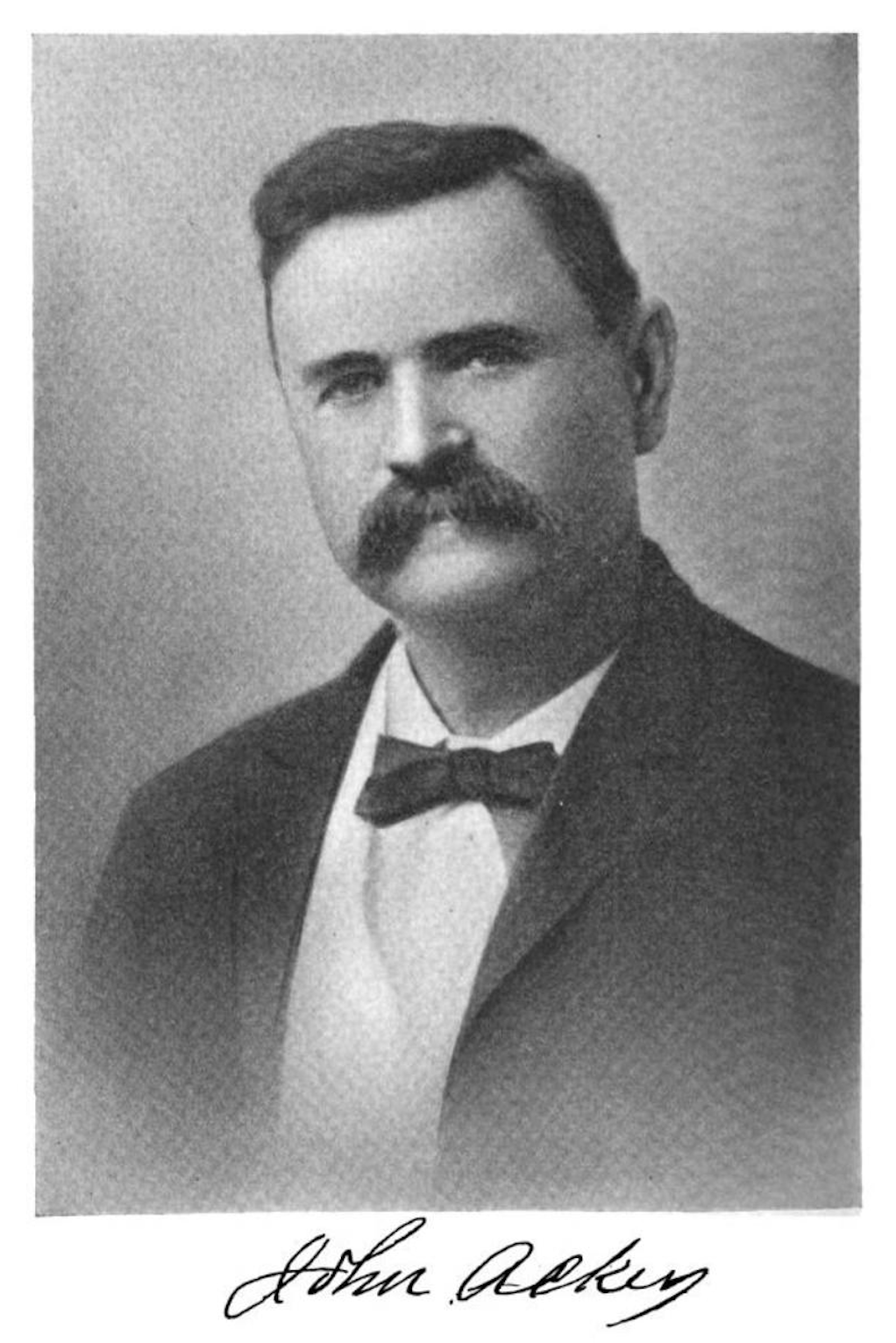
- John Acker, from History of Virginia (1924)

Member of the Virginia House of Delegates from the Rockingham County district
- In office 1885–1887

Member of the Virginia Senate
- In office 1888–1891

Personal details
- Born: July 24, 1845 Rockingham County, Virginia, U.S.
- Party: Republican
- Spouse: Mary J. Funk
- Occupation: Politician, livestock dealer

Military service
- Allegiance: Confederate States of America
- Branch/service: Confederate States Army
- Unit: Company D, 163rd Virginia Cavalry; McNeill's Rangers

John Acker was a Republican politician from Rockingham County, Virginia, who served in the Virginia House of Delegates from 1885 to 1887 and in the Senate of Virginia from 1888 to 1891. He was also a prominent political figure in Singers Glen, where he married Mary Jane Funk, daughter of Timothy and Susan Ruebush Funk, and built a local Republican organization in Rockingham County, later described in the Singers Glen Historic District nomination as the "Acker Republican machine of the late nineteenth and early twentieth centuries".

== Early life ==
Acker was born on July 24, 1845, on Linville Creek in Rockingham County, Virginia, the son of Peter Acker and Louisa Ann Barnes Acker.

== Personal life ==
On August 28, 1875, Acker married Mary Jane Funk, daughter of Timothy and Susan (Ruebush) Funk, in Singers Glen. The couple had several children. Acker was a Baptist.

== Civil War ==
Acker joined the Confederate army on August 3, 1863. He joined Company D of the 163rd Virginia Cavalry, also known as McNeill's Rangers.

== Business career ==
After the Civil War, Acker dealt in livestock. According to History of Virginia, he later became a dealer and shipper in stock from Rockingham County and for nearly fifty years continued business connections in Baltimore, Washington, Philadelphia, New York City, and Richmond.

== Political career ==
Acker represented Rockingham County in the Virginia House of Delegates from 1885 to 1887 and served on the Claims, Executive Expenditures, and Privileges and Elections committees. He later served in the Virginia Senate from 1888 to 1891. In 1905 he was the Republican candidate for state treasurer.
