= Breneman-Turner Mill =

Historic grist mill in Virginia, US

- U.S. National Register of Historic Places
- Virginia Landmarks Register
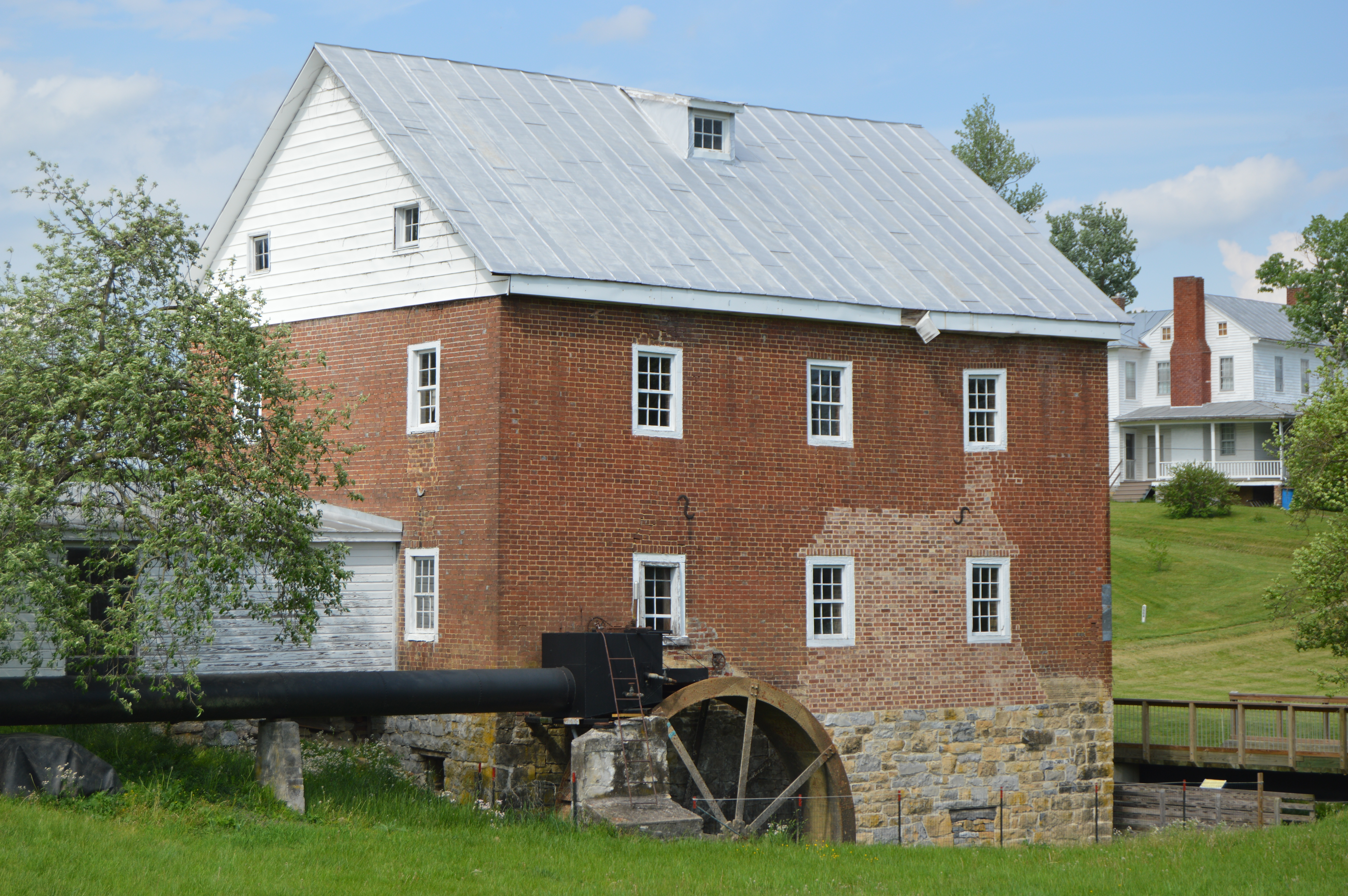
- Roadside view of the mill

- Location within Virginia Location within the United States
- Location: 5036 Turners Mill Ln., near Harrisonburg, Virginia
- Coordinates: 38°31′31″N 78°52′31″W
- Area: 1.1 acres (0.45 ha)
- Built: c. 1800
- Architectural style: Federal
- NRHP reference No.: 06000325
- VLR No.: 082-0023

Significant dates
- Added to NRHP: April 20, 2006
- Designated VLR: March 8, 2006

Breneman-Turner Mill is a historic grist mill located near Harrisonburg in Rockingham County, Virginia. It was built on Linville Creek about 1800 by Abraham Breneman, and is a 2½-story, Federal style brick building. The building retains its water wheel, measuring 16 feet in diameter and 5 feet wide, and three sets of burr stones. The mill survived General Philip Sheridan’s burning of the Shenandoah Valley in 1864; neighbors helped put out fires set to the mill.

On July 18, 1840, Joseph Cromer placed the following ad in the Rockingham Register:

CASH FOR WHEAT

2,600 Bushels Wanted

The subscriber wishes to purchase 2,000 bushels of good Merchantable WHEAT, weighing 60 pounds to the bushel, to be delivered at Brenneman's Mill, in Rockingham county, for which he will pay 62½ cent Cash per bushel.

On April 4, 1873, Peter Shaver put the mill up for sale with the following announcement:

LARGE AND VALUABLE MERCHANT MILL ON LINVILL'S CREEK, FOR SALE

I offer for sale my large and valuable MERCHANT MILL, located one mile from the head of Linvill's Creek, Rockingham county, known formerly as Brenneman's Mill. The capacity of the Mill is 2 pair of burrs, and one pair of choppers, and it is capable of making from 15 to 20 barrels of flour per day. It is now in running order, and is located in one of the finest wheat growing sections in the Valley. I will sell the Mill, Miller's house, garden & c., or, if desired, will sell the large Brick Dwelling I now occupy, attached to which is 8 acres of first-rate land, with Orchard and all necessary out-buildings Or, if desired, I will sell as much as fifty-eight acres of land with the Mill and brick dwelling.

The above valuable property will be offered for sale privately until the first day of May, when, if not sold, it will be offered for sale at public auction, on the premises,

ON THURSDAY THE 8TH DAY OF MAY,

at which time I will sell a considerable amount of valuable Personal property, consisting of a No. 1 four-house Road Wagon, all complete, one four-horse Plantation Wagon, Farming Implements, a number of good Milch cows, a lot of Stock Hogs, a No. 1 Double Corn Sheller, a Windmill, together with Household and Kitchen Furniture, consisting of Tables, Chairs, Bedsteads, Cooking Stove and other Stoves, some Bacon, and a number of other articles too tedious to mention.

Terms made known on application to the subscriber, or on the day of sale.

In September 1873, Jonathan Rinker of Pendleton County, West Virginia bought the mill and six or seven acres of land for $6000.

Due to its essential role in grinding grain into flour, hominy, and feed for cattle, the water-powered mill served as a center for community life during pioneer days. The mill is the only pre-Civil War mill remaining in Rockingham County with all its grist mill equipment still in place. The mill's most recent operator, J. Howard Turner, operated the mill from 1933 to 1988 and envisioned it as a place where future generations could learn about milling and see the process.

It was listed on the Virginia Landmarks Register in 2006 and on the National Register of Historic Places in 2007.

== Gallery ==
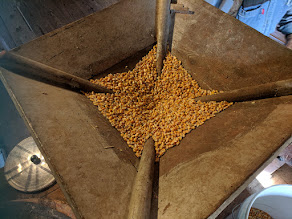
Breneman-Turner mill grinding corn

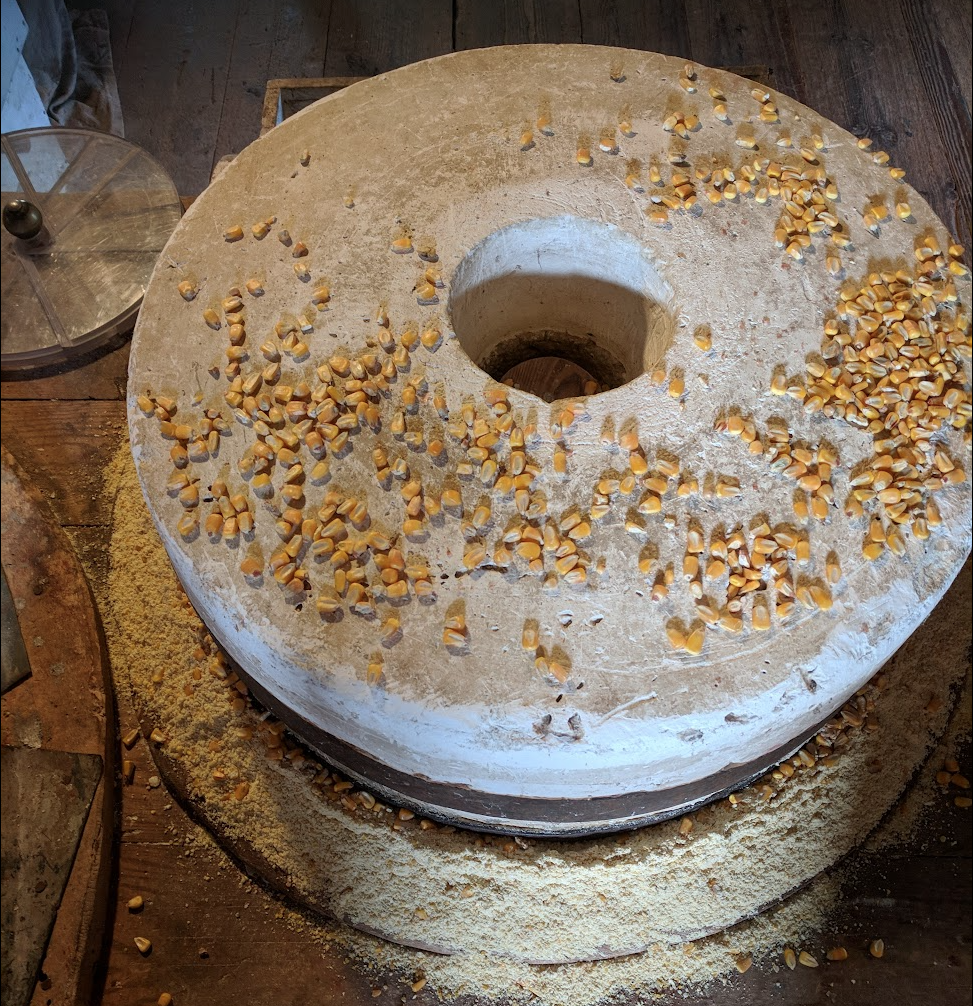
Milling equipment at Breneman-Turner Mill

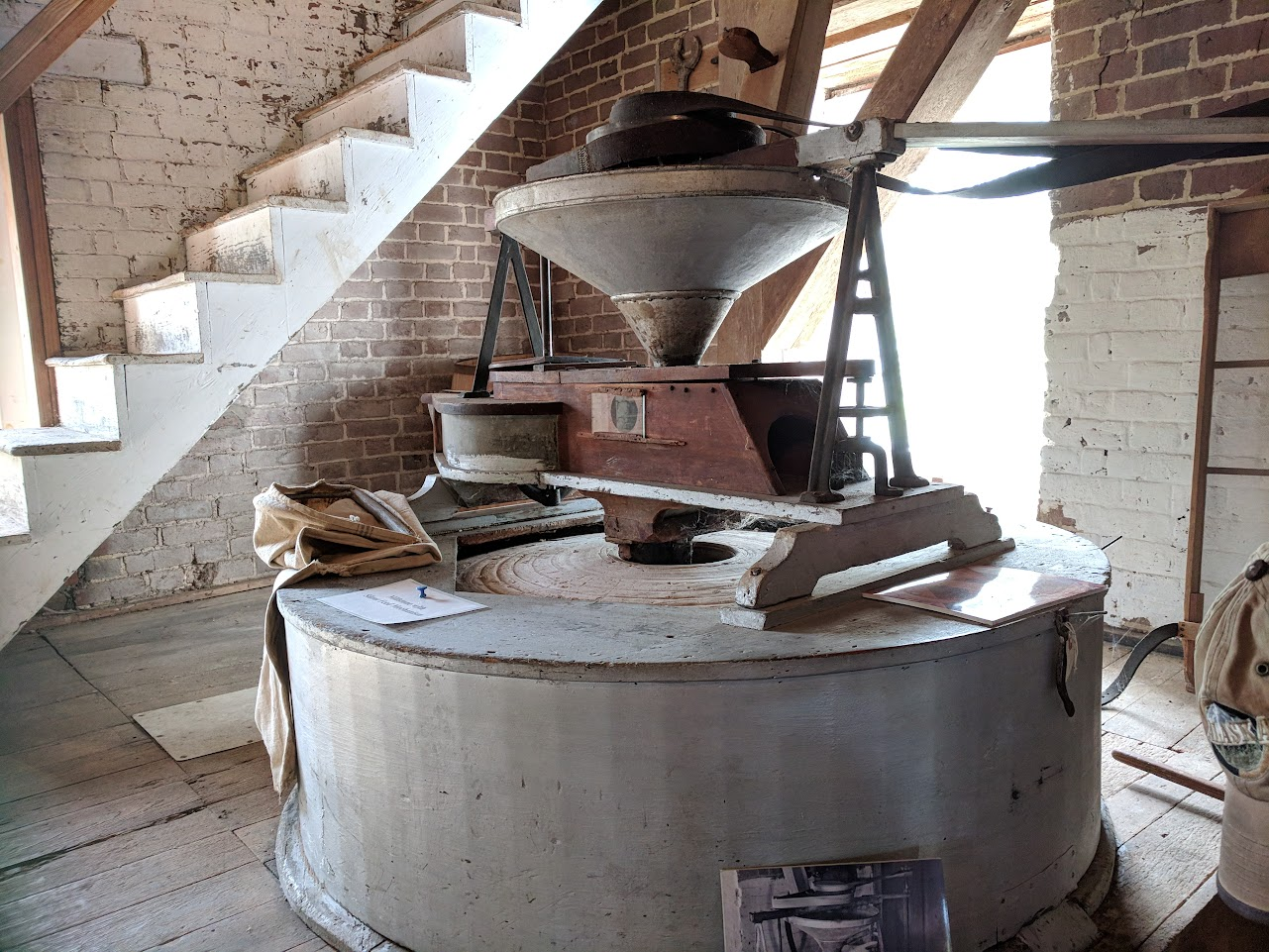
Breneman-Turner mill hopper

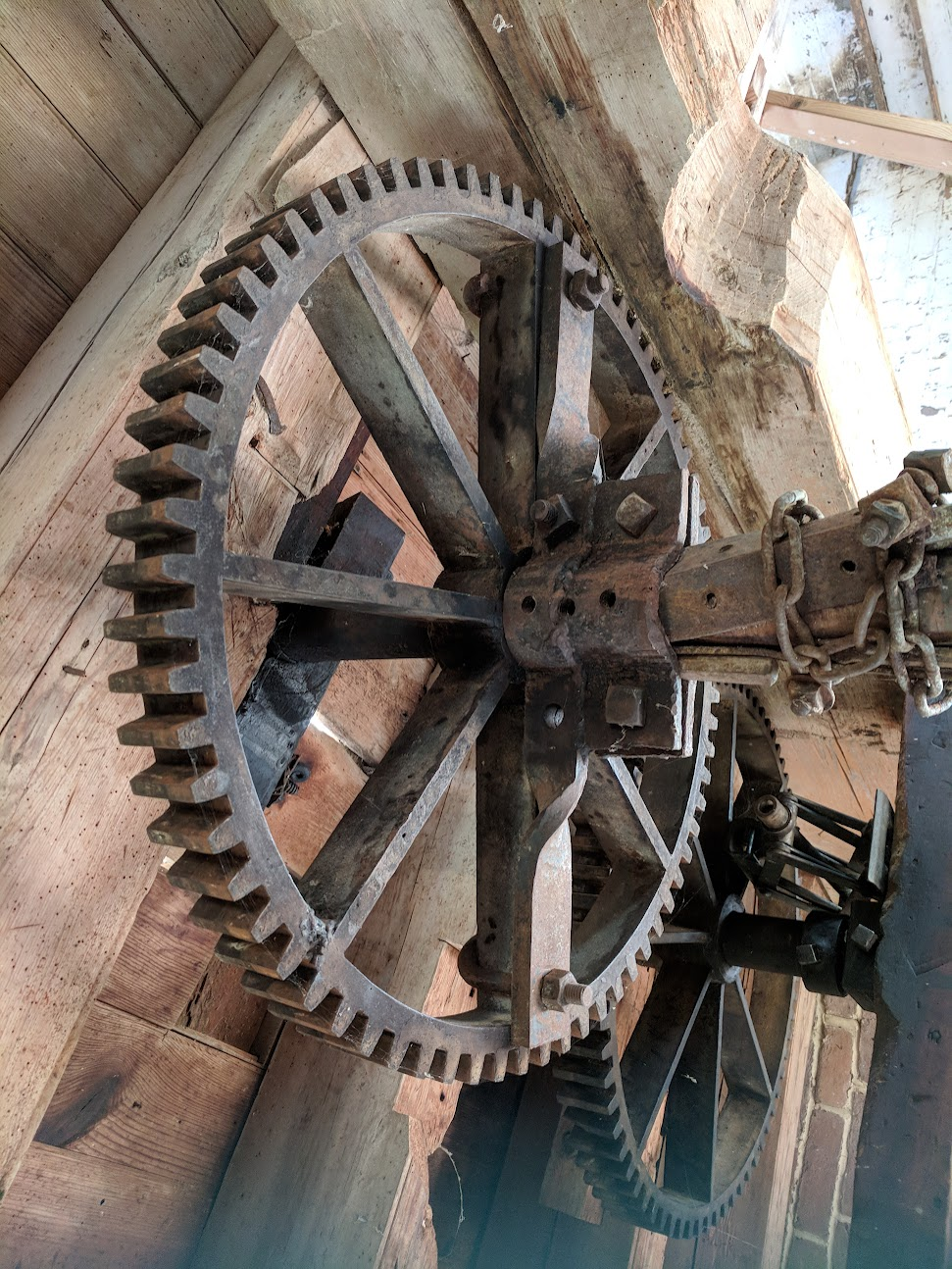
Breneman-Turner mill gears

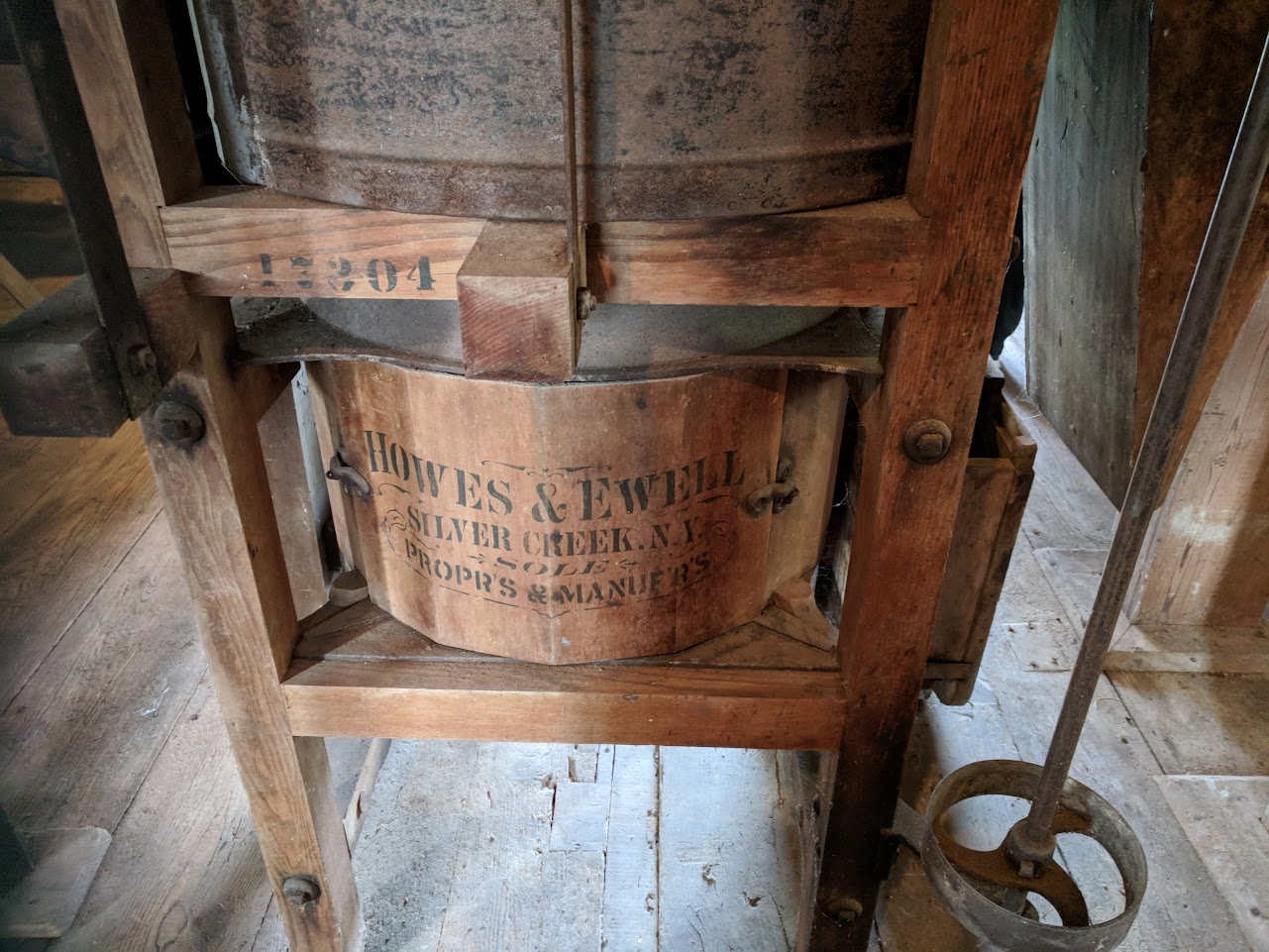
Breneman-Turner mill equipment

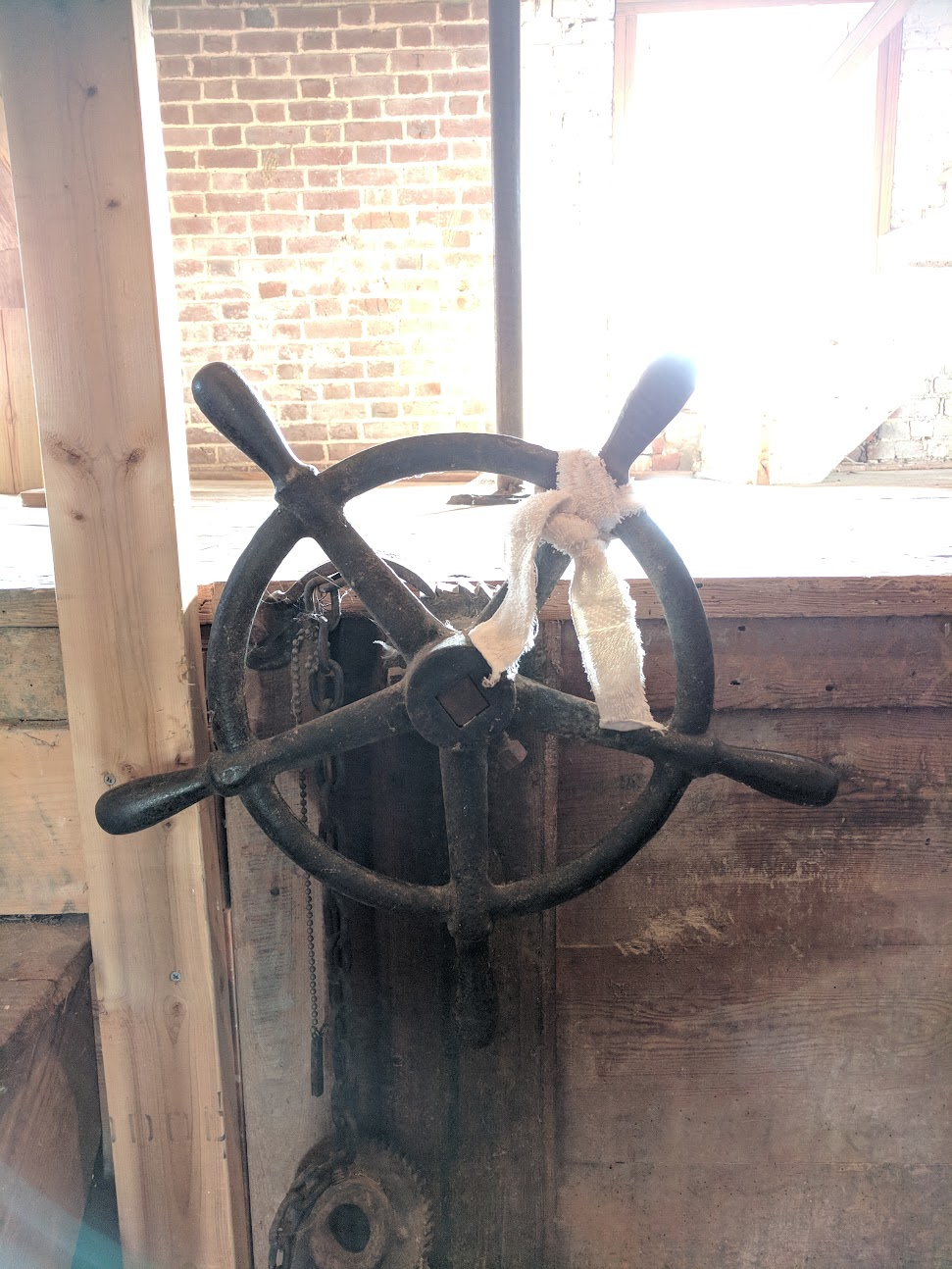
Wheel at Breneman-Turner mill

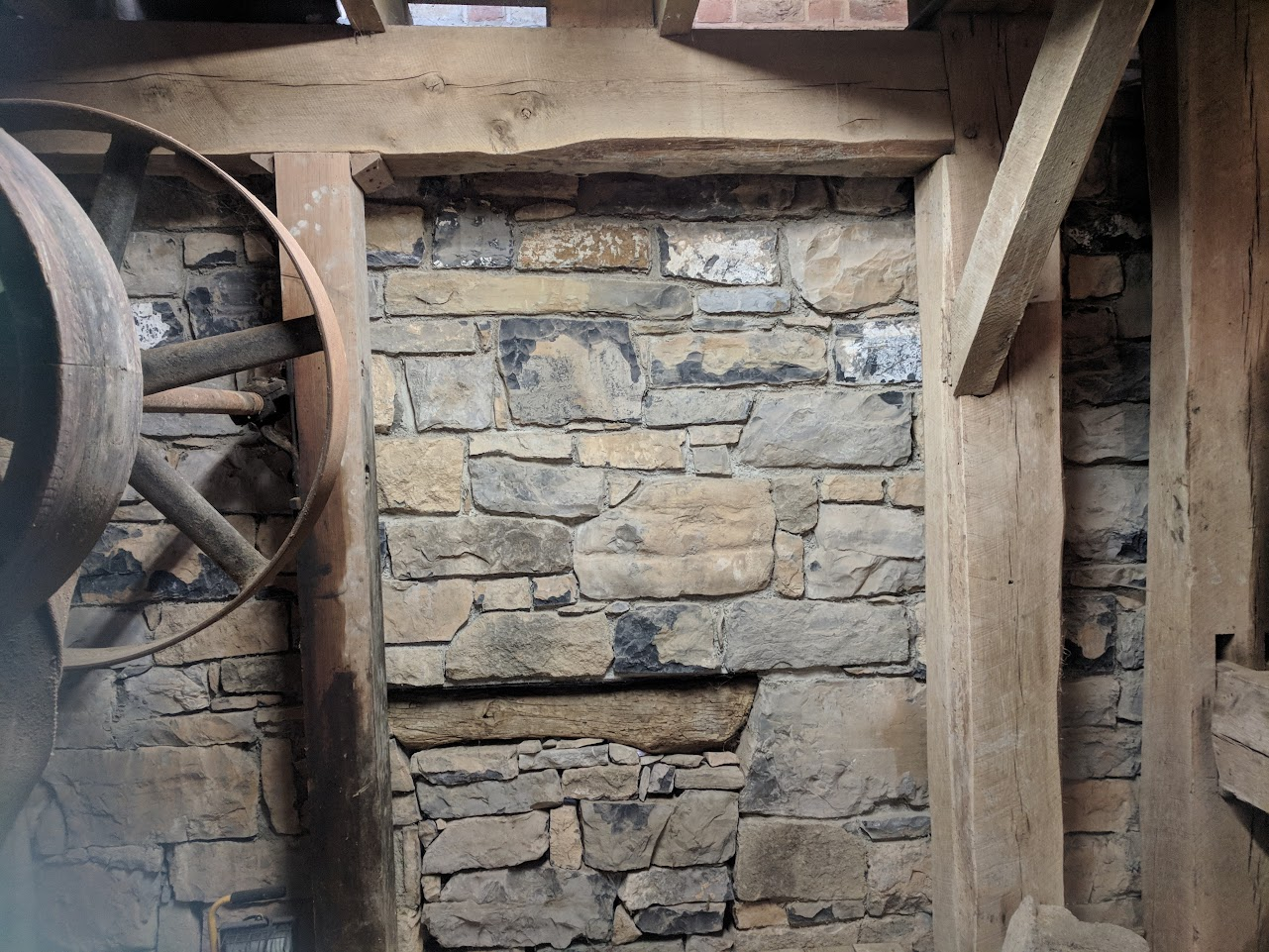
Breneman-Turner Mill foundation

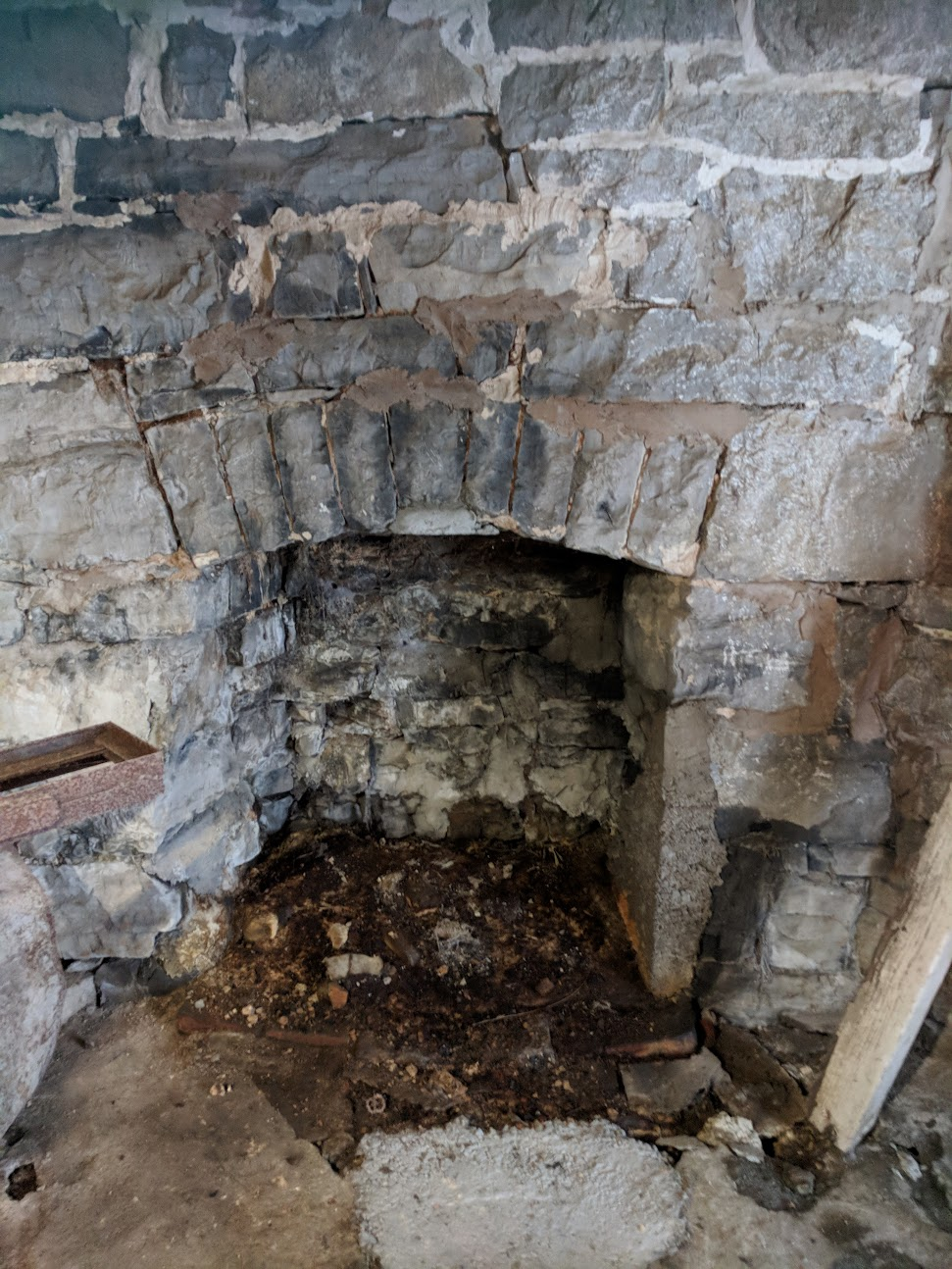
Breneman-Turner Mill fireplace

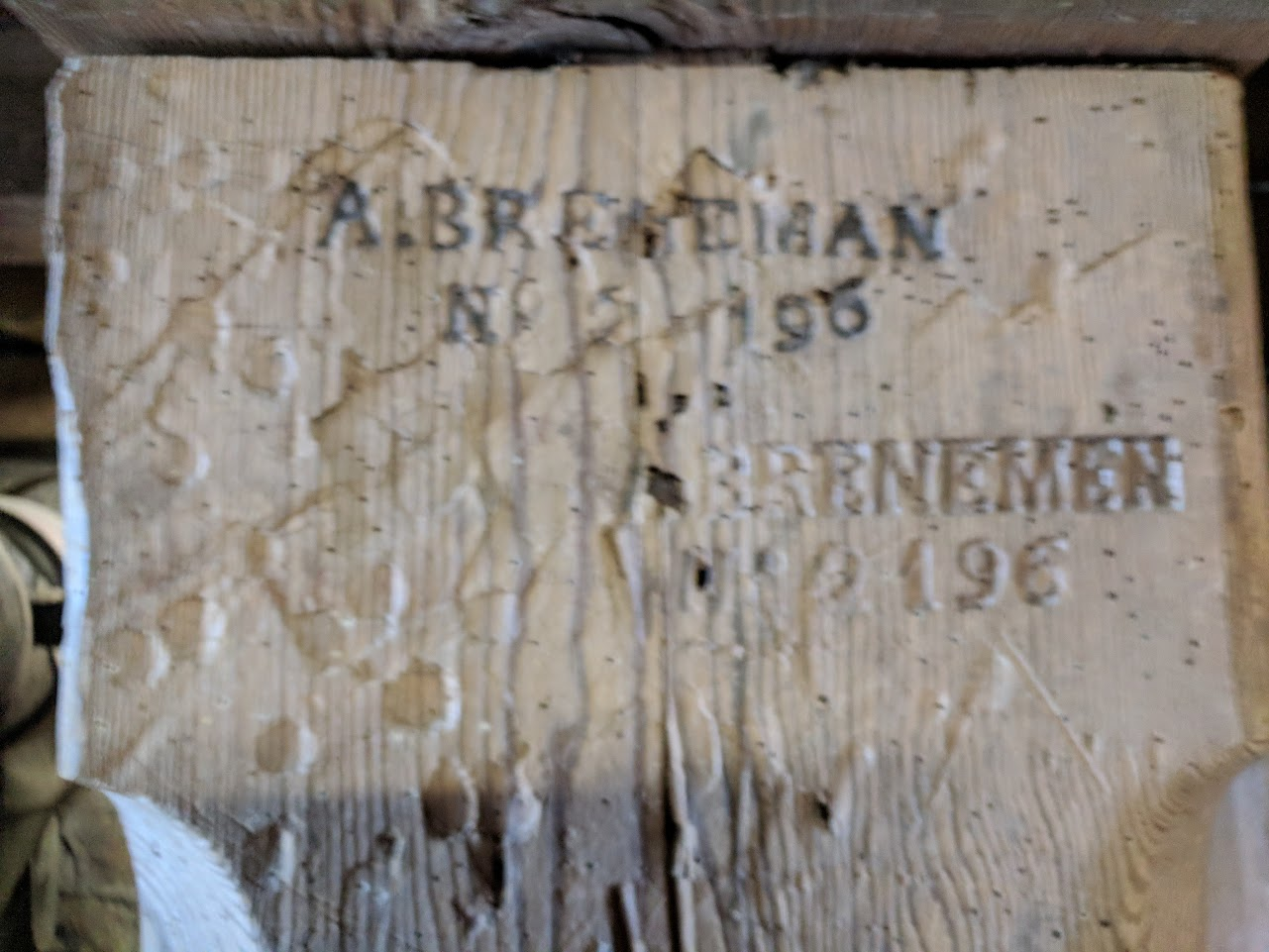
Builder of Breneman-Turner mill
