= Brocks Gap Dam =

- Location of the proposed Brocks Gap Dam
- Country: United States
- Coordinates: 38°38′38.42″N 78°51′49.24″W
- Status: Unbuilt
- Construction cost: $11,640,000 (1963)
- Owner: U.S. Army Corps of Engineers

Dam and spillways
- Type of dam: Earthfill
- Impounds: North Fork of the Shenandoah River
- Height: 147 ft (45 m)
- Length: 860 feet (260 m)
- Spillway type: Unregulated overflow

Reservoir
- Total capacity: 187,200 acre-feet (0.2309 km^{3})
- Surface area: 2,810 acres (1,140 ha)

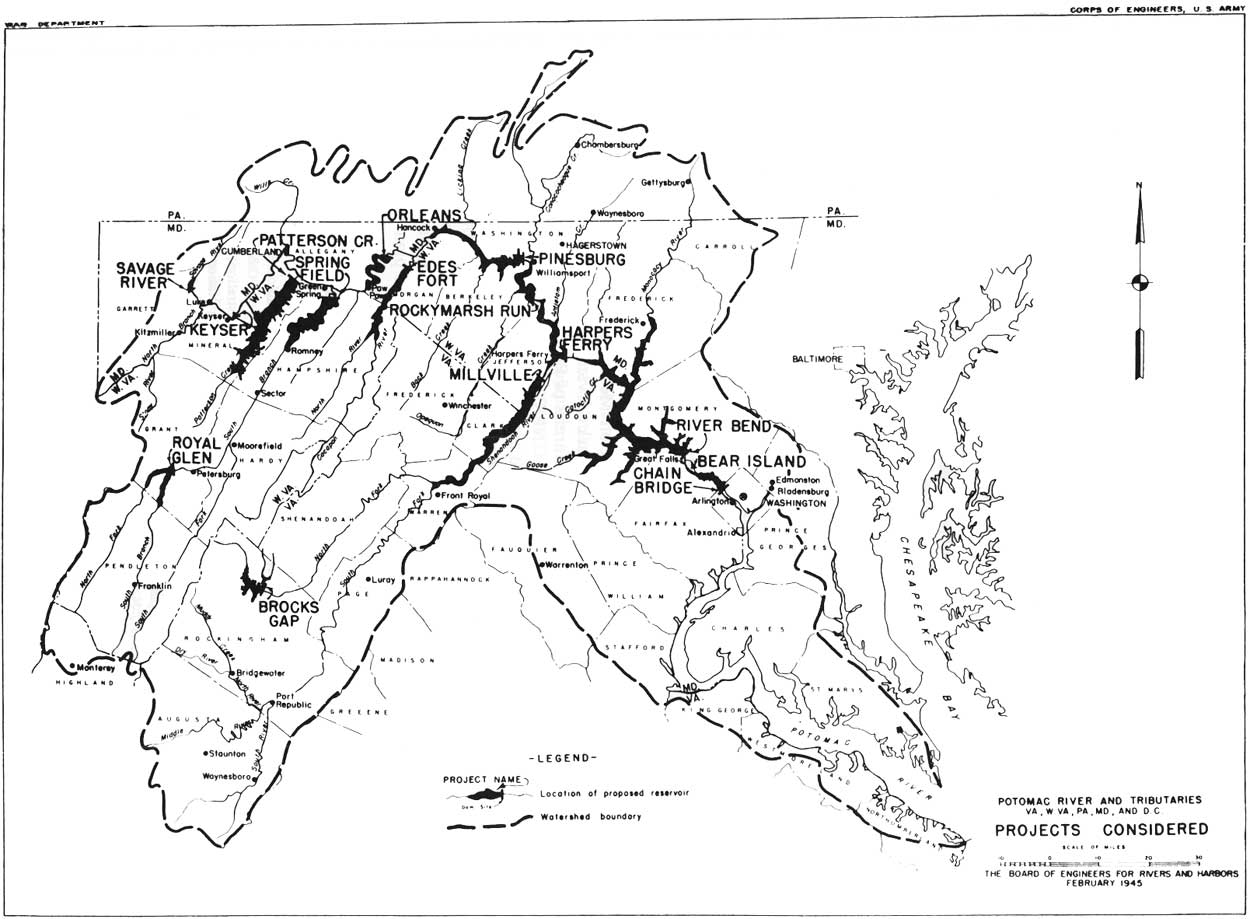
Dams proposed in the Potomac/Shenandoah River basin in 1945, Brocks Gap Dam in the lower part of the map

Brocks Gap Dam was a never-built proposal for a water storage dam on the North Fork of the Shenandoah River at Brocks Gap in northwest Virginia. The proposal by the U.S. Army Corps of Engineers encountered opposition from local residents and was withdrawn in 1967.

== Potomac River Basin system ==
Brocks Gap Dam was first proposed in the 1920s by the U.S. Army Corps of Engineers on the North Fork of the Shenandoah River, at a cost in 1921 dollars of $1,889,895. The proposal was revived and updated after World War II and advanced in the late 1950s. The dam was to be part of a series of dams proposed by the Corps' Potomac River Basin Report, which envisioned an ambitious series of water storage and flood control dams throughout the Potomac River basin, responding to a perception of need for additional water and a threat of flooding. Brocks Gap is a water gap in Little North Mountain in Rockingham County, Virginia, just upstream from Cootes Store.

== Description ==
In 1921 a 213-foot (65 m) high rock-fill dam was proposed by the Corps of Engineers. The proposal was slightly revised during the 1940s and 1950s.

The dam as finally proposed in 1963 was to be of earthfill construction, 147 feet (45 m) high and 860 feet (260 m) long, impounding a reservoir of 187,200 acre-feet (0.2309 km^{3}), with a surface area of 2,810 acres (1,140 ha). Most of the 5-mile (8.0 km) long reservoir was planned to be within the boundaries of George Washington National Forest, but not necessarily on Forest Service property. Construction was planned to start in 1969 and be complete by 1973, at a projected cost of $16,437,000. The reservoir was intended to provide water to the towns of Broadway and Timberville, to lower the temperature of the North Fork and to provide reserve water storage capacity for the Potomac River basin, as well as recreation. The reservoir was expected to inundate 17 commercial buildings, 68 farms, 47 houses, a school and two churches, primarily in the small community of Fulks Run.

The damsite is flanked by the sandstone abutments of Little North Mountain, which rises more than 1,000 feet (300 m) to the north and 900 feet (270 m) to the south. Normal flow would be regulated by an 800-foot (240 m) outlet tunnel in the north abutment, with an unregulated spillway at the south abutment for floods.

== Opposition ==
The dam proposal encountered intense local opposition from residents of the area to be flooded. As early as 1945 the project was condemned by Virginia Senator Harry F. Byrd, who objected to property condemnations and public expenditure. By the 1960s community groups had organized a campaign against the dam. Although the project was supported by the National Park Service, the plan was withdrawn in 1967, in favor of small dams on headwater streams, funded by the Soil Conservation Service.
