= Linville Mound =

Native American burial mound in Rockingham County, Virginia, U.S.

The Linville Mound (also referred to as the Bowman mound) is a burial site built on the floodplain of Linville Creek, two miles northwest of the community of Linville, Virginia. Its exact location is not publicly disclosed to prevent further disturbance. In the 1890s, Linville Mound measured 65 by 75 feet and 3 feet high, although originally it stood 10 to 12 feet tall. During heavy rains, the mound was often the only dry spot for 2 or 3 miles along the stream. This site and similar ones in the region are up to 1100 years old (between 900 and 1700 C.E.) and were used for hundreds of years.

== Burial site disturbance ==
The mound was plowed extensively. In the late 19th century, S. M. Bowman farmed the area.

Over the entire surface of the mound, to a depth of inches, there is not so much as a space 3 inches square, that did not contain fragments of bone which had been dragged down from the top by cultivation.

— Gerard Fowke, Archeologic Investigations in James and Potomac Valleys

In 1891 or 1892, Gerard Fowke, assisted by others, further disturbed the Linville mound, digging into it with five trenches. They excavated individuals, cremated remains, as well as sections of the mound where people had been buried together. The first remains they saw were those of a child. Gerard Fowke's excavations were supported by the Smithsonian Institution’s Bureau of American Ethnology. While excavating, Fowke counted the skulls of 388 people, estimating that more than 800 people had been laid to rest there.

Fowke went on to remove people's remains from the burial mound and take the skulls of 16 individuals to the Smithsonian National Museum of Natural History.

Items from the Linville (Bowman) Mound crafted from bone and antler; from a 1950 figure in American Antiquity.

In 1894, Fowke removed two moose antler combs from the mound. A virtually identical comb was removed from a burial site near the Potomac River in Washington, DC. Carved stone pendants ("gorgets") were also removed from the mound. Other items crafted from bone and antler were taken from the mound to the U.S. National Museum.

== Preservation and access ==
The Linville Mound is protected and not open to the public. Preservation efforts involve collaboration with descendant communities such as the Monacan Nation. Recent initiatives use non-invasive approaches to identify and protect what remains of the site. Mounds in western Virginia are affiliated with Monacan, Manahoac, and other neighboring tribes.

== Other mounds in Virginia ==
Other documented Native American mounds in Virginia include:

- Bell / Battle Mound (44RB7) — Rockbridge County, pottery
- Brumback Mound (44PA177) — Page County
- Clover Creek Mound (44HD9) — Highland County, disturbed by Gerard Fowke, with pottery taken to the United States National Museum
- East Mound (AU-35-M)
- Ely Mound - Lee County
- Hayes Creek Mound (44RB2) — Rockbridge County, human bones, pipe, beads, ceramics, taken to the Valentine Museum and lost
- Hirsh Mound (44BA35) — Bath County
- Jefferson Mound (44AB15) — Albemarle County, exact location now lost
- John East Mound (44AU35) — Augusta County
- Koiner Mound — Augusta County, human bone fragments and pipe, taken to the Valentine Museum and lost.
- Leesville Mound (44CP8) — Campbell County
- Lewis Creek Mound (44AU20) — Augusta County
- Rapidan Mound (44OR1) — Orange County
- Senedo Mound (44SH129) — Shenandoah County
- Timberville Mound — Rockingham County
- Wallace Mounds — Highland County
- Withrow Mound — Bath County
