= John Klein =

John Klein could refer to:

- John Klein (soccer, born 1965), American soccer player and coach
- John Klein (soccer, born 1999), American soccer player
- John Klein (rugby league) (born 1952), Australian rugby league footballer
- John Klein (baseball), baseball player
- Johnny Klein (1918–1997), American musician

== See also ==
- John Kline (disambiguation)
