= Edom, Virginia =

Edom
- Unincorporated community
- Location in Virginia Edom (the United States)
- Coordinates: 38°31′32″N 78°51′40″W
- Country: United States
- State: Virginia
- County: Rockingham County

Edom is an unincorporated community located in Rockingham County, in the U.S. state of Virginia. It is located along State Route 42 at the crossroads with State Route 721, north of Harrisonburg and southeast of Singers Glen. Linville Creek flows through the village.

Near Edom on January 14, 1794, Dr. Jesse Bennett performed the first Caesarean section and oophorectomy in the United States, operating on his wife to give birth to their daughter. A historical marker was erected by the state of Virginia in 1983 commemorating the event.

Baxter House, John K. Beery Farm, and Edom Store and Post Office are listed on the National Register of Historic Places.
