= Brocks Gap =

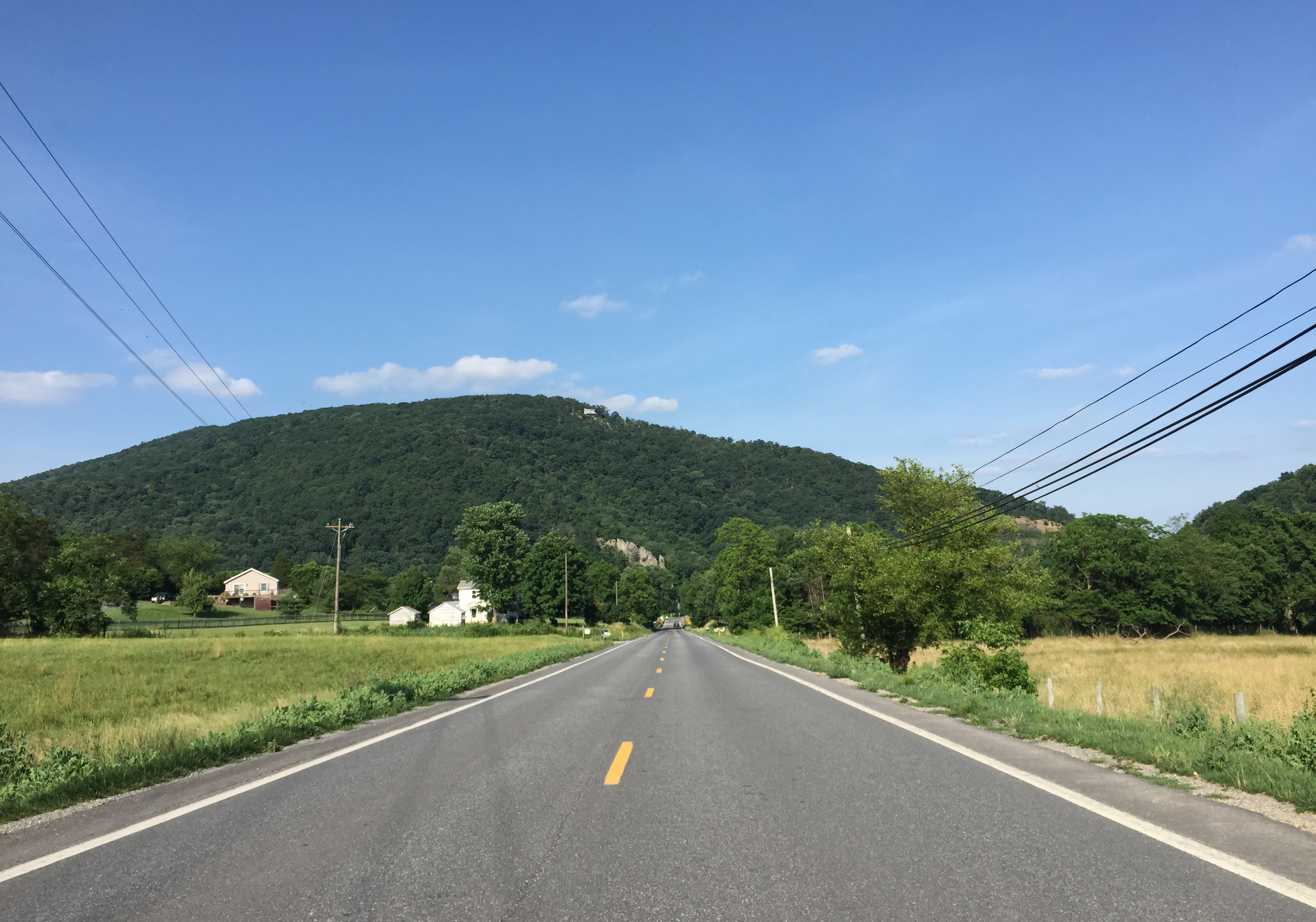
- View east along SR 259 approaching Brocks Gap

- Location within Virginia
- Elevation: 1,073 ft (327 m)
- Traversed by: Virginia Route 259

Third Approach
- Location: Rockingham county, Virginia, United States
- Range: Little North Mountain
- Coordinates: 38.6431735°N 78.86280341°W

Brocks Gap is a water gap in Rockingham County, Virginia, where the North Fork of the Shenandoah River flows through Little North Mountain. In 1784, George Washington followed the old road across the valley from Brocks Gap, crossing Linville Creek to Port Republic.

The gap was the proposed site of the never-built Brocks Gap Dam and is traversed by Virginia Route 259.
