= Lincoln Homestead and Cemetery =

Historic house and cemetery in Rockingham County, Virginia

- U.S. National Register of Historic Places
- Virginia Landmarks Register
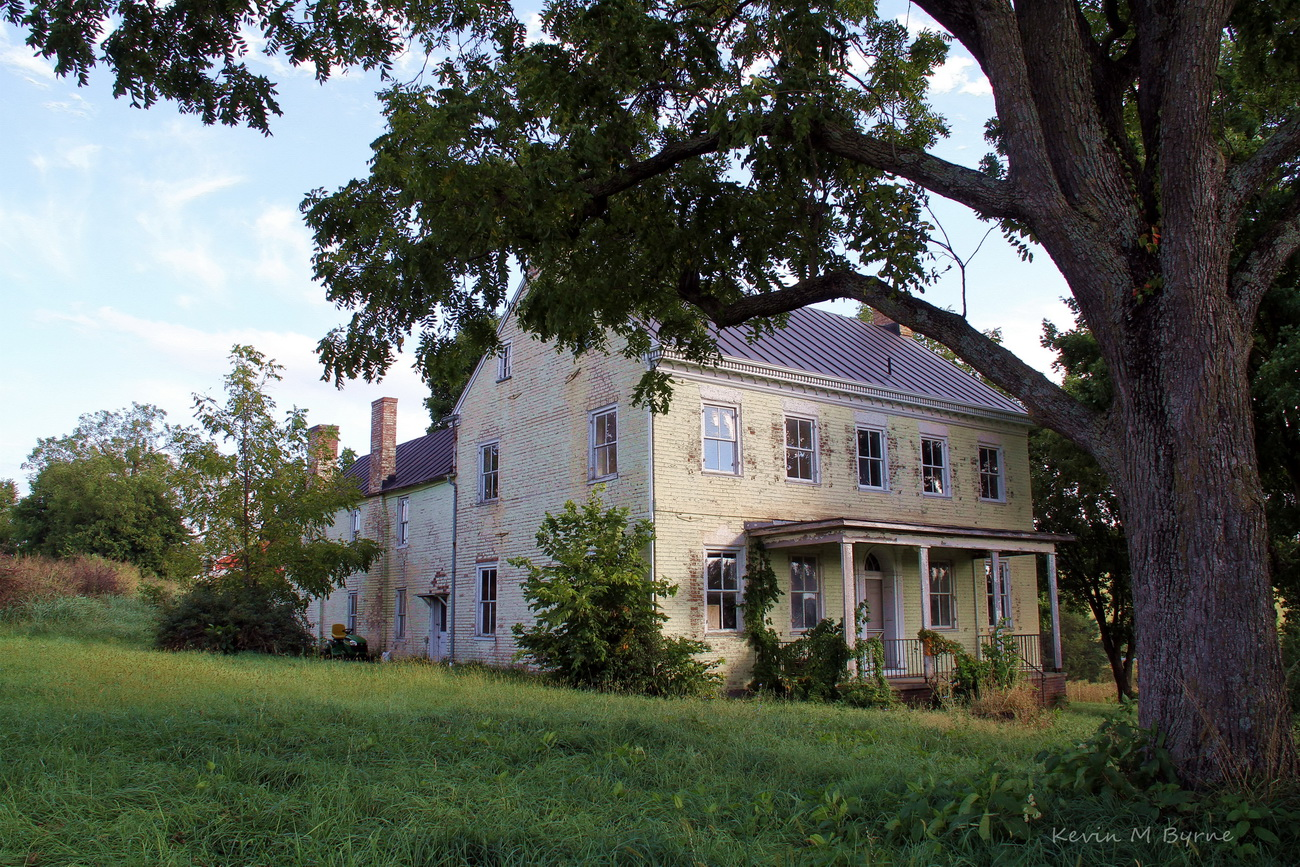
- Lincoln Homestead

- Location within Virginia Location within the United States
- Location: South of the junction of VA 684 and 42, near Broadway, Virginia
- Coordinates: 38°33′35″N 78°49′45″W
- Area: 350 acres (140 ha)
- Built: c. 1800
- Architectural style: Federal
- NRHP reference No.: 72001414
- VLR No.: 082-0014

Significant dates
- Added to NRHP: December 5, 1972
- Designated VLR: August 15, 1972

Lincoln Homestead and Cemetery, also known as the Jacob Lincoln House, is a historic home and cemetery located near Broadway, Rockingham County, Virginia.

== History ==
In or before 1768, John Lincoln migrated from Pennsylvania to the Shenandoah Valley and purchased a large parcel of land on Linville Creek. Around the year 1800, his son, Captain Jacob Lincoln, who had been a soldier in the American Revolution, built the brick Lincoln Homestead where his father's homestead had been.

Abraham, a son of Captain Jacob, added an extensive ell to the home.

Near the Lincolns lived the Bryans. Daniel Boone married one of the Bryans shortly after his travels through this part of the Shenandoah Valley.

The old road across the Valley crosses Linville Creek just a short distance from the homestead. The road connects Brock's Gap with Port Republic, and General George Washington passed by on this road in 1784.

Located on the property is the Lincoln family cemetery in which are buried five generations of the family, as well as Queenie, a woman who was enslaved by the Lincoln family, and "Virginia John" Lincoln, great-grandfather of Abraham Lincoln.

== Characteristics ==
It was built in two sections. The main section was built about 1800, and is a two-story, five-bay, brick structure with a side-gable roof. It features an elaborate wooden cornice with Wall-of-Troy molding, corbels and dentils, and a Federal style doorway. The two-story brick rear ell was built in 1849 and joined to the main house in the early-1900s.

== Preservation and legacy ==
It was listed on the National Register of Historic Places in 1972.

In November 2019, the house was purchased by Sarah and Benjamin Bixler after being vacant for 20 years. The new owners completed a combination of restoration and renovations on the house in 2021.

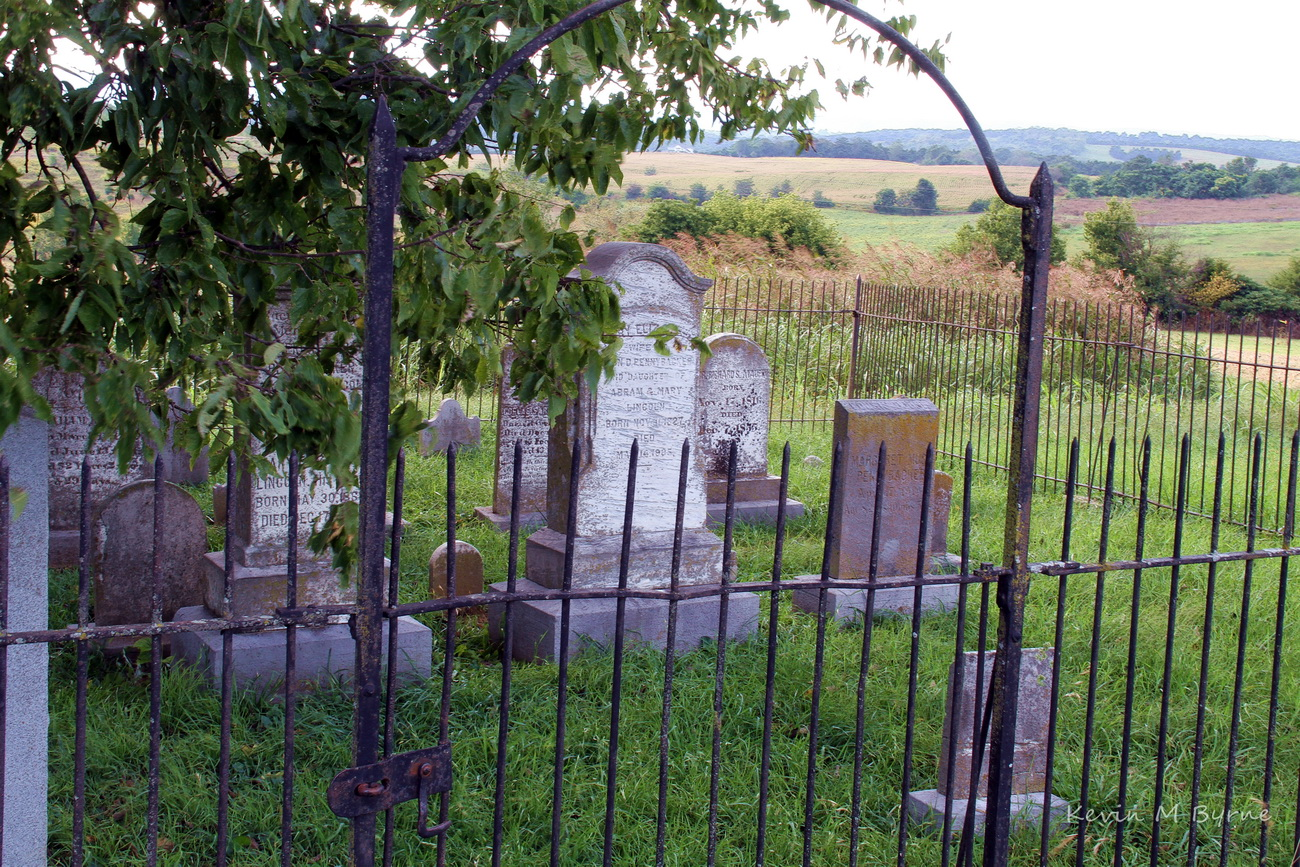
The Lincoln family cemetery
