= Edom Store and Post Office =

Historic building in Virginia, US

- U.S. National Register of Historic Places
- Virginia Landmarks Register
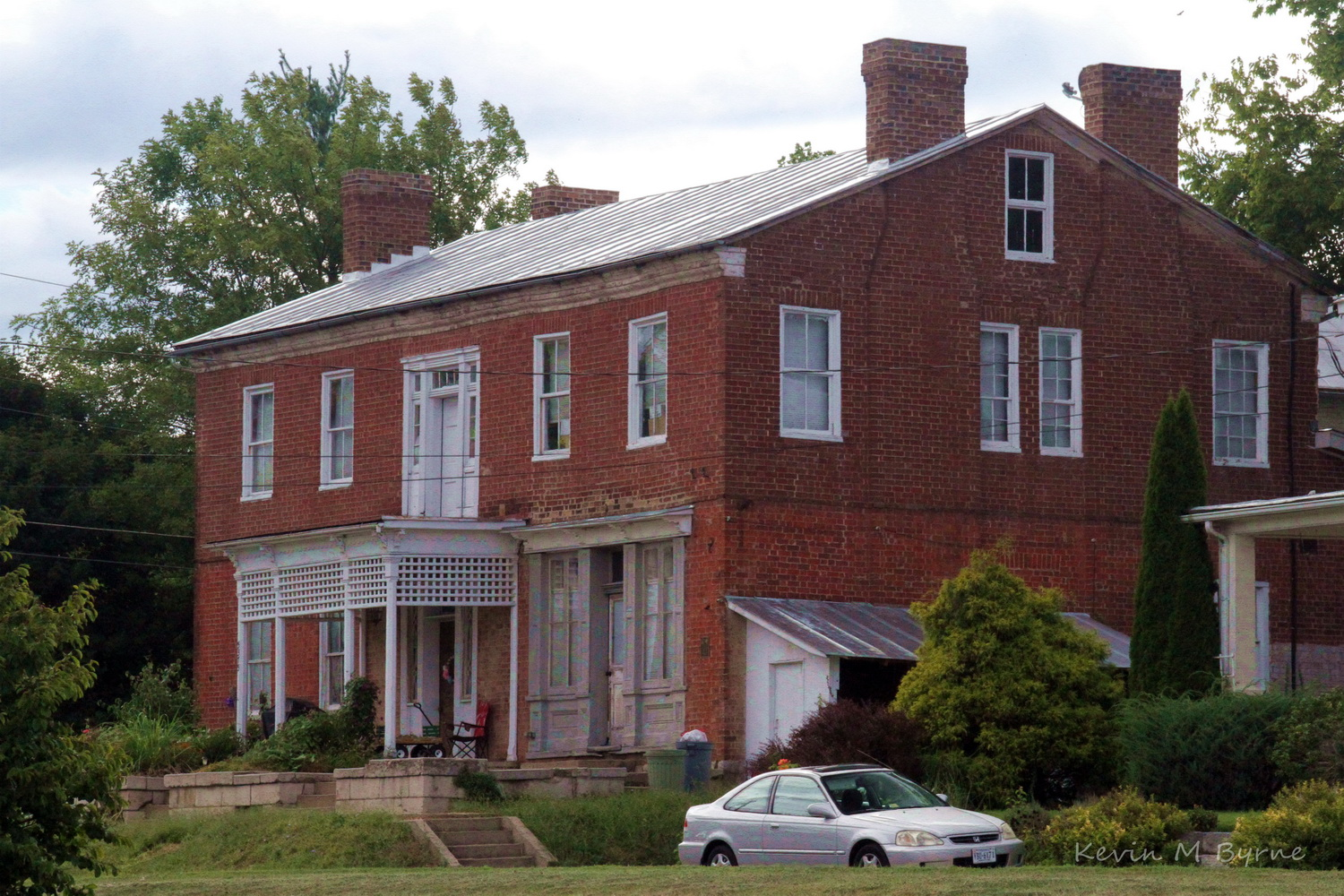

- Location within Virginia Location within the United States
- Location: 5375 Jesse Bennett Way, Edom, Virginia
- Coordinates: 38°31′31″N 78°51′34″W
- Area: 0.6 acres (0.24 ha)
- Built: 1835
- Architectural style: Federal, Greek Revival
- NRHP reference No.: 07000768
- VLR No.: 082-0112

Significant dates
- Added to NRHP: July 24, 2007
- Designated VLR: June 6, 2007

Edom Store and Post Office, also known as John Chrisman Store and Myers and Company, is a historic store and post office located at Edom, Rockingham County, Virginia. It was built about 1835, and is a two-story, brick commercial building. It features a metal-sheathed gable roof, a five-bay façade with center entries on the first and second stories, and a one-story entry porch and a storefront added in the late-19th century. It has a two-story rear ell. The interior is transitional Federal-Greek Revival. Also on the property is a contributing frame barn dated to about 1900. The Edom Post Office operated out of the store until the late 1930s and the store closed about 1940.

It was listed on the National Register of Historic Places in 2007.
