= George Chrisman House =

Historic house in Virginia, United States

- U.S. National Register of Historic Places
- Virginia Landmarks Register
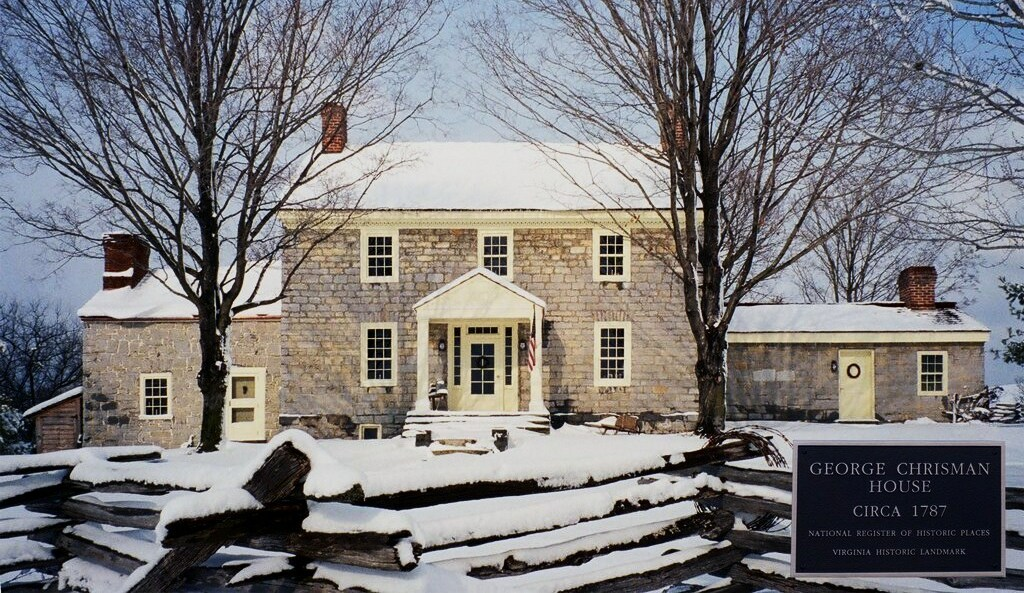

- Location within Virginia Location within the United States
- Location: 5341 Shaver Mill Rd., near Linville, Virginia
- Coordinates: 38°32′48″N 78°52′06″W
- Area: 4.5 acres (1.8 ha)
- Built: 1787
- Built by: Chrisman, George
- Architectural style: Federal
- NRHP reference No.: 06001099
- VLR No.: 082-0136

Significant dates
- Added to NRHP: December 1, 2006
- Designated VLR: September 6, 2006

George Chrisman House is a historic home located near Linville, Rockingham County, Virginia. It was built between 1761 and 1787, and is a two-story, three-bay, limestone Federal style dwelling with flanking wings. The wings are an original 1 1/2-story kitchen wing to the west and a one-story east wing built from limestone taken from the ruins of Shaver Mill about 1960. Also on the property are the ruins of Shaver Mill, built about 1830.

It was listed on the National Register of Historic Places in 2006.
