= John K. Beery Farm =

Historic house in Virginia, United States

- U.S. National Register of Historic Places
- Virginia Landmarks Register
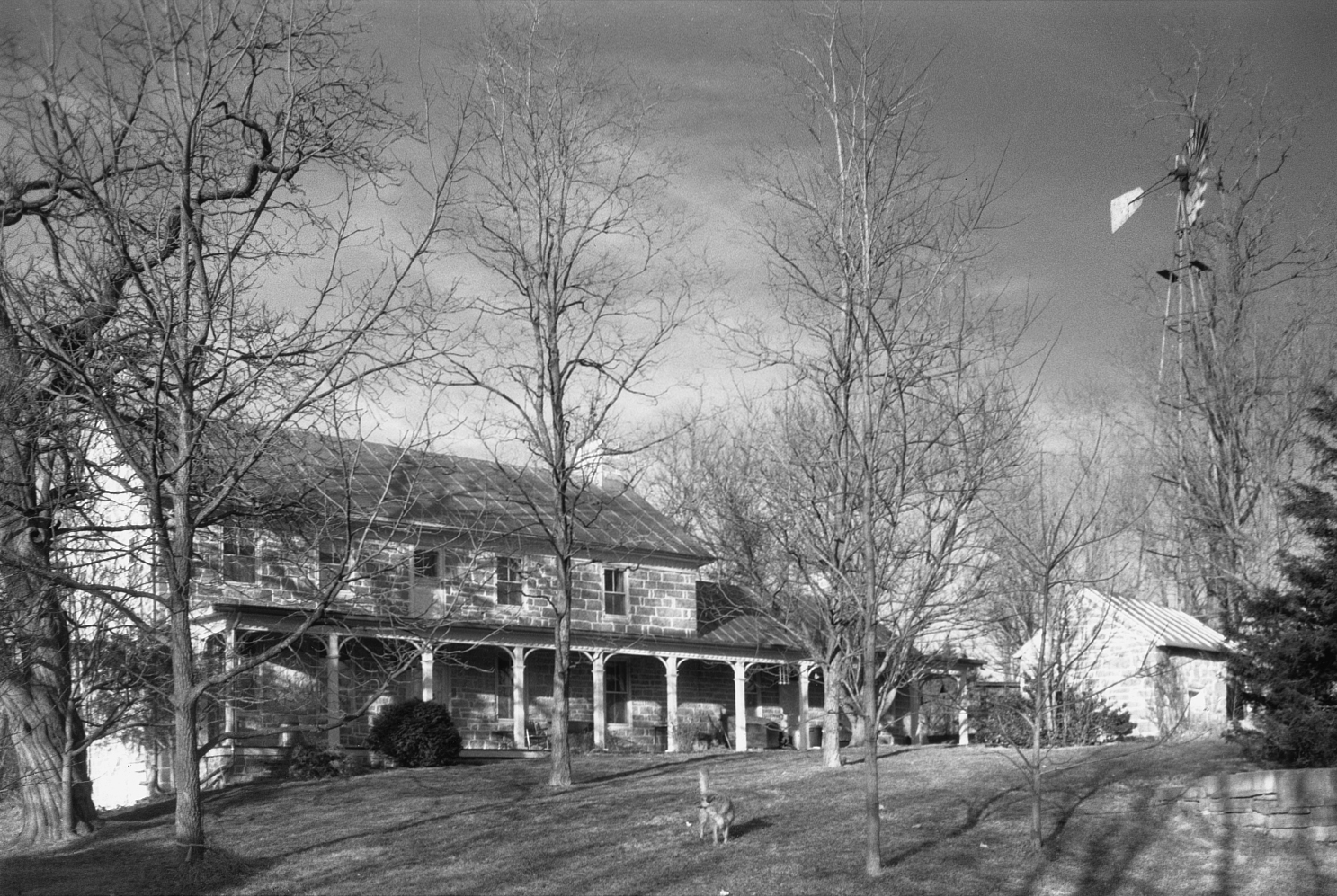
- John K Beery Farm

- Location within Virginia Location within the United States
- Location: North of Harrisonburg off VA 42, near Edom, Virginia
- Coordinates: 38°30′43″N 78°51′33″W
- Area: 120 acres (49 ha)
- Built: 1838
- Built by: Beery, John K.
- NRHP reference No.: 73002058
- VLR No.: 082-0002

Significant dates
- Added to NRHP: September 19, 1973
- Designated VLR: July 17, 1973

John K. Beery Farm is a historic home and farm complex located near Edom, Virginia, United States. The main house dates to 1838, and consists of a two-story, five-bay, central-hall plan, main section with a one-story, three-bay east wing. The main section measures 50 feet wide and 18 feet deep and features a long one-story, late-19th century porch. Also on the property are a number of contributing outbuildings including a stone bank barn, loom house, spring house, wash house / kitchen, granary, sheds, and an outhouse. The meeting room in the east wing of the house served a large congregation of Mennonites for a number of years. John K. Beery was a descendant of Swiss settlers in Pennsylvania.

It was listed on the National Register of Historic Places in 1973.
