= John Kline (elder) =

American church elder (1797–1864)

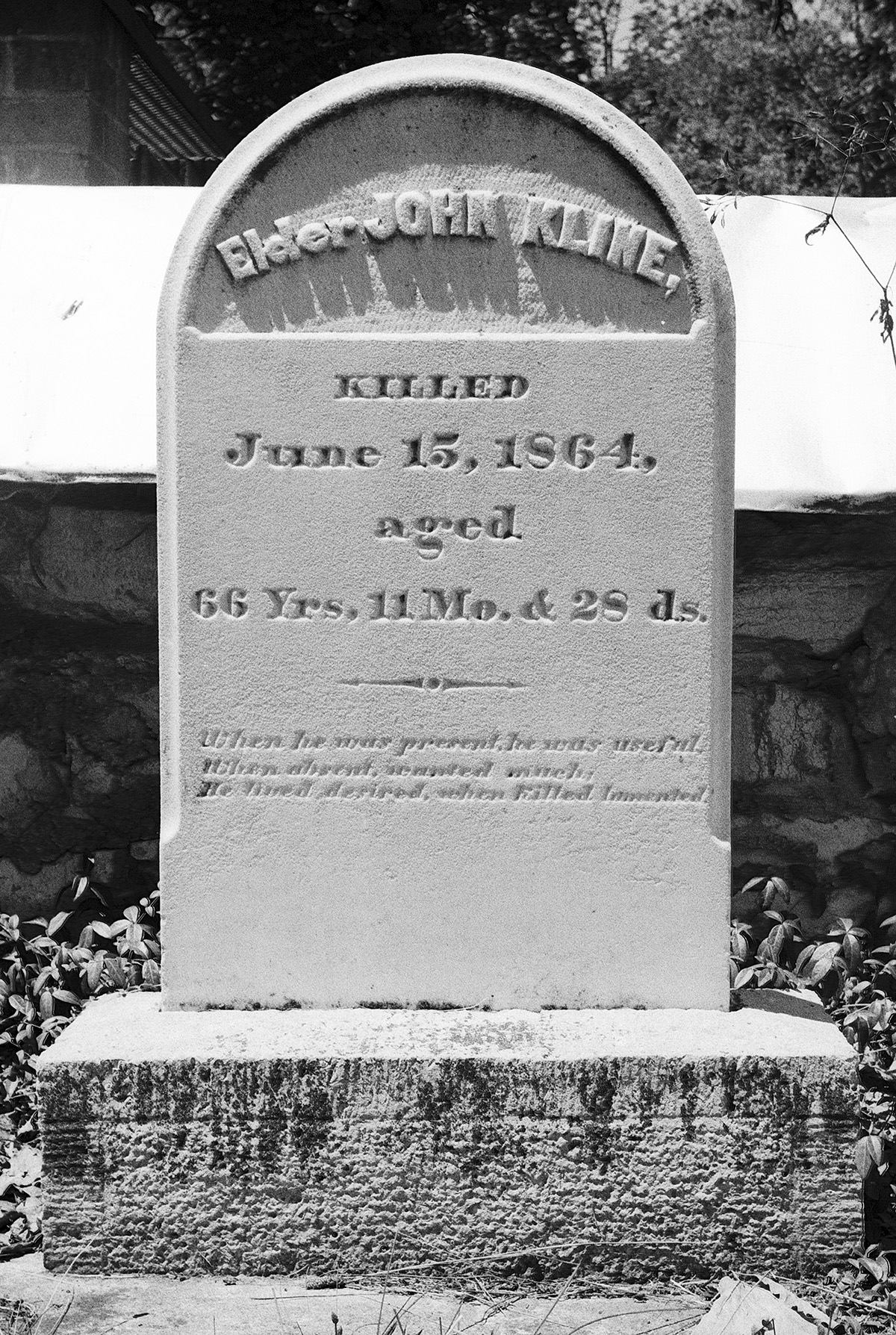
Elder John Kline gravestone, Broadway, Virginia, 1977

Church of the Brethren historian Donald F. Durnbaugh has described John Kline as "arguably the most beloved personality in Brethren History."

Kline was born in Dauphin County, Pennsylvania on 17 June 1797, the son of John Kline (1763–1844) and Mary Hershey Kline (1770–1850). While he was still a boy, the family moved to Rockingham County, Virginia. On 18 March 1818, before he was twenty-one, he married Anna Wampler (1796–1885), the daughter of John Wampler and Magdalene Garber Wampler. He bought a farm on Linville Creek in what is now the town of Broadway, about five miles north of Harrisonburg, Virginia. He and his wife had only one child, a baby daughter, born on 15 March 1819, who did not live and was unnamed.

At some point Kline joined the German Baptist Brethren church. In 1827, he was chosen to serve as deacon by the Linville Creek congregation of the church. He was "called" to the preaching ministry in 1830 and like other Brethren ministers of his day, he served without remuneration throughout his life. At first the Brethren met in members' home or barns or even in open fields, and Kline gave both land and money to build the Linville Creek German Baptist Brethren Church.

He frequently traveled to southwest Virginia and to what is now West Virginia, preaching and baptizing and visiting Brethren families. Sometimes he was able to establish new congregations. The Brethren Encyclopedia says that "according to [Kline's] records, he may have covered as much as 100,000 miles (160,000 km) during his lifetime, mostly on horseback."

Kline also studied and practiced the medical procedures of one Dr. Samuel Thompson of Vermont so that he could treat the sick as well as minister to people spiritually.

At the 1861 Annual Meeting of the church, Kline was elected moderator, the highest elected office of the church, and he was re-elected in each of next three years.

He opposed both slavery and war and when war came between North and South, he lobbied the Virginia legislature and other officials to help make it possible for the Brethren to honor their pacifist beliefs and their objection to participating in the military. He and his good friend and in-law Benjamin F. Moomaw of Botetourt County argued that Brethren farmers could be of more assistance to the Confederate cause by supplying the troops with food than they could by fighting.

During the Civil War Kline crossed Union–Confederate lines to attend church meetings. He was able to obtain passes from both sides (though both were wary of him since he gave medical and spiritual help to both Union and Confederate troops). At one time, suspected of holding Union sympathies, he was imprisoned for two weeks in Virginia.

On 15 June 1864, while returning from a trip north, he was ambushed and killed near his home by young Confederate sympathizers.

His death was deeply mourned; he was widely regarded among his fellow Baptist Brethren as a wise counselor and a highly effective evangelist.

For "Entries of Genealogical Interest, Extracted From Life and Labors of Elder John Kline, the Martyr Missionary, Collated from his Diary by Benjamin Funk click here.
