= Mannheim (Linville, Virginia) =

Historic house in Virginia, United States

- U.S. National Register of Historic Places
- Virginia Landmarks Register
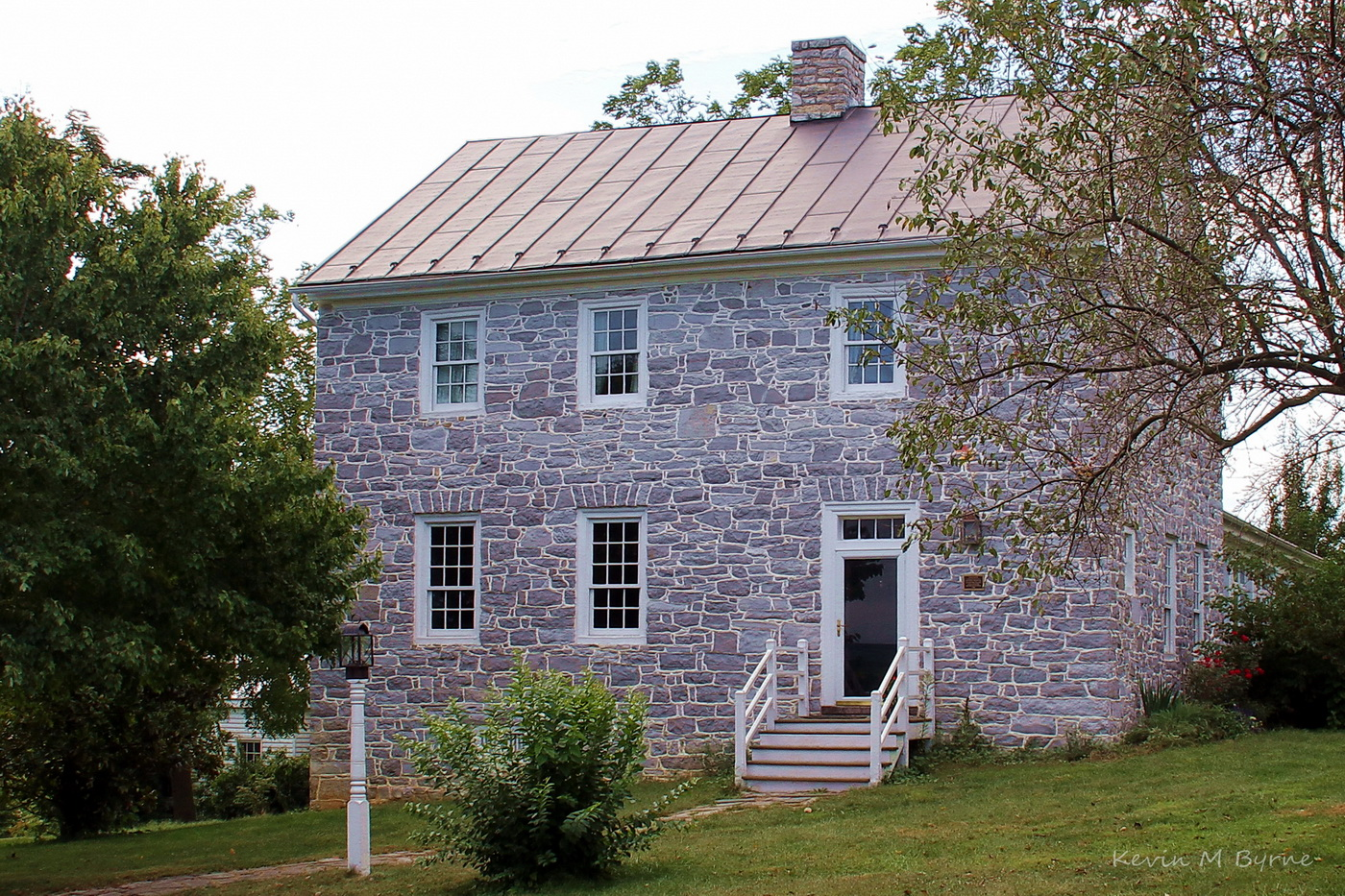

- Location within Virginia Location within the United States
- Location: 4713 Wengers Mill Rd., near Linville, Virginia
- Coordinates: 38°32′45″N 78°51′00″W
- Area: 90 acres (36 ha)
- Built: c. 1788, c. 1855
- Architectural style: Colonial, Greek Revival
- NRHP reference No.: 04000553
- VLR No.: 082-0005

Significant dates
- Added to NRHP: May 27, 2004
- Designated VLR: March 1, 2004

Mannheim, also known as Koffman House, Kauffman House, and Coffman House, is a historic home located near Linville, Rockingham County, Virginia. It was constructed circa 1788 on a 360 acre plantation by David Coffman, a descendant of one of the first German settlers in the Shenandoah Valley. David Coffman named his masterpiece after the German city from which the Coffmans originated. Mannheim is a two-story, three-bay, stone Colonial style dwelling. It has a steep side gable roof with overhanging eaves and a central chimney. A two-story, Greek Revival style wood-frame ell with double porches was added to the rear of the dwelling about 1855. A front porch also added in the 19th century has since been removed. Also on the property are the contributing two brick slave quarters, a log smokehouse, an office, a chicken shed, and the ruins of a stone spring house. The house is representative of vernacular German architecture of the mid-to-late 18th century, as constructed in America.

Mannheim was occupied by successive generations of the Coffman family until 1880. In the mid-1990s Mannheim was purchased by a James Madison University professor who restored it to its 18th-century appearance. It was listed on the National Register of Historic Places in 2004.
