= Baxter House (Edom, Virginia) =

Historic house in Virginia, United States

- U.S. National Register of Historic Places
- Virginia Landmarks Register
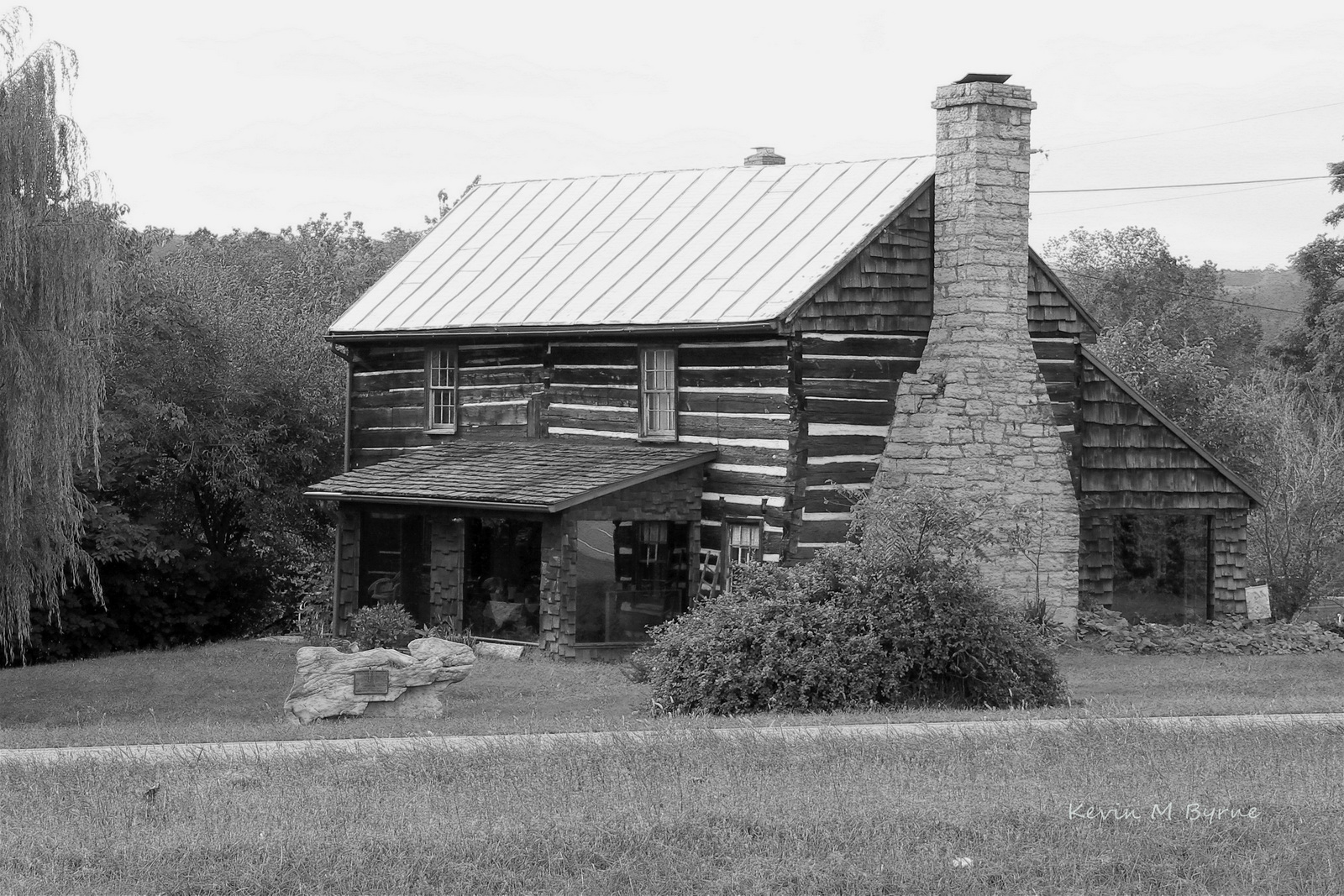

- Location within Virginia Location within the United States
- Location: North of Harrisonburg on VA 42, near Edom, Virginia
- Coordinates: 38°33′20″N 78°50′10″W
- Area: 1.5 acres (0.61 ha)
- Built: c. 1775
- Built by: George Baxter
- Architectural style: Double Pen
- NRHP reference No.: 73002057
- VLR No.: 082-0071

Significant dates
- Added to NRHP: October 3, 1973
- Designated VLR: July 17, 1973

Baxter House is a historic home located near Edom, Rockingham County, Virginia. The house dates to about 1775, and is a single pile, double-pen dwelling consisting of two abutted two-bay, two-story log structures set on limestone foundation. It was built by Scottish settler George Baxter, whose son George A. Baxter served as president of Washington and Lee University from 1799 to 1829.

It was listed on the National Register of Historic Places in 1973.
