= Jesse Bennett =

American physician

- Born: July 13, 1769; Frankford, Philadelphia, Pennsylvania, United States
- Died: July 10, 1842 (aged 72); Mason County, Virginia (now West Virginia)
- Education: Philadelphia College
- Known for: Performing the first Caesarean section in North America, in 1794.
- Spouse: Elizabeth Hogg (m. 1793; died 1830)
- Children: Maria Bennett
- Medical career
- Profession: Physician

Jesse Bennett (July 10, 1769 – July 13, 1842) was the first American medical doctor to perform a successful Caesarean section, which he performed on his own wife at the birth of their only child on January 14, 1794.

== Biography ==
=== Early life ===
Bennett was born in Frankford, Philadelphia, on July 13, 1769. He earned a B.A. Degree at Philadelphia College before apprenticing with Benjamin Rush and attending medical school. In April 1791, he received the title Doctor of Medicine, at the same time he received his M. A. degree. Bennett married Elizabeth Hogg in 1793 and settled in Rockingham County, Virginia, establishing his practice in a log cabin. When Elizabeth became pregnant, Bennett engaged a Dr. Humphrey of Staunton, Virginia, to attend Elizabeth at the delivery.

=== Caesarean section ===
After Elizabeth had endured a prolonged labor, Humphrey and Bennett determined the only options were a Caesarean section on Elizabeth or a craniotomy on the unborn infant. Humphrey refused to do anything, feeling that either operation meant certain death for both the mother and her infant. It appears Humphrey then left the Bennett home.

Desperate to save her child, Elizabeth begged her husband to perform the Caesarian section. Bennett assembled a crude operating table from two boards supported by barrels. Bennett gave his wife laudanum to make her sleepy and had two slaves support her on the table while Elizabeth's sister, Mrs. Hawkins, held a tallow candle to light the makeshift operating table.

Bennett cut his wife's abdomen with a single sweep of his knife and extracted his infant daughter, Maria. He then removed both of Elizabeth's ovaries, saying he'd "not be subjected to such an ordeal again." Finally he sutured the surgical wound with stout linen thread, the kind used in frontier homes to sew heavy clothing.

Elizabeth recovered and was able to be up a month later (see postpartum confinement). Bennett declared his wife healed as of March 1, 1794, writing a cryptic case history on the title page of one of his medical books. Elizabeth Bennett lived for thirty-six more years, dying on April 20, 1830. Maria Bennett lived until 1870, married twice, and bore six children.

Bennett refused to publicize the details of the surgery during his life. He said other doctors would never believe that a woman could survive this hazardous operation, done in the backwoods of Virginia, and he was "damned if he'd give them a chance to call him a liar."

The Bennetts moved to West Virginia and Dr. Bennett started a large practice there.

Because Bennett didn't report the operation during his life, it was long believed the first successful American Caesarian section had been performed in 1827 by John Lambert in Ohio - coincidentally, only ten miles from Bennett's practice.

A. L. Knight, a boyhood neighbor of the Bennetts, remembered hearing the details of Maria's birth when he was a youth. Knight collected eye-witness testimonies from Mrs. Hawkins and the surviving African-American slaves after Bennett's death and published the story in The Southern Historical Magazine in 1892 as part of "The Life and Times of Dr. Jesse Bennett, M.D."

=== Later life ===
Bennett became active in civic affairs in the newly formed Mason County (now Mason County, West Virginia). He was appointed Major of the Mason County Militia in 1804 and represented Mason County in the Virginia Assembly.

Aaron Burr reportedly tried to enlist Bennett's help with the Burr conspiracy for which Burr was charged with treason. Bennett refused to assist Aaron Burr and went on to serve the United States as an Army Surgeon in the War of 1812.

== Memorials ==
Bennett's accomplishment is noted in two historical markers, one (calling him "Jessee Bennett") erected in 1983 by Virginia near the site of the operation in Edom and one erected by West Virginia, in 1973, near the site of his original burial. He was initially interred in the Bennett-Knopp Cemetery in Point Pleasant, West Virginia; his remains, along with those of his wife and a friend, were moved, with their original marker, to that town's Pioneer Cemetery in 1985.
