= Ely Mound =

Archaeological site in Virginia, United States

- U.S. National Register of Historic Places
- Virginia Landmarks Register
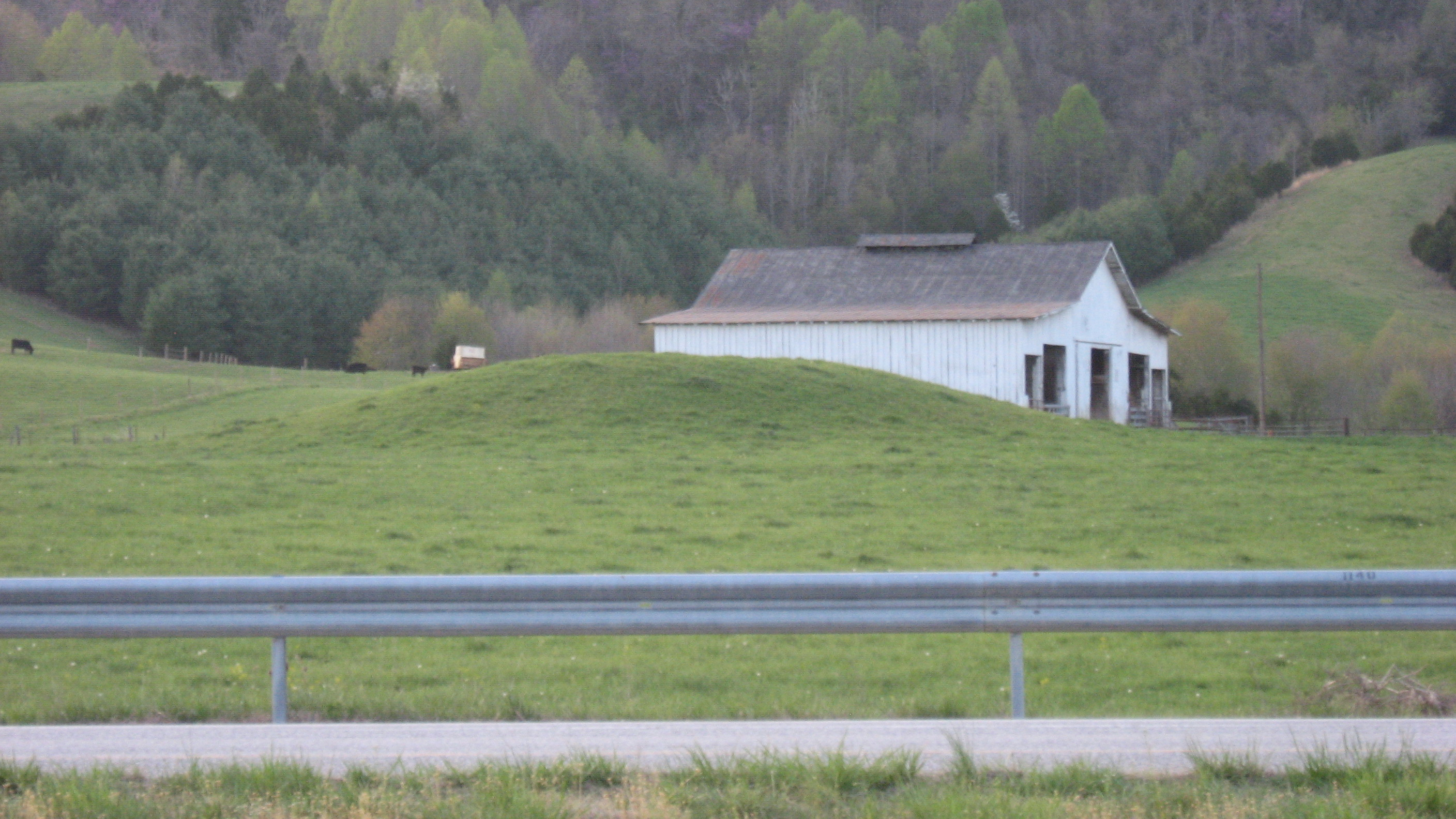
- Southern side, viewed from U.S. Route 58
- Nearest city: Rose Hill, Virginia
- Area: 14 acres (5.7 ha)
- NRHP reference No.: 83003287
- VLR No.: 052-0018

Significant dates
- Added to NRHP: July 28, 1983
- Designated VLR: April 19, 1983

Ely Mound is a historic burial mound located near Rose Hill, Lee County, Virginia. It is considered the best-preserved Mississippian culture site in Virginia. The mound dates to the Late Woodland-Mississippian Period (AD 1200–1650), during which more complex societies and practices evolved, including chiefdoms and religious ceremonies. Often, temples, elite residences, and council buildings stood atop substructure or townhouse mounds such as Ely Mound. (Decaying cedar posts remained in the ground in the late 1800s, and were frequently struck by plows.) Lucien Carr, assistant curator of the Peabody Museum of Archaeology and Ethnology in Boston, led an excavation here in 1877. At that time, the mound measured 300 feet in circumference, and 19 feet in height. Excavation lasted a little over two weeks, with skeletons, pottery, and arrowheads of white flint being unearthed. One man was killed within a few feet of the bottom of the mound when the shaft he had been digging in collapsed. Several other men were injured. The mound has remained undisturbed until a 2019 excavation led by Maureen Meyers, a professor at the University of Mississippi.

It was listed on the National Register of Historic Places in 1983.
