= National Register of Historic Places listings in Rockingham County, Virginia =

Location of Rockingham County in Virginia

This is a list of the National Register of Historic Places listings in Rockingham County, Virginia.

It is intended to be a complete list of the properties and districts on the National Register of Historic Places in Rockingham County, Virginia, United States. The locations of National Register properties and districts for which latitude and longitude coordinates are provided below may be viewed on an online map.

There are 45 properties and districts listed on the National Register in the county, including 1 National Historic Landmark.

This National Park Service list is complete through NPS recent listings posted September 25, 2026.

== Current listings ==
	Name on the Register	Image	Date listed	Location	City or town	Description
1	Baxter House	Baxter House	October 3, 1973 (#73002057)	North of Harrisonburg on State Route 42; 38°33′21″N 78°50′09″W	Edom	
2	John K. Beery Farm	John K. Beery Farm	September 19, 1973 (#73002058)	North of Harrisonburg off State Route 42; 38°31′08″N 78°51′31″W	Edom	
3	Bethlehem Church	Bethlehem Church	June 27, 1985 (#85001414)	Tenth Legion Rd. 38°34′39″N 78°43′56″W	Broadway	
4	Big Run Quarry Site		December 13, 1985 (#85003177)	Address Restricted	Luray	
5	Bogota	Bogota	March 25, 2009 (#09000162)	5375 Lynnwood Rd. 38°19′03″N 78°46′27″W	Port Republic	
6	Bon Air	Bon Air	May 2, 2007 (#07000399)	2477 Bear Lithia Rd. 38°26′10″N 78°37′08″W	Elkton	
7	Breneman-Turner Mill	Breneman-Turner Mill	April 20, 2006 (#06000325)	5036 Turners Mill Ln. 38°31′30″N 78°52′30″W	Harrisonburg	
8	Bridgewater Historic District	Bridgewater Historic District	November 1, 1984 (#84000477)	Roughly Main St. from the North River to Crawford Ave., and E. College, Gravel Lane, and Bank St. 38°22′56″N 78°58′36″W	Bridgewater	
9	Cave Hill Farm	Cave Hill Farm	November 18, 2011 (#11000839)	9780 Cave Hill Rd. 38°21′34″N 78°43′18″W	McGaheysville	
10	George Chrisman House	George Chrisman House	December 1, 2006 (#06001099)	5341 Shaver Mill Rd. 38°32′42″N 78°52′04″W	Linville	
11	Contentment	Contentment	May 19, 2004 (#04000481)	253 Contentment Ln. 38°20′32″N 78°56′06″W	Mount Crawford	
12	Dayton Historic District	Dayton Historic District	August 16, 1984 (#84003590)	Roughly bounded by Main, Mason, Walnut, Summit, and Bowman Sts. 38°24′58″N 78°56′27″W	Dayton	
13	Deering Hall	Deering Hall	August 25, 2020 (#100005530)	140 North Main St. 38°36′51″N 78°47′55″W	Broadway	
14	David and Catherine Driver Farm	David and Catherine Driver Farm	May 8, 2007 (#07000415)	3796 Long Meadow Dr. 38°37′20″N 78°45′18″W	Timberville	
15	Edom Store and Post Office	Edom Store and Post Office	July 24, 2007 (#07000768)	5375 Jesse Bennett Way; 38°31′31″N 78°51′36″W	Edom	
16	Elkton Historic District		October 26, 2023 (#100009529)	Generally bounded by C Street and Gibbons Avenue to the north, North Stuart Avenue to the east, Wirt and Water Street to the south, and Shenandoah Avenue and 1st Street to the west 38°24′29″N 78°37′24″W	Elkton	
17	Joseph Funk House	Joseph Funk House	February 24, 1975 (#75002036)	Singers Glen Rd. 38°33′04″N 78°55′03″W	Singers Glen	
18	Harnsberger Farm	Harnsberger Farm	January 22, 1992 (#91001974)	Junction of Point and Rinacas Corner Rds. 38°28′35″N 78°38′08″W	Shenandoah	
19	Stephen Harnsberger House	Stephen Harnsberger House	July 8, 1982 (#82004593)	Holly Ave. 38°16′31″N 78°49′48″W	Grottoes	
20	Daniel Harrison House	Daniel Harrison House	July 24, 1973 (#73002056)	Northeast of Dayton on State Route 42; 38°25′05″N 78°56′09″W	Dayton	
21	Haugh House	Haugh House	August 18, 2011 (#11000552)	6529 State Route 253; 38°21′05″N 78°49′27″W	Port Republic	
22	Inglewood	Inglewood	May 30, 1985 (#85001172)	Kratzler Rd. 38°28′51″N 78°50′43″W	Harrisonburg	
23	Kite Mansion	Kite Mansion	February 13, 2007 (#07000049)	17271 U.S. Route 33; 38°24′12″N 78°36′15″W	Elkton	
24	Kyle's Mill House	Kyle's Mill House	March 6, 2001 (#01000142)	1764 Cross Keys Rd. 38°22′20″N 78°49′37″W	Harrisonburg	
25	Lincoln Homestead and Cemetery	Lincoln Homestead and Cemetery	December 5, 1972 (#72001414)	South of the junction of State Route 42 and Klines Mill Rd. 38°33′32″N 78°50′04″W	Broadway	
26	Linville Creek Bridge	Linville Creek Bridge	April 15, 1978 (#78003042)	South of Broadway on Springbrook Rd. 38°36′23″N 78°48′11″W	Broadway	
27	Long Meadow	Long Meadow	June 1, 2005 (#05000528)	2525 Fridleys Gap Rd. 38°30′55″N 78°44′34″W	Harrisonburg	
28	Longs Chapel	Longs Chapel	November 15, 2006 (#06001042)	1334B Fridleys Gap Rd. 38°30′46″N 78°45′46″W	Harrisonburg	
29	Mannheim (082-0005)	Mannheim (082-0005)	May 27, 2004 (#04000553)	4713 Wengers Mill Rd. 38°32′53″N 78°50′50″W	Linville	
30	Massanetta Springs Historic District	Massanetta Springs Historic District	May 26, 2005 (#05000477)	712 Massanetta Springs Rd. 38°24′03″N 78°50′10″W	Harrisonburg	
31	Melrose Caverns and Harrison Farmstead	Melrose Caverns and Harrison Farmstead	May 14, 2014 (#14000237)	6639 N. U.S. Route 11; 38°31′02″N 78°47′25″W	Harrisonburg	
32	Miller-Kite House	Miller-Kite House	February 1, 1979 (#79003083)	302 Rockingham St. 38°24′32″N 78°36′57″W	Elkton	Headquarters of Confederate General Stonewall Jackson during the Shenandoah Valley Campaign of the American Civil War
33	Mount Crawford Historic District		October 1, 2026 (#100013487)	Main Street (Rt 11), Mill Street, Old Bridgewater Road; 38°21′24″N 78°56′31″W	Mount Crawford	
34	Paul's Ottobine Mill	Paul's Ottobine Mill	June 12, 2017 (#100001083)	8061 Judge Paul Rd. 38°25′44″N 79°02′15″W	Dayton	
35	Peter Paul House	Peter Paul House	December 28, 1979 (#79003082)	North of Dayton on Silver Lake Rd. 38°25′48″N 78°56′19″W	Dayton	
36	Jonathan Peale House	Jonathan Peale House	November 1, 2007 (#07001144)	67 Cross Keys Rd. 38°23′31″N 78°48′39″W	Harrisonburg	
37	Plains Mill	Plains Mill	May 19, 2014 (#14000238)	14767 Plains Mill Rd. 38°38′49″N 78°43′14″W	Timberville	
38	Port Republic Historic District	Port Republic Historic District	September 8, 1980 (#80004224)	State Route 253 and Main St. 38°17′39″N 78°48′56″W	Port Republic	
39	Silver Lake Historic District	Silver Lake Historic District	May 22, 2019 (#100003978)	Silver Lake and Linhoss Rds. 38°25′20″N 78°56′24″W	Dayton	
40	Singers Glen Historic District	Singers Glen Historic District	January 20, 1978 (#78003043)	Junction of Green Hill and Singers Glen Rds. 38°33′09″N 78°54′50″W	Singers Glen	
41	Sites House	Sites House	April 3, 1979 (#79003081)	Southwest of Broadway off Sunset Dr. 38°35′40″N 78°49′40″W	Broadway	
42	Skyline Drive Historic District	Skyline Drive Historic District	April 28, 1997 (#97001112)	Shenandoah National Park, from the northern entrance station at Front Royal to the southern entrance station at the Rockfish Gap; 38°22′03″N 78°32′12″W	Luray	
43	Taylor Springs	Taylor Springs	June 6, 2002 (#02000621)	3712 Taylor Spring Ln. 38°23′40″N 78°50′18″W	Harrisonburg	
44	Timberville Historic District	Timberville Historic District	January 2, 2013 (#12001137)	Bounded by Main, Bellevue, Montevideo, High, Church, and S. C Sts., and Maple Ave. 38°38′20″N 78°46′24″W	Timberville	
45	Tunker House	Tunker House	July 2, 1971 (#71000989)	South of central Broadway on Lindsay Ave. 38°36′16″N 78°47′54″W	Broadway	

== See also ==
- List of National Historic Landmarks in Virginia
- National Register of Historic Places listings in Virginia
- National Register of Historic Places listings in Harrisonburg, Virginia
