= Long Meadow =

Long Meadow(s) or Long Meadow Farm may refer to:

== United Kingdom ==
- Long Meadow, Cambridgeshire

== United States ==
- Long Meadow Hill, a neighborhood in Brookfield, Connecticut
- Long Meadows, a historic home near Hagerstown, Maryland
- Longmeadow, Massachusetts
  - Longmeadow Historic District, Longmeadow, Massachusetts
- Long Meadow Farm (Schwenksville, Pennsylvania), a historic home and barn in New Hanover Township, Montgomery County, Pennsylvania
- Long Meadow (Surgoinsville, Tennessee), a historic house in Hawkins County, Tennessee
- Long Meadow (Harrisonburg, Virginia), a historic home
- Long Meadow (Middletown, Virginia), a historic home
- Long Meadow (Winchester, Virginia), a historic home
