= Port Republic =

Port Republic may refer to a location in the United States:

- Port Republic, Maryland
- Port Republic, New Jersey
- Port Republic, Virginia
  - Battle of Port Republic, American Civil War battle fought in Rockingham County, Virginia
