= Charles E. Fahrney =

American politician

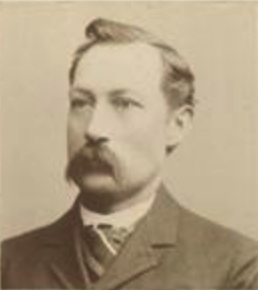

Member of the Virginia House of Delegates from Rockingham County
- In office December 2, 1891 – December 4, 1895

Personal details
- Born: July 11, 1851 Maryland, U.S.
- Died: April 5, 1917 (aged 65) Timberville, Virginia, U.S.
- Party: Democratic
- Spouse: Mary Frances McInturff

Charles E. Fahrney (July 11, 1851 – April 5, 1917) was an American politician who served in the Virginia House of Delegates.
