= David and Catherine Driver Farm =

- U.S. National Register of Historic Places
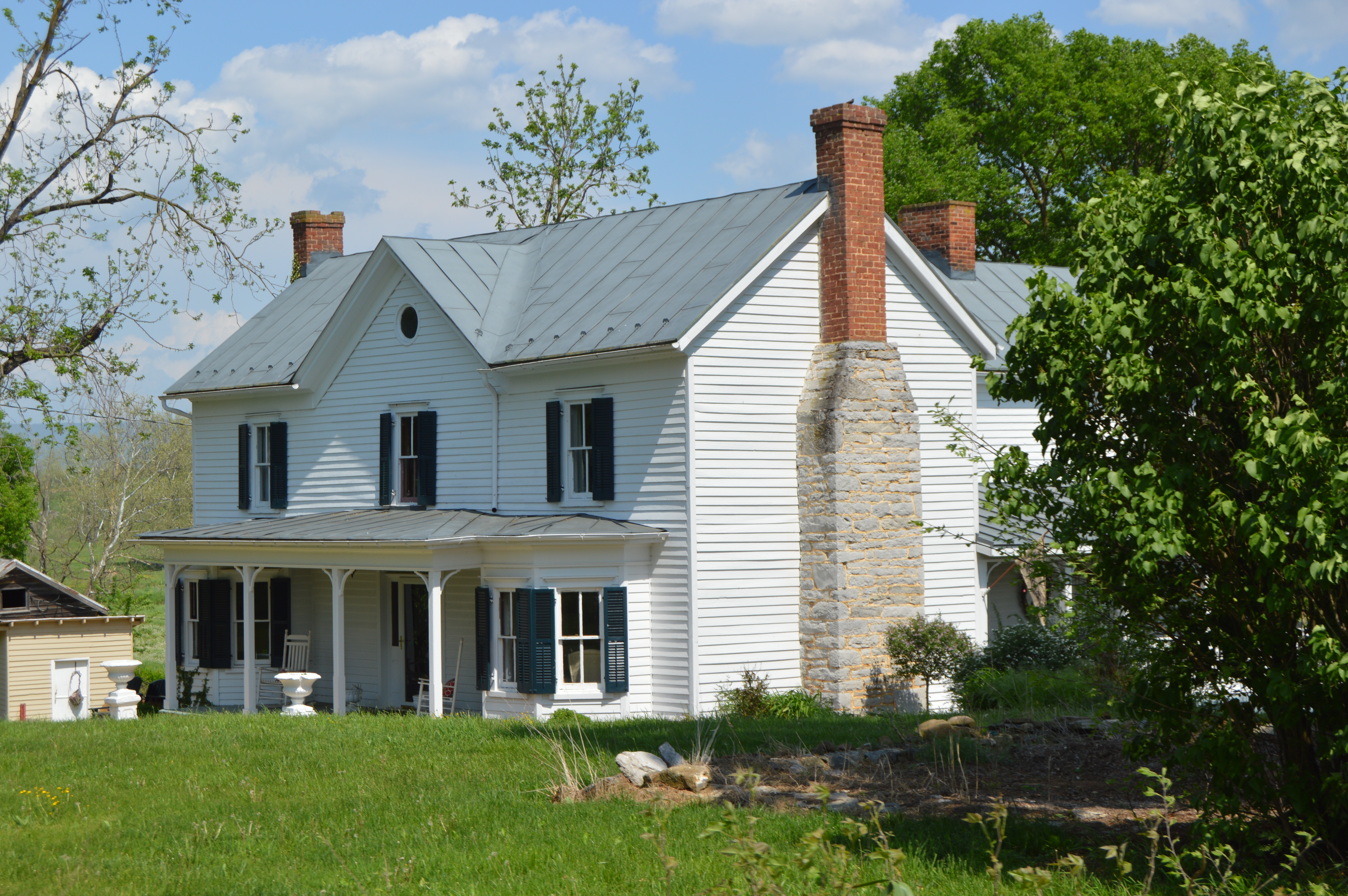
- Front and southwestern side

- Location within Virginia Location within the United States
- Location: 3796 Long Meadow Drive, Timberville, Virginia
- Coordinates: 38.614208°N 78.745197°W
- Area: 82.3 acres (33.3 ha)
- Built: 1839
- Architectural style: Greek Revival, Late Victorian
- NRHP reference No.: 07000415
- Added to NRHP: May 8, 2007

The David and Catherine Driver Farm is a historic farmstead in rural Rockingham County, Virginia, near Timberville. The main house, a 2 1/2-story wood-frame structure, was built c. 1845 and has Greek Revival styling. It was extended in the 1880s, giving it a T-shape and adding Victorian details such as bull's eye window in the front gable. The farm's most notable building is a c. 1839 barn, a rare survivor of the Valley Campaigns of 1864 through the area, in which the Union Army under General Philip Sheridan destroyed most barns.

The farm was listed on the National Register of Historic Places in 2007.

== See also ==
- National Register of Historic Places listings in Rockingham County, Virginia
