= Plains Mill =

- U.S. National Register of Historic Places
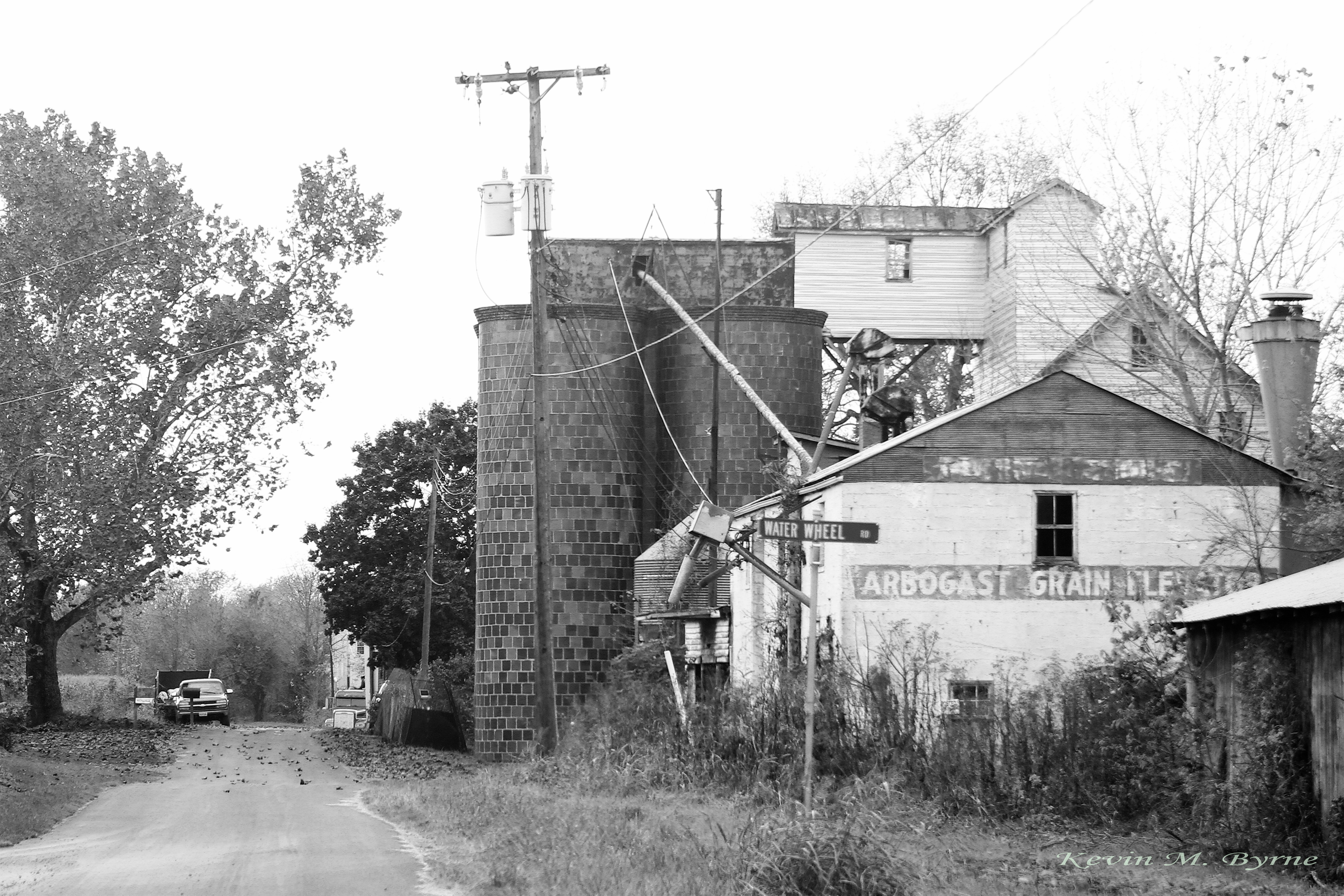
- The mill in 2013

- Location within Virginia Location within the United States
- Location: 14767 Plains Mill Rd., near Timberville, Virginia
- Coordinates: 38°38′55″N 78°42′26″W
- Area: 1 acre (0.40 ha)
- Built: 1847
- Architectural style: Federal
- NRHP reference No.: 14000238
- Added to NRHP: May 19, 2014

Plains Mill is a historic mill complex at 14767 Plains Mill Road near the town of Timberville in rural Rockingham County, Virginia, USA. The mill building is a two-story wood-frame construction, built between 1847 and 1849, on the banks of the North Fork Shenandoah River, where a stream falls over the bank into the river, providing the mill's power. The building has been sheathed in metal siding, although its original weatherboard siding remains underneath. A set of grain bins were added to the south side of the building in 1923, and a two-story wing was added to the north after World War II. The mill was in continuous use from its construction until 1994, encapsulating the evolutionary history of mill development in that time.

The mill and a c. 1959 office building were listed on the National Register of Historic Places in 2014.

== See also ==
- National Register of Historic Places listings in Rockingham County, Virginia
