= Port Republic Historic District =

Port Republic Historic District may refer to:

- Port Republic Historic District (Port Republic, New Jersey)
- Port Republic Historic District (Port Republic, Virginia)
- Port Republic Road Historic District, Waynesboro, Virginia
