= Paul's Ottobine Mill =

- U.S. National Register of Historic Places
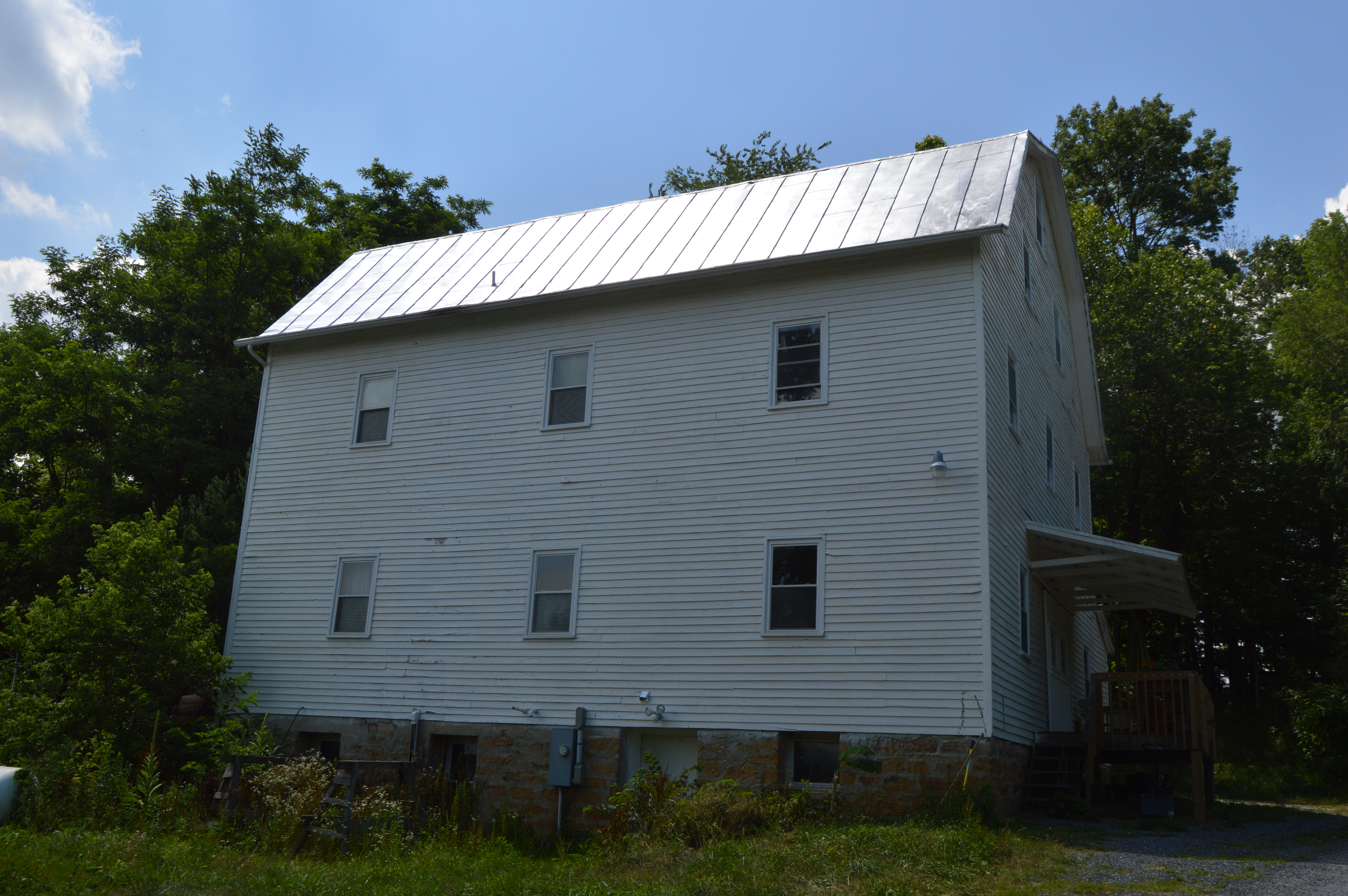

- Location within Virginia Location within the United States
- Location: 8061 Judge Paul Rd., near Dayton, Virginia
- Coordinates: 38°25′44″N 79°2′15″W
- Area: less than one acre
- Built: 1937
- NRHP reference No.: 100001083
- Added to NRHP: June 12, 2017

Paul's Ottobine Mill is a historic former mill building at 8061 Judge Paul Road in rural Rockingham County, Virginia, west of Dayton. It is a two-story gambrel-roofed frame building, constructed in 1937-38 on the foundation of an older mill. The site has an industrial history dating to 1799, and portions of the older water control channels are still evident. The building, now converted to residential use, retains a suite of historic mill equipment in its interior.

The mill was listed on the National Register of Historic Places in 2017.

== See also ==
- National Register of Historic Places listings in Rockingham County, Virginia
