= Camp Massanetta =

Coordinates: 38.4018°N 78.8354°W

- U.S. Historic district – Contributing property
- Location within Virginia Location within the United States
- Location: 712 Massanetta Springs Rd., Harrisonburg, Virginia
- Built: 1955-1956
- Built by: Fred Betts
- Architect: W. Glen Wallace
- Part of: Massanetta Springs Historic District (ID05000477)
- Added to NRHP: May 26, 2005

Massanetta Springs Camp & Conference Center is a Presbyterian camp and conference center in Harrisonburg, Virginia. The ministry of Massanetta Springs is divided into three areas. Guest services, Conference Ministries, and Camp Massanetta. The camp features archery ranges, hiking trails, four residential camper villages, a pool, lake, picnic pavilion, auditorium/cafeteria, camp office, ropes course, and nurses station. The Massanetta Springs Conference Center and Historic Hotel are also located on these 200 acres (0.81 km^{2}).

Camp Massanetta began in 1956, however the residential camping program was suspended in November 2008 and a new direction sought. Mission@Massanetta provides youth and adults an opportunity to do mission in a variety of arenas within Harrisonburg, Rockingham County, and Augusta County. The "Brainy Camps" are camps for children and teens with Tourette syndrome, Asperger syndrome, neurofibromatosis, or epilepsy. The Children's National Medical Center in Washington, DC provides the camps and interest has been expressed in expanding to include children and teens with obesity issues and those with facial anomalies (cleft palate, etc.). Varsity football and marching band camps are also hosted at Camp Massanetta.

In May 2005, Massanetta Springs Historic District was listed in the National Register of Historic Places.

== Middle School Conference ==
Since 1993, Massanetta Springs has hosted the Massanetta Springs Middle School Conferences, Christian summer youth events for completed 6th-8th graders. The four conferences are attended by more than a thousand youth from youth groups around the country. Although the conference is geared toward Presbyterian youth, the event is open to all denominational backgrounds. The conference includes workshops for youth led by Youth Pastors and lay leaders from around the country, as well as recreation and music events.
