= Cave Hill Farm =

Historic farm in Virginia, US

- U.S. National Register of Historic Places
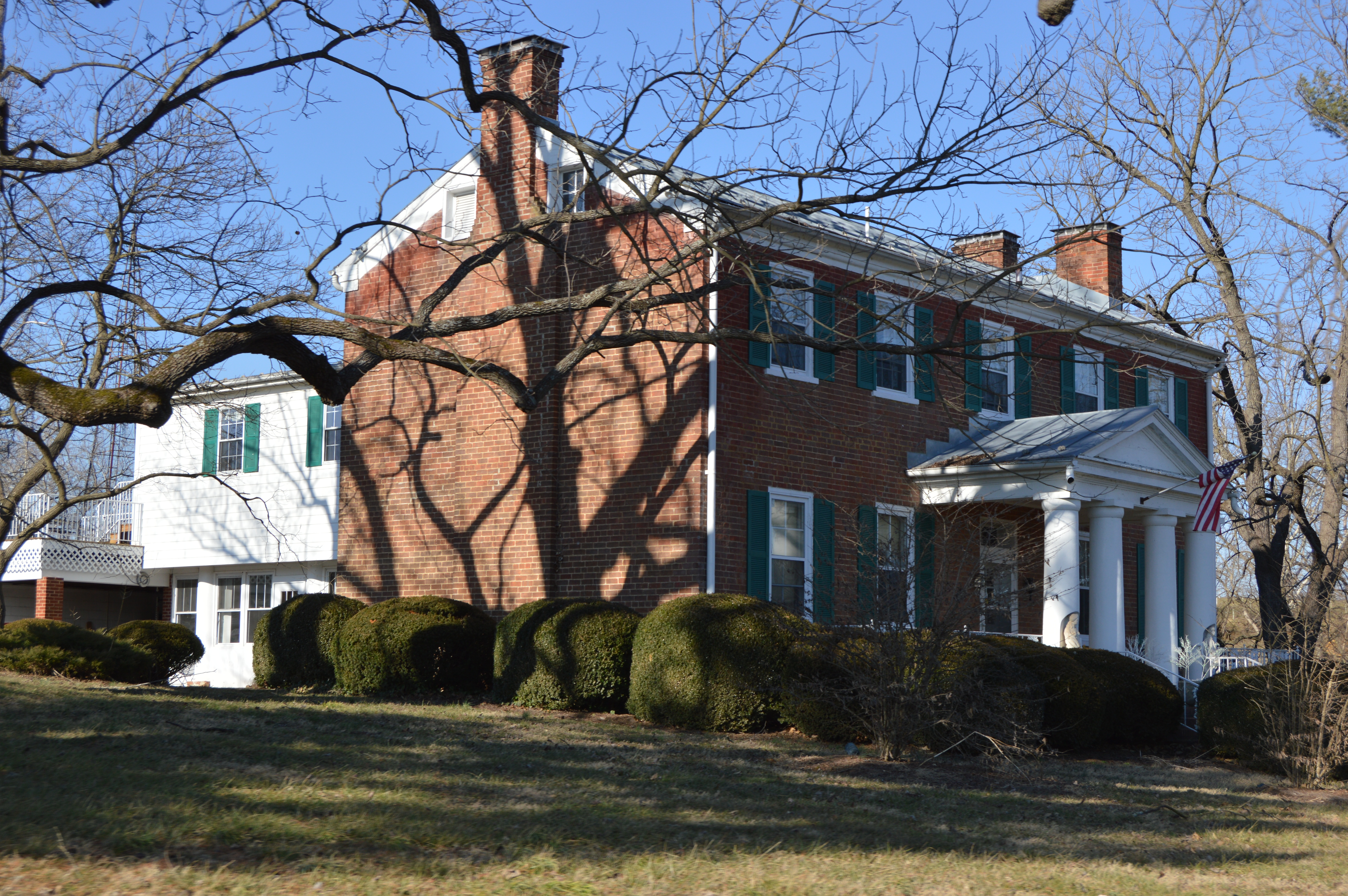
- Front and western side of the farmhouse

- Location within Virginia Location within the United States
- Location: 9875 Cave Hill Road, McGaheysville, Virginia
- Coordinates: 38°21′34″N 78°43′16″W
- Area: 158 acres (64 ha)
- Built: c. 1847
- Architectural style: Federal, Greek Revival
- NRHP reference No.: 11000839
- Added to NRHP: November 18, 2011

Cave Hill Farm is a historical farm at 9780 Cave Hill Road in McGaheysville, Virginia. The centerpiece of the farm is its main house, a two-story brick house with Federal and Greek Revival characteristics. The farm is named for a cave that is located on a limestone outcrop on the north side of Cave Hill Road. It is the source of a spring on the property, and was historically used for food storage. Since 1868 the property has been in the hands of Mann family descendants, the Hopkins, who operate a bed and breakfast inn.

The farm was listed on the National Register of Historic Places in 2011.

== See also ==
- National Register of Historic Places listings in Rockingham County, Virginia
