= Timberville Historic District =

Archaeological site in Virginia, United States

- U.S. National Register of Historic Places
- U.S. Historic district
- Virginia Landmarks Register
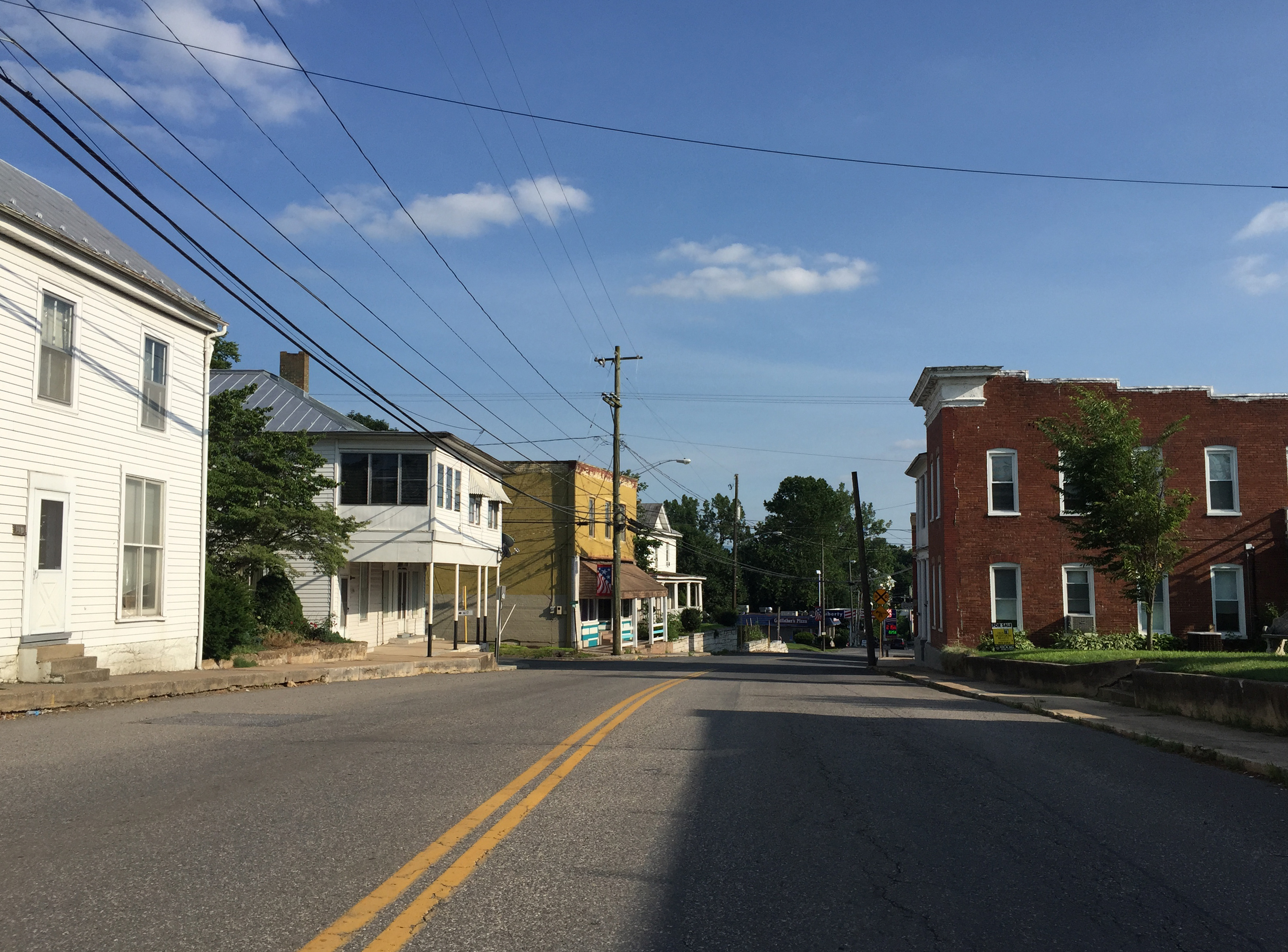
- Downtown Timberville

- Location within Virginia Location within the United States
- Location: Bounded by Main, Bellevue, Montevideo, High, Church & S. C Sts., Maple Ave., Timberville, Virginia
- Coordinates: 38°38′20″N 78°46′22″W
- Area: 118 acres (48 ha)
- Built: c. 1750
- NRHP reference No.: 12001137
- VLR No.: 312-5007

Significant dates
- Added to NRHP: January 2, 2013
- Designated VLR: September 20, 2012

The Timberville Historic District encompasses the historic center of the small town of Timberville, Virginia, which straddles the North Fork of the Shenandoah River in Rockingham County. Although the area was settled in the mid-18th century (the oldest surviving house dates to c. 1750), the area did not develop economically until after the arrival of the railroad in 1868. The area saw significant development in the early 20th century, developing a commercial center north of the river. Businesses migrated south of the river in the mid-20th century, and the area's economy declined in the 1960s. The district includes a number of Italianate commercial buildings, a streamlined Moderne gas station, and housing in a wide variety of styles dating from the 18th to 20th centuries.

The district was listed on the National Register of Historic Places in 2013.
