= Taylor Springs (Harrisonburg, Virginia) =

Historic house in Virginia, United States

- U.S. National Register of Historic Places
- Virginia Landmarks Register
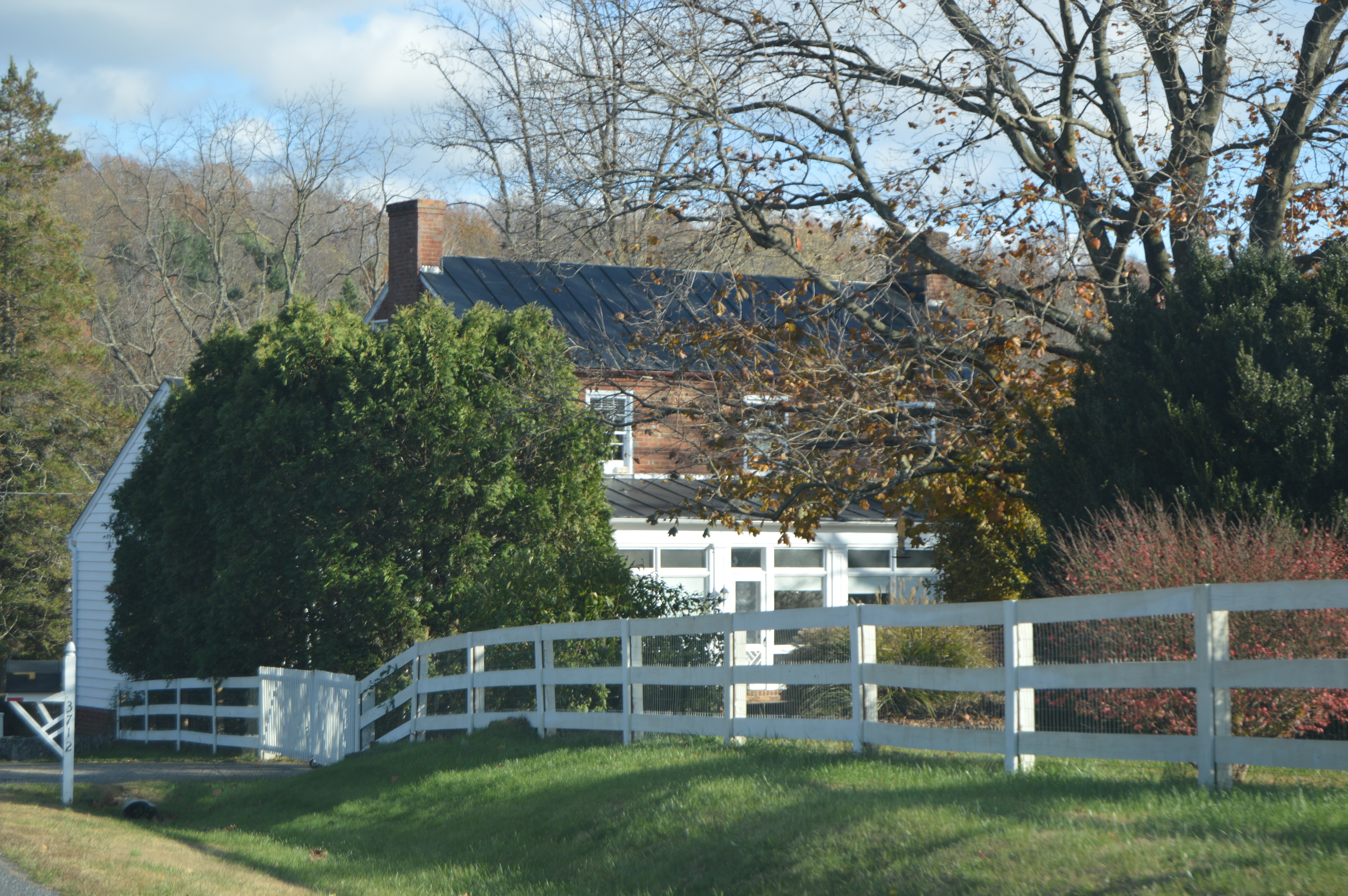
- Rear of the house

- Location within Virginia Location within the United States
- Location: 3712 Taylor Spring Ln., near Harrisonburg, Virginia
- Coordinates: 38°23′39.5″N 78°50′18.5″W
- Area: 3.1 acres (1.3 ha)
- Built: c. 1850
- Architect: Joe Nielson
- NRHP reference No.: 02000621
- VLR No.: 082-0635

Significant dates
- Added to NRHP: June 6, 2002
- Designated VLR: March 13, 2002

Taylor Springs, also known as Taylor Springs Mill, is a historic home located near Harrisonburg, Rockingham County, Virginia. It was built about 1850, and is a two-story, five-bay, brick I-house dwelling with a gable roof. Significant additions were made to the dwelling and the front porch reconstructed in the 1940s. Also on the property are the limestone spring house (1940); a frame office or kitchen that has an exterior end chimney; and a relocated frame storage shed that used to be the kitchen wing to the house.

It was listed on the National Register of Historic Places in 2002.
