= Port Republic, Virginia =

Port Republic
- Census-designated place
- Location of the Port Republic CDP within Rockingham County

- Location in Virginia Port Republic (the United States)
- Coordinates: 38°17′21″N 78°48′48″W
- Country: United States
- State: Virginia
- County: Rockingham
- Established: 1802

Area
  - Total: 5.94 km^{2} (2.29 sq mi)
  - Land: 5.79 km^{2} (2.24 sq mi)
  - Water: 0.15 km^{2} (0.058 sq mi)

Population (1832)
  - Total: 160
  - Density: 28/km^{2} (72/sq mi)
- FIPS code: 51-63896
- GNIS feature ID: 2807441

Port Republic is a census-designated place in Rockingham County, Virginia, United States. As of the 2020 census, Port Republic had a population of 408. The Battle of Port Republic took place there during the Civil War.

== History ==
Port Republic was chartered as a town in 1802, at the confluence of the South River and the North River, which join to form the South Fork of the Shenandoah River. This point was the head of navigation on this branch of the Shenandoah, and influenced the town's commercial and strategic importance.

By 1832 the town had a population of 160 people. Many mills were built there, the first one in 1745, because of the availability of water power, and the proximity to water transportation to the northern Shenandoah Valley and the Potomac River. The Battle of Port Republic in June 1862 during Stonewall Jackson's Shenandoah Valley Campaign in the American Civil War centered on Port Republic.

After the Civil War, Port Republic remained a locus of commerce and industry, with two iron foundries in operation by 1866. Artifacts and documents of the town's founding and history are preserved at a museum in the town.

Bogota, Haugh House, and Port Republic Historic District are listed on the National Register of Historic Places.

James Madison, the first bishop of the Diocese of Virginia of The Episcopal Church in the United States, was born in Port Republic in 1749. Not to be confused with his cousin (also named), James Madison, who became the 4th President of the United States.

== Demographics ==
Port Republic first appeared as a census designated place in the 2020 U.S. census.
