= Port Republic Historic District (Port Republic, Virginia) =

Historic district in Virginia, United States

- U.S. National Register of Historic Places
- U.S. Historic district
- Virginia Landmarks Register
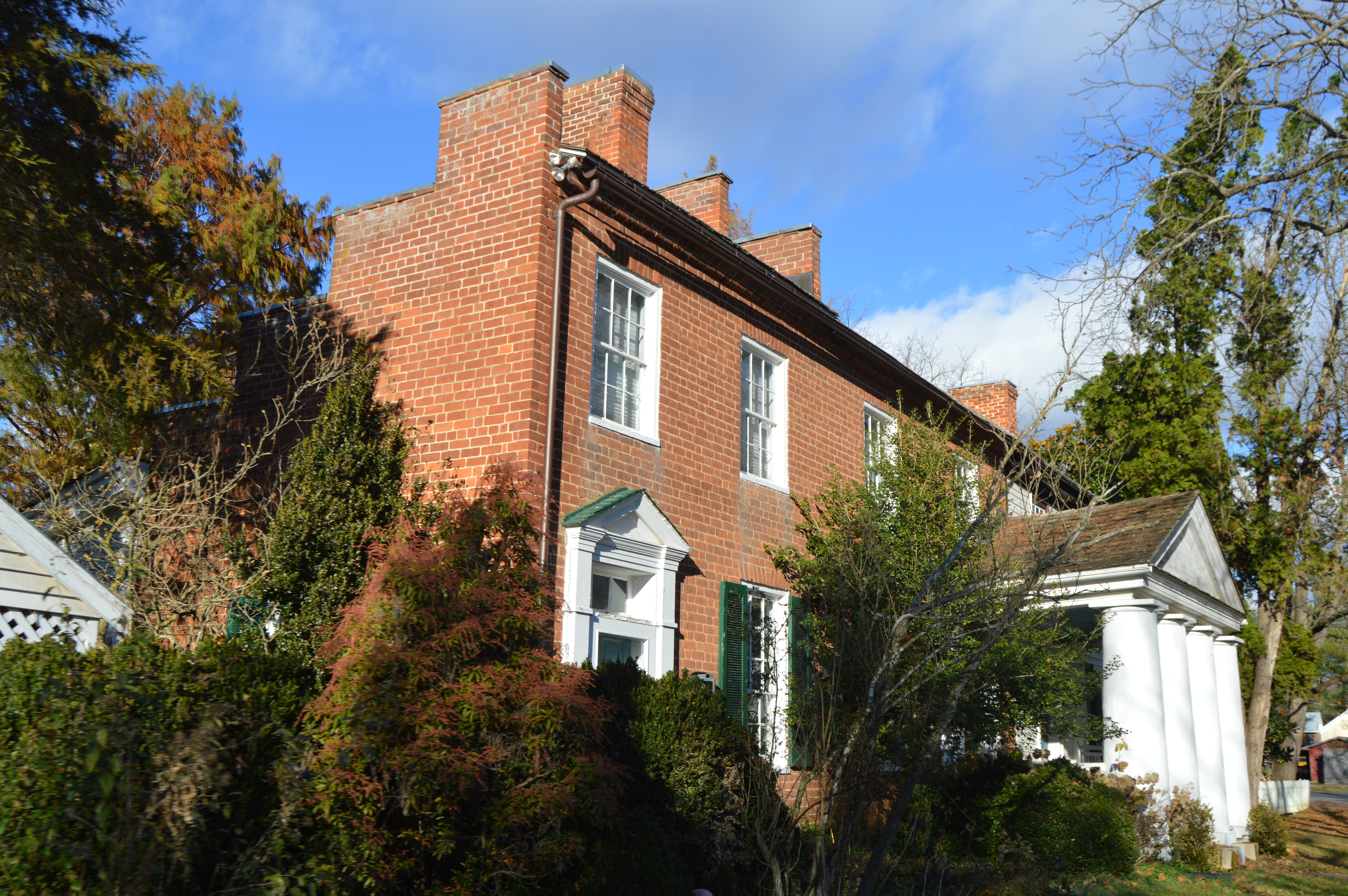
- House on Water Street, west of the Methodist church

- Location within Virginia Location within the United States
- Location: VA 605 and VA 865, Port Republic, Virginia
- Coordinates: 38°17′39″N 78°48′56″W
- Area: 73 acres (30 ha)
- Built: 1775
- Architectural style: Late Victorian, Eclectic
- NRHP reference No.: 80004224
- VLR No.: 082-0123

Significant dates
- Added to NRHP: September 8, 1980
- Designated VLR: July 18, 1978

Port Republic Historic District is a national historic district located at Port Republic, Rockingham County, Virginia. The district encompasses 45 contributing buildings and 62 contributing sites in the village of Port Republic. The district includes a number of archaeological sites that represent a wide diversity in type from residential to institutional, commercial, and industrial sites. They date to the village's years as a river port and industrial complex in the 18th and 19th centuries. Most of the buildings remaining now postdate the town's river port days, but many of these are late 19th-or early 20th-century replacements for buildings destroyed in the disastrous floods of the 1870s and 1880s. The village was at the center of the Battle of Port Republic which took place in June 1862.

It was listed on the National Register of Historic Places in 1978.
