= Long Meadow (Winchester, Virginia) =

Historic house in Virginia, United States

- U.S. National Register of Historic Places
- Virginia Landmarks Register
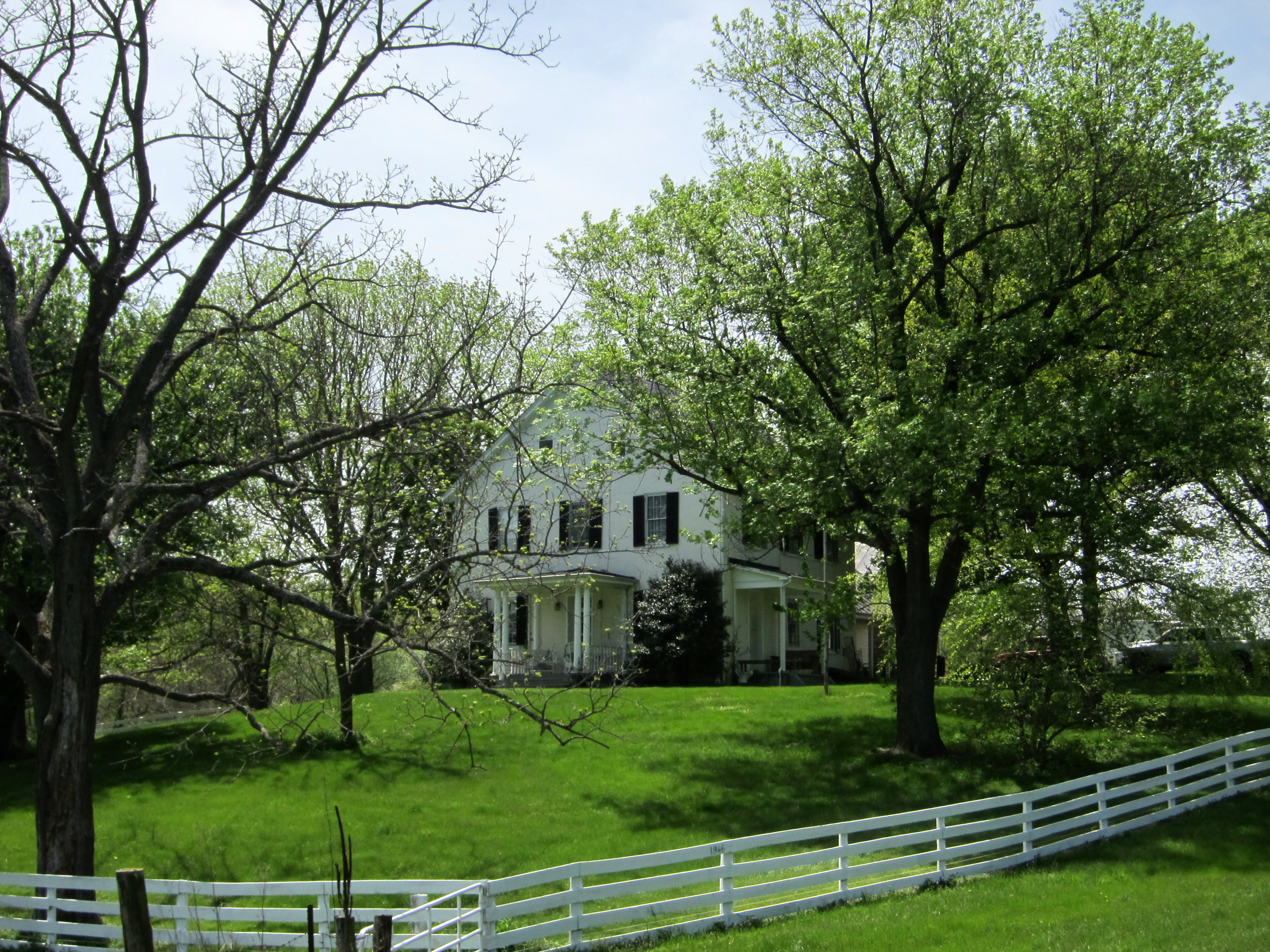

- Location within Virginia Location within the United States
- Location: 1946 Jones Rd., near Winchester, Virginia
- Coordinates: 39°9′10″N 78°13′37″W
- Area: 37 acres (15 ha)
- Built: 1755
- Architectural style: Federal, Greek Revival
- NRHP reference No.: 05000769
- VLR No.: 034-0031

Significant dates
- Added to NRHP: July 27, 2005
- Designated VLR: June 1, 2005

Long Meadow, also known as Long Meadows Farm, is a historic home located near Winchester, in Frederick County, Virginia. The earliest section was built about 1755, and is the 1 1/2-story limestone portion. A 1 1/2-story detached log unit was built shortly after, and connected to the original section by a covered breezeway. In 1827, a large two-story, stuccoed stone wing in a transitional Federal / Greek Revival style was built directly adjacent to log section. The house was restored in 1919, after a fire in the 1827 section in 1916. Also on the property are a contributing stone-lined ice house, an early frame smokehouse, and the ruins of a 1 1/2-story log cabin.

It was listed on the National Register of Historic Places in 2005.
