= Massanetta Springs Historic District =

Historic district in Virginia, United States

- U.S. National Register of Historic Places
- U.S. Historic district
- Virginia Landmarks Register
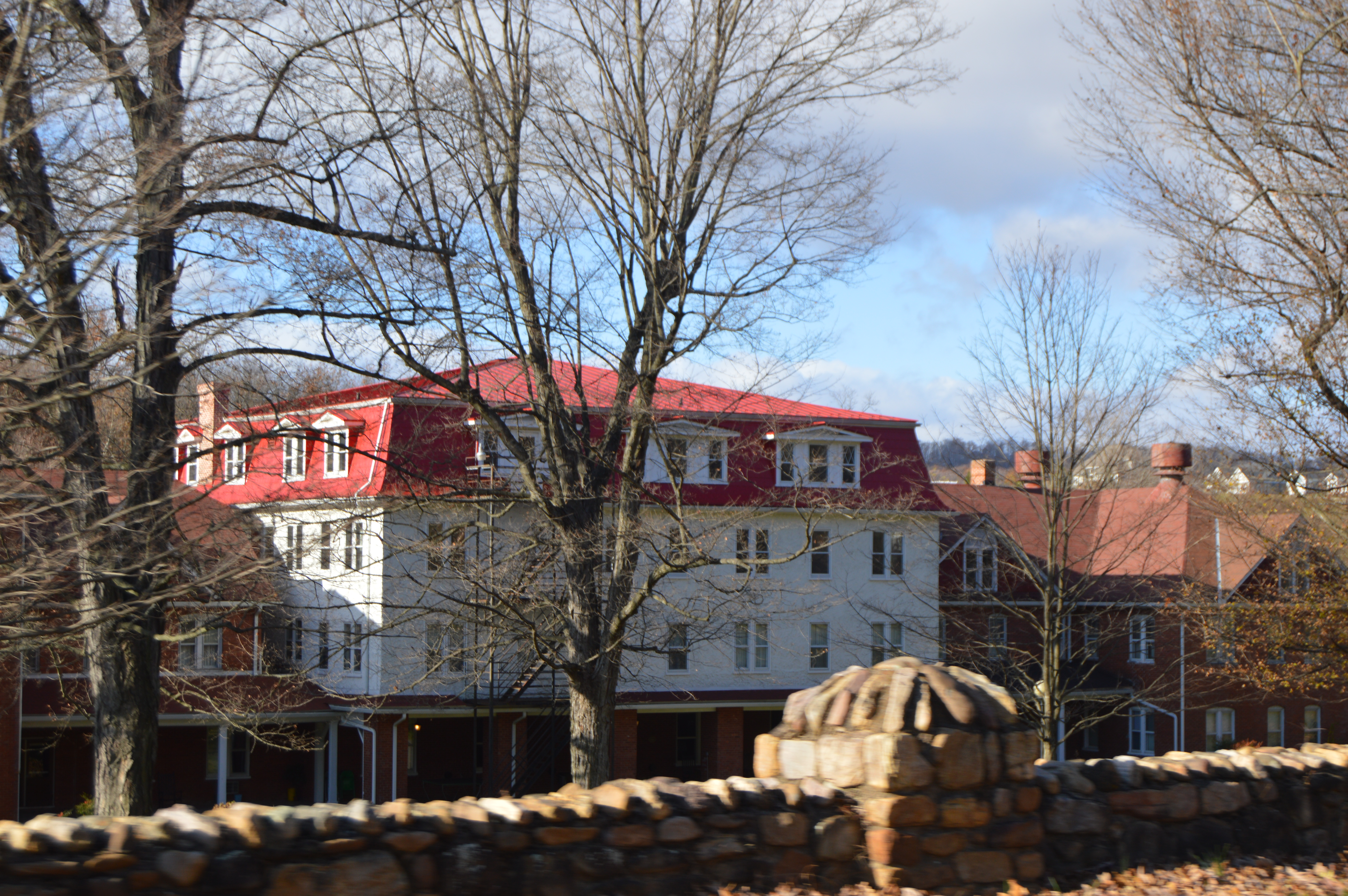
- Front of the hotel

- Location within Virginia Location within the United States
- Location: 712 Massanetta Springs Rd., Harrisonburg, Virginia
- Coordinates: 38°24′3″N 78°50′10″W
- Area: 70 acres (28 ha)
- Built: 1816
- Built by: Fred K. Betts (camp); Heatwole & Hedrick (lodge & church); Sam Shrum (hotel addition)
- Architect: W. Glen Wallace (camp); Joseph Nielsen (hotel addition)
- Lot planner: Charles F. Gillette
- Architectural style: Second Empire, Queen Anne
- NRHP reference No.: 05000477
- VLR No.: 082-0509

Significant dates
- Added to NRHP: May 26, 2005
- Designated VLR: March 16, 2005

The Massanetta Springs Historic District is a retreat in Rockingham County, Virginia, administered by the Presbyterian Synod of the Mid-Atlantic, and chiefly associated with the Massanetta Springs Summer Bible Conference Encampment. The district includes the Hotel (1910), Hudson Auditorium (1922) and Camp Massanetta (1955–56). A Methodist camp existed at the site, originally known as Taylor's Springs, from 1816.

== History ==
The first settler in the area was James Taylor, who built a house there after 1730. About 1816 Jonathan and William Taylor leased the site to the Rockingham Circuit of the Methodist Episcopal Church for use as a camp meeting ground. The annual meetings were extremely popular, and the springs were reported as having healing properties. The springs came under the ownership of Evan Henton in the late 1840s, who operated a modest spa at the site. A partnership established in the 1870s attempted to rename the property the "Ague and Healing Springs", and Dr. Burke Chrisman built a house there in 1885 and a hotel that may have survived until 1994. By 1893 the area was becoming known as Massanetta Springs, a portmanteau of the common local place name Massanutten and Chrisman's wife's name, Henrietta. Chrisman marketed water from the springs, artificially carbonated and sold nationwide as "Massanetta Spring Water" and "Massanetta Water". After the death of Dr. Chrisman in 1909, the property was sold to banker James Robert Lupton of Harrisonburg, Virginia. Lupton began to build a brick hotel at the springs. In 1912 he sold the property to the Massanetta Springs Company, but took back ownership in 1919. The same year Lupton and his wife sold the resort to Hampden-Sydney College in return for a lifetime annuity of $2,400.

Hampden-Sydney College apparently planned to use the property as a Presbyterian boarding school, and retained the New York architectural firm of Visscher & Burley to draft a master plan. By 1920 the academy was losing appeal, and in 1923 the college transferred ownership to the synod. The synod operated the resort as a religious retreat once more and built a tabernacle, the open-air Hudson Auditorium. Conferences and attendance at Massanetta was ecumenical, with Methodist, Baptist, Brethren and Lutheran groups organizing conferences. In the 1930s, the idea of using the property for a school briefly resurfaced, but was abandoned. In 1931, the Massanetta Music School held festivals for church choirs, running through 1939.

From 1925, a series of cottages was built near "The Grove," eventually comprising 41 privately owned cottages. These cottages are outside the historic district. In 1947, the Richardson Building, an army surplus structure, was built to provide additional guest accommodation; it was modernized and given a second floor in 1962, giving it the appearance of a motel, and resulting in its exclusion form the historic district.

In the mid-1950s, Camp Massanetta was established on a ridge to the west of the main development. Minnesota architect W. Glen Wallace designed a campground with sixteen cabins, lodges, dining hall, bathhouses, infirmary, director's cabin, and a swimming pool, all completed in 1956. Tent campsites were developed in the surrounding woods. In 2001, the New Lodge was built.

== Description ==
The most significant building in the district is the hotel. The brick and frame hotel is four stories with a mansard roof in a version of the Second Empire style. The ground floor is of brick, with stuccoed second and third floors, and a pressed -metal treatment on the attic or fourth floor. A porch extends across the front and rear. The interior was partly renovated in the 1950s with plywood and glass. The principal interior historic element is the grand staircase.

The Hudson Memorial Auditorium is a roofed structure open to the weather on the sides. The original section was built in 1922, with a classroom addition in 1925. More classrooms were added in 1930, 1939 and circa 1950. The roof trusses are exposed. Seats are bolted to the sloping floor, which falls to the stage at the west end. Benches are arranged on the sides, with bleachers at the east end. Classrooms are underneath the auditorium, with toilets in a basement.

Other buildings include the rustic Fannie Lupton Building, which provides meeting space, and the Lucy Steele Memorial Prayer Room, a plain concrete block chapel. The reinforced concrete Nook (1957–58) is a book store and cafe. The Springhouse houses faucets and the spring itself.

Camp Massanetta is arranged in four "villages" labeled A, B, C and D. Buildings are of frame construction on concrete slabs with rough siding. Deep overhanging eaves are supported by diagonal braces with a modern look. Interiors are austere with open trusses and minimal finishes. The Bell Auditorium is the chief building in the camps, which continues the theme of deep overhangs supported by diagonals. It is now used as a dining facility.

Massanetta Springs was placed on the National Register of Historic Places on May 26, 2005.
