= Harnsberger Farm =

Historic house in Virginia, United States

- U.S. National Register of Historic Places
- Virginia Landmarks Register
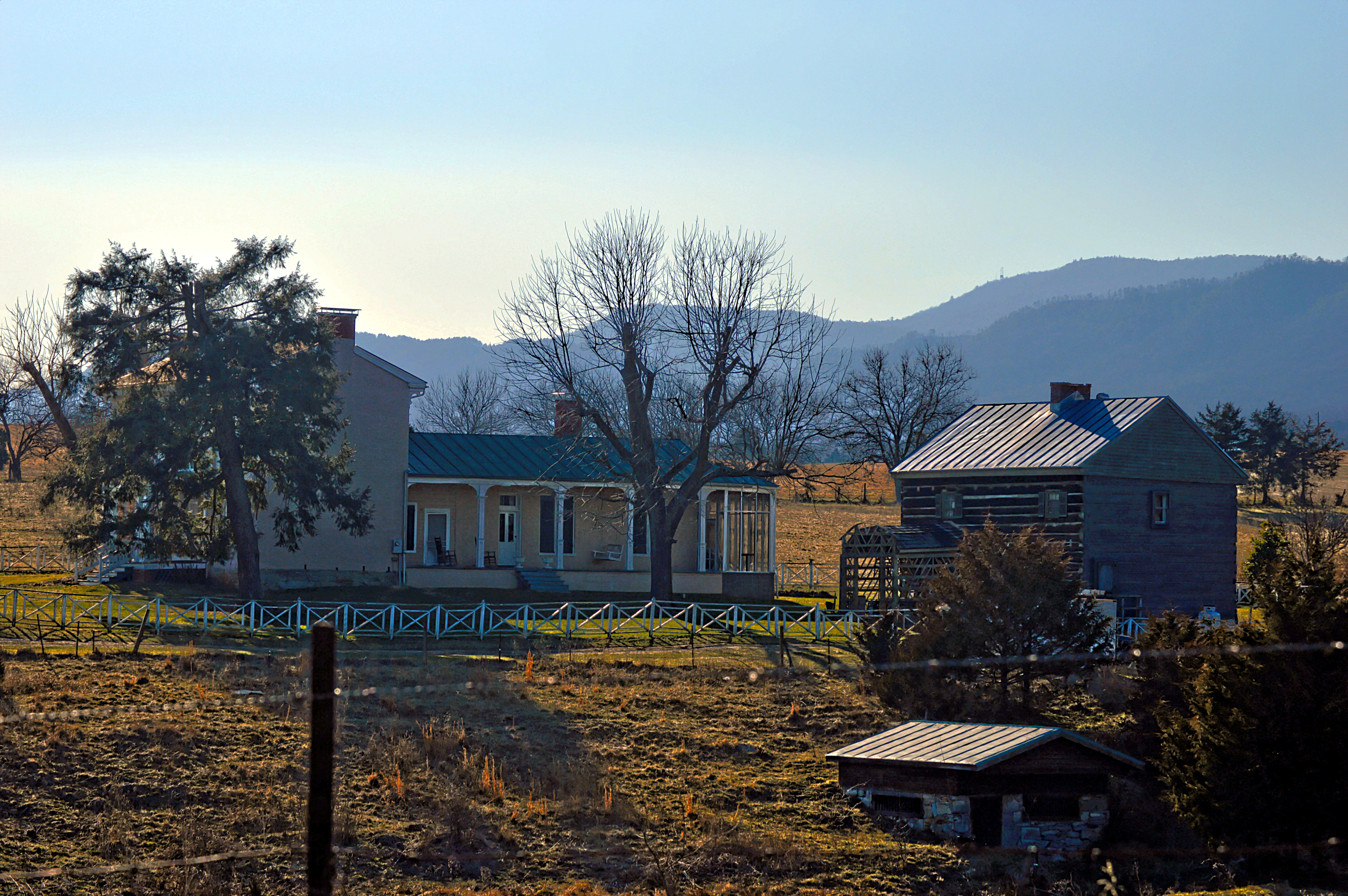
- Roadside view from the east

- Location within Virginia Location within the United States
- Location: Junction of VA 601 and VA 602, near Shenandoah, Virginia
- Coordinates: 38°28′41″N 78°38′22″W
- Area: 42 acres (17 ha)
- Built: 1859-1861
- Architectural style: Italianate, log house
- NRHP reference No.: 91001974
- VLR No.: 082-0132

Significant dates
- Added to NRHP: January 22, 1992
- Designated VLR: October 19, 1991

Harnsberger Farm, also known as Golden Creek Farm, has two historic homes and farm located near Shenandoah, Rockingham County, Virginia. The main house was built between 1859 and 1861, and is a two-story, three-bay, brick Italianate style I-house. A library and bathroom were added in the early-20th century. The house features decorative interior painting, which probably dates from the 1890s. The second house is a rectangular, two-story, two-bay, log house dating to the second quarter of the 19th century.

It was listed on the National Register of Historic Places in 1992.
