= McGaheysville, Virginia =

McGaheysville
- Census-designated place
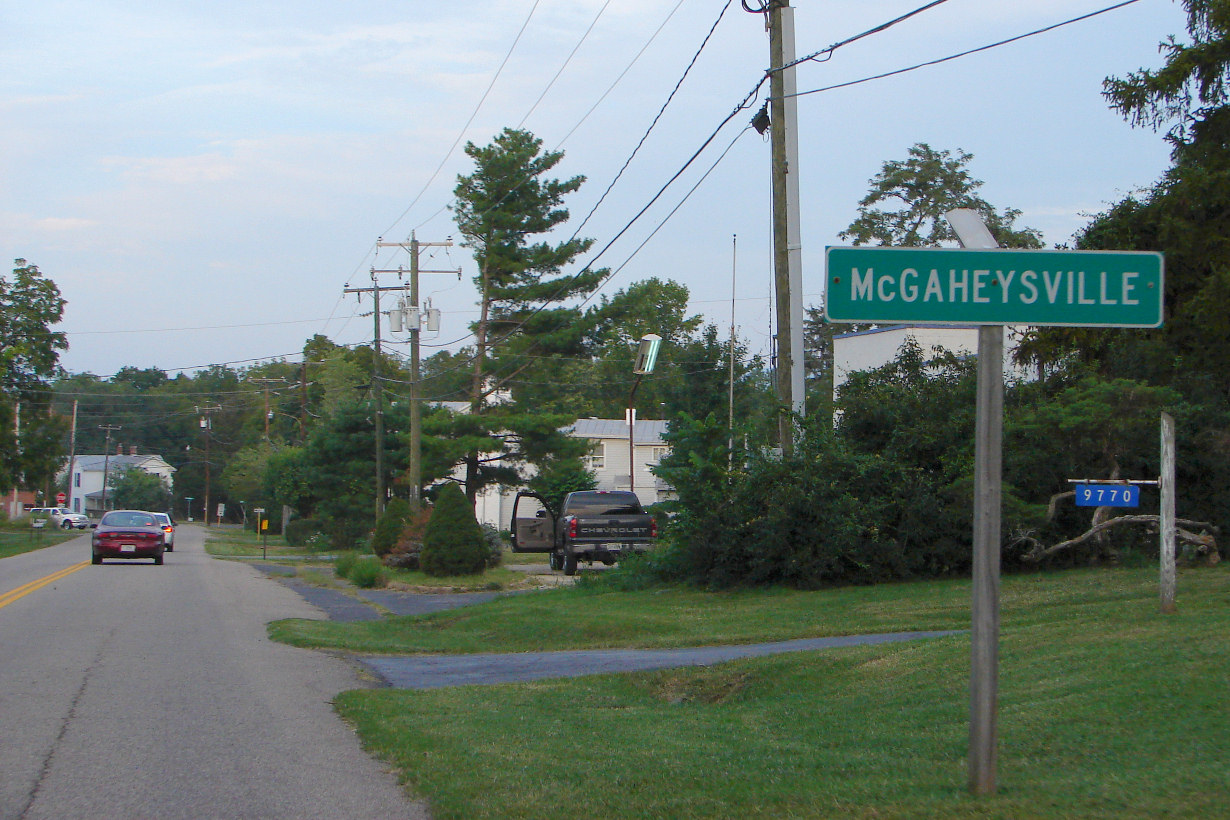

- Location of the McGaheysville CDP within the Rockingham County

- Location in Virginia McGaheysville (the United States)
- Coordinates: 38°22′31″N 78°43′43″W
- Country: United States
- State: Virginia
- County: Rockingham County

Area
  - Total: 0.85 sq mi (2.21 km^{2})

Population (2020)
  - Total: 978
- FIPS code: 51-48232
- GNIS feature ID: 2807440

McGaheysville ( /məˈɡækizvɪl/ mə-GAK-eez-vil) is a Census-designated place located in Rockingham County, in the U.S. state of Virginia. It is located along U.S. Route 33 between Penn Laird and Elkton, and sits at the base of the Massanutten.

As of the 2020 census, McGaheysville had a population of 978.

== History ==
The earliest records mentioning a settlement in the area date to 1716, when Governor Alexander Spotswood ventured west of the Blue Ridge Mountains on the Knights of the Golden Horseshoe Expedition. The first European-American to settle permanently in the area was Adam Miller (Mueller) (1703–1783), a native of Germany who arrived in 1726 and made his homestead near present-day Elkton. Later, several German and Dutch immigrants moved into the area. and a village began to grow up around the Upper Peaked Mountain Church, which had been established in the vicinity. Records from 1758 reveal that a Lutheran preacher, Reverend Lawrence Wartman, originally from Lancaster County, Pennsylvania was preaching in the McGaheysville area who had likely arrived the year before in 1757. He is widely believed to have been the first Lutheran preacher who settled in Rockingham County. In 1758 he was involved in a court case in Augusta County court to naturalize one of his congregation from the Upper Peaked Mountain Church he was stationed at in the McGaheysville vicinity. In 1762, Jacob Herman ceded land to both the Lutherans and the Reformed Church to build the Union Church in the area in conjunction, built in a part called "Stony Run".

Reverend Philip Charles Van Gemunden, a German Reformed preacher, arrived in the county in 1762 and preached at the Upper Peaked Mountain church which had been established in the area which is now McGaheysville. After his death in 1764, he was succeeded by Charles Lang from Frederick, Maryland who bought a farm in Timberville and in the McGaheysville area. However he was a controversial figure who in 1771 was ordered to leave Virginia, leaving his more respectable wife behind. The village community that was beginning to grow around the church was originally named Ursulaburg after her.

McGaheysville was named for surveyor Tobias Randolph McGahey, who came to the area as part of a Scotch-Irish colonization effort in 1801. Shortly thereafter he married innkeeper Eva Conrad, at whose tavern he had previously spent the night. In 1802 he established a post office using the name "McGaheysville" and gave the town its name. McGaheysville has been declared the "most difficult to pronounce" place name in the state of Virginia by Reader's Digest.

McGaheysville saw almost no action in the American Civil War, save for a skirmish during the Shenandoah Valley Campaign, on April 27, 1862, involving one section of an artillery battery of New York Militia; it is, however, located near to the site of the Battle of Cross Keys, and consequently soldiers from both the Union Army and the Confederate Army passed through during the campaign.

March 6, 1878, the lynching of Charlotte Harris by a mob of white men occurred just outside of McGaheysville. The murder of Harris is the only documented instance of a Black woman being lynched in Virginia's history.

== Geography ==
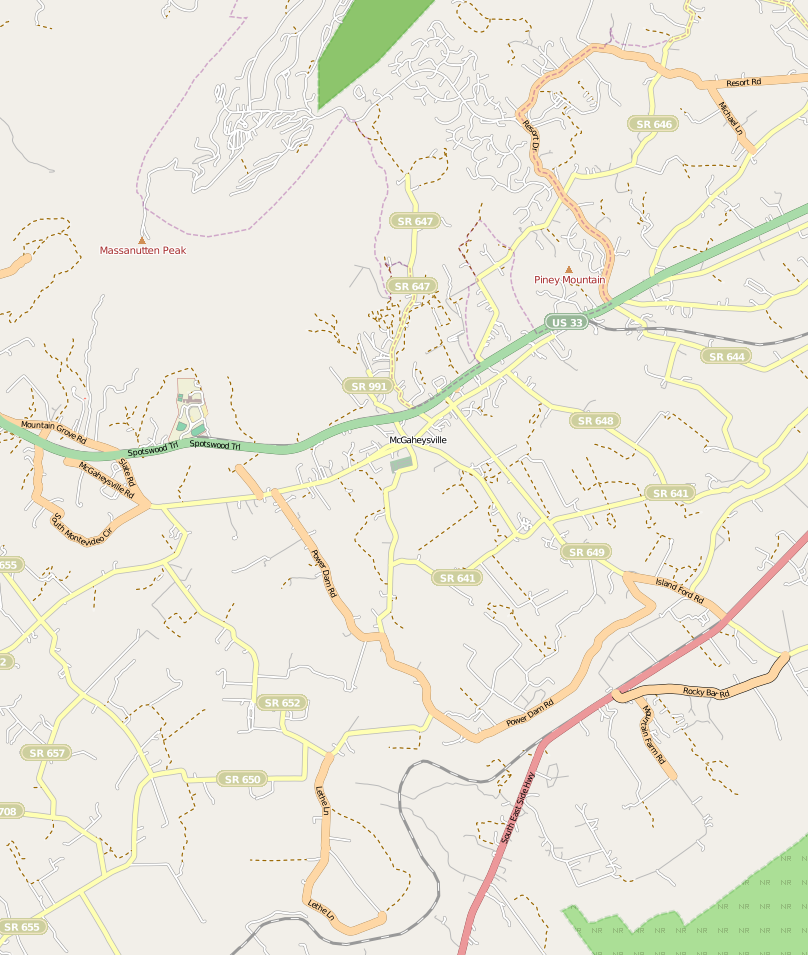
Map of McGaheysville (click three times to view clearly)

McGaheysville lies in northern central Virginia in the northeastern United States. It lies along the U.S. Route 33, between Penn Laird to the west and Elkton to the east. This road is part of the Spotswood Trail which leads from Harrisonburg located several kilometres beyond Penn Laird to the west. McGaheysville is located near the south fork of Shenandoah River in the heart of the Shenandoah Valley. The land to the immediate south of the village consists primarily of farmland but beyond that is the mountainous Shenandoah National Park. The area immediately north of the village is mountainous with the peak of Massanutten, located just to the northeast. Piney Mountain, even nearer to the village than Massanutten, is located in the northeastern part of McGaheysville.

== Demographics ==
McGaheysville first appeared as a census designated place in the 2020 U.S. census.

== Facilities ==
Several buildings in McGaheysville date to 1840. The town is currently home to an elementary school, completed in 1969 and built on the site of the former high school, which had been destroyed by fire in 1968. McGaheysville has a volunteer fire department, which hosts a weekly bingo and an annual three-day lawn party in the summer when families turn up to enjoy live music, rides and games and eat. The adjacent resort of Massanutten, which began operations in 1971, plays an important role in the local economy, fuelled by tourism all year round with its 14 ski trails, 36 holes of golf, a water park which opened in October 2005 and other facilities. The resort has its origins in the late 1960s when John L. Hopkins II, a wealthy local landowner from McGaheysville, realized the economic potential of Massanutten Peak one day after viewing it through the farmhouse kitchen window and attracted investors to build a resort of 5,200 acres.

Cave Hill Farm, listed on the National Register of Historic Places, is located in the vicinity of McGaheysville.

== Notable person ==
- Thomas G. Mauzy (1843-1912)
