= Kyle's Mill House =

Historic house in Virginia, United States

- U.S. National Register of Historic Places
- Virginia Landmarks Register
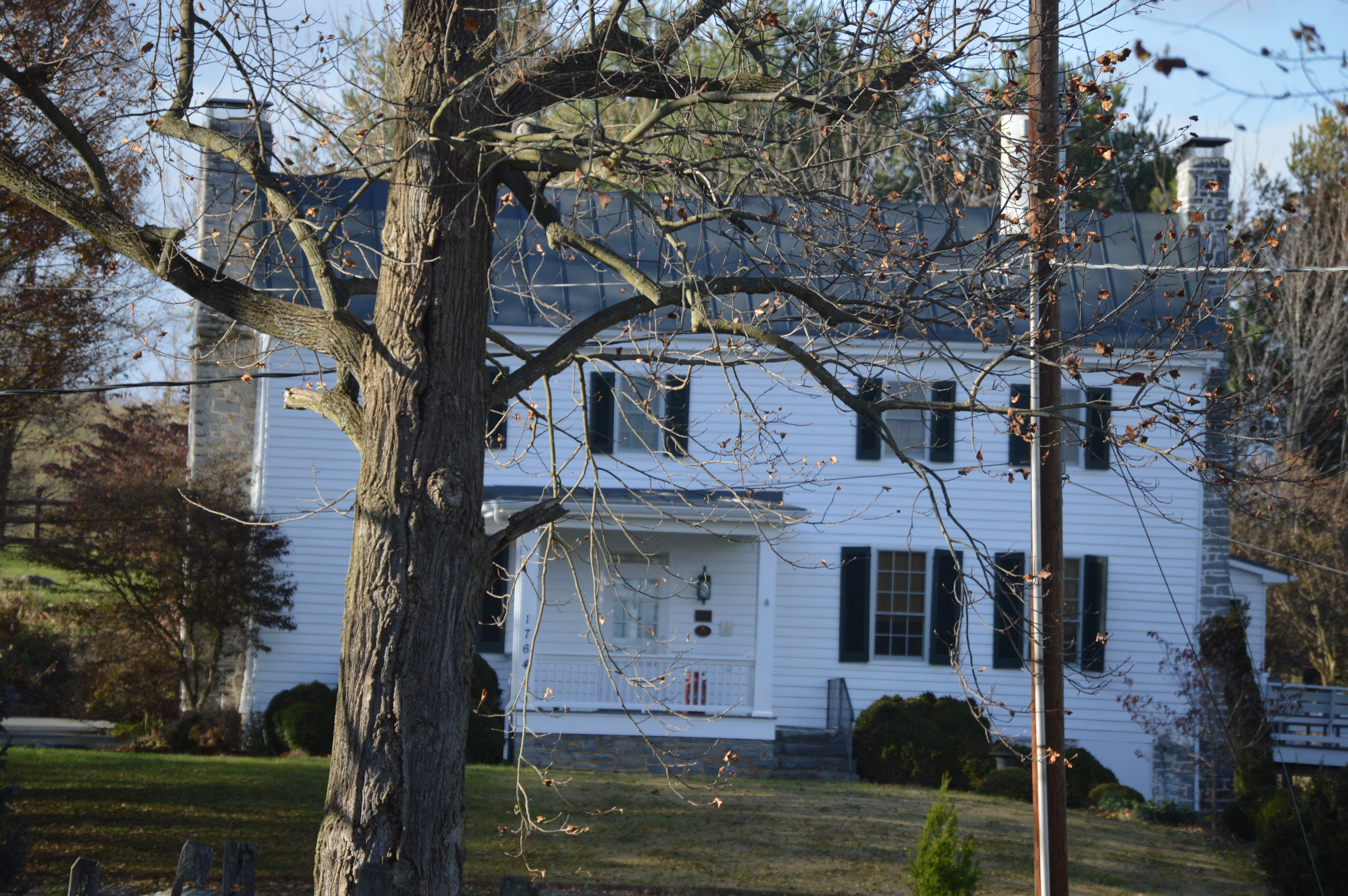
- Roadside view of the house

- Location within Virginia Location within the United States
- Location: 1764 Cross Keys Road, near Harrisonburg, Virginia
- Coordinates: 38°22′29″N 78°49′37″W
- Area: 277 acres (112 ha)
- Built: c. 1750
- NRHP reference No.: 01000142
- VLR No.: 082-5075

Significant dates
- Added to NRHP: March 6, 2001
- Designated VLR: September 13, 2000

Kyle's Mill House is a historic home located near Harrisonburg, Rockingham County, Virginia. It was built about 1750, and was built as a two-story, hall-parlor plan log dwelling with a side gable roof. It was expanded about 1826 to a central-hall plan, a rear ell was added in 1903, and the house was renovated in 1986. The house is clad in weatherboard and has exterior end chimneys.

It was listed on the National Register of Historic Places in 2001.
