= Bogota (Port Republic, Virginia) =

Historic house in Virginia, United States

- U.S. National Register of Historic Places
- U.S. Historic district
- Virginia Landmarks Register
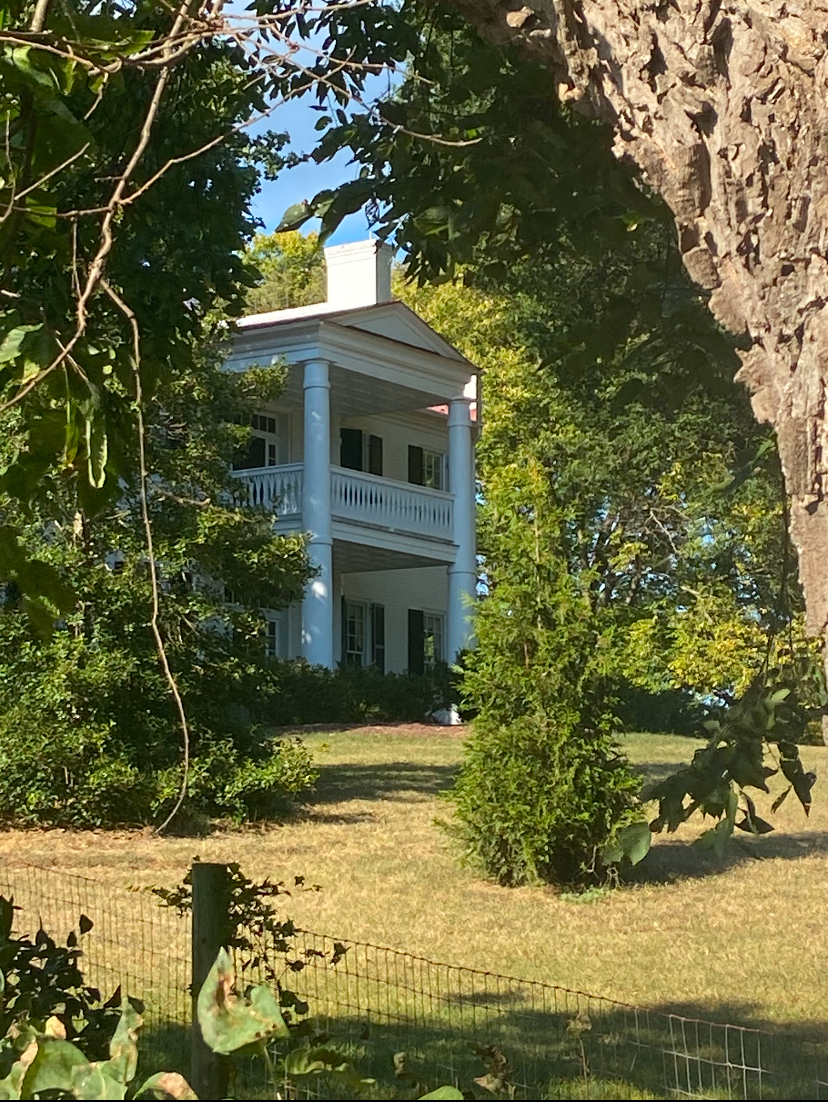
- Roadside view of the main house

- Location within Virginia Location within the United States
- Location: 5375 Lynnwood Road, near Port Republic, Virginia
- Coordinates: 38°19′3″N 78°46′27″W
- Area: 165.5 acres (67.0 ha)
- Built: 1845-1847
- Architectural style: Greek Revival
- NRHP reference No.: 09000162
- VLR No.: 082-0029

Significant dates
- Added to NRHP: March 24, 2009
- Designated VLR: December 8, 2008

Bogota, also known as Bogota Farm, is a historic home and farm and national historic district located near Port Republic, Rockingham County, Virginia. An extremely well-preserved antebellum mansion, Bogota was built in 1847 on the site of a 1756 home constructed by attorney and politician Gabriel Jones. It was the scene of military action during the Battle of Port Republic on June 9, 1862.

== History ==
The property was 244 acres purchased from Christopher Francisco (or Franciscus) by Gabriel Jones in August, 1751. (Note: At least one source claims that the land was deeded to Jones by King George III.) Thomas Lewis, Jones' brother-in-law and son of John Lewis, purchased 530 acres from Francisco across the river. The Lewis property, initially known as Lewiston, was later renamed Lynnwood. Jones built the first Bogota mansion in 1756, naming it after the Colombian city Bogotá. Because Jones was a prominent attorney, the road on which he lived was known as "Lawyer's Road," now Lawyer Road. The first Bogota house was a wooden, one-and-a-half story structure with dormer windows.

Jones is known to have entertained George Washington, together with Thomas Lewis and Jones' son-in-law John Harvie, at Bogota on October 1, 1784.

Jones lived at Bogota until his death in 1806, after which his widow, Margaret Morton Jones, continued to live there until her death in 1822. An appraisal of the property in 1823 noted the presence of "upwards of forty very likely Negroes" as agricultural laborers. Jones's grandson Jaquelin Harvie sold Bogota in 1830 to Jacob Strayer, who lived in the Jones dwelling until he began building the present house around 1845. The current building was completed in 1847, but it is not known when the original home was demolished. Wainscoting from the Jones house was used in what is now the sitting room near the front entrance, and some of the woodwork in the undercroft at Grace Memorial Episcopal Church in Port Republic is thought to be from Bogota. Jacob Strayer died in 1863, leaving the property to his daughter Eliza. An 1865 map of the estate shows twenty-one outbuildings as well as a mill. In 1908, Bogota passed to Strayer's daughter, Margaret Catherine Strayer Kemper. Her son, Dr. Albert Strayer Kemper, inherited Bogota in 1909 and practiced medicine there until his death in 1941. The current owner, Graham Clayton Lilly, is a great-great-grandson of Jacob Strayer.

It was listed on the National Register of Historic Places in 2009.

== Description ==
The main house was built between 1845 and 1847, and is a two-story, five-bay, brick Greek Revival style dwelling. It features a brick cornice, stepped-parapet gable end walls, and a low-pitched gable roof. The front facade has a two-story pedimented portico sheltering the center bay. The first-floor rooms have 10-foot high ceilings. The front door opens into a central stair hall, with a stairway featuring a cylindrical handrail terminating in a spherical knob. The stair leads to a landing and then breaks into two sections, leading to the front and rear second-floor bedrooms. The dining room originally included an enclosed stairway leading up to a schoolroom. Three of the bedrooms have original built-in clothes presses next to the chimneys. Most of the interior doors retain their original English-made Carpenter patent locks, each mounted with an iron box with brass fittings.

Also on the property are the contributing 1845 smokehouse, a garden area, a bank barn built in 1900, an 18th-century log house (formerly a tenant house, now used as an office), and four archaeological sites, one of which may be the site of the 1756 home. Two white-painted, well-preserved 1845 buildings, one a small brick building, the other a wood-frame building with two front doors, that were slaves' and later servants' quarters, are located behind the main house. A cemetery with unmarked graves, located to the southeast of the house, is thought to be a slave burial ground. The Strayer family cemetery is located just across Lynnwood Road.

== US Civil War ==
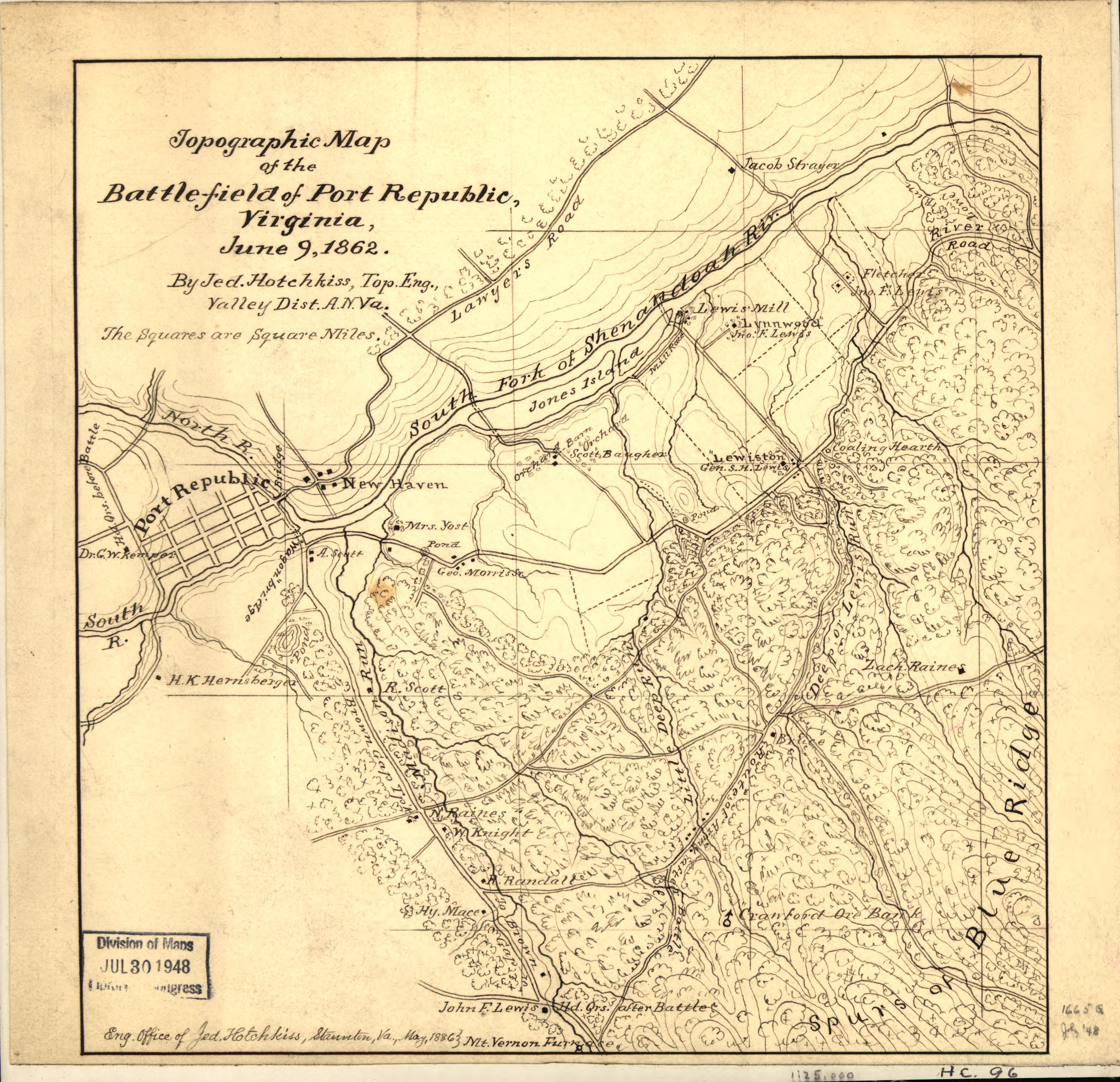
Map of the Battle of Port Republic. Bogota ("Jacob Strayer") can be seen at the top of the map, to the right.

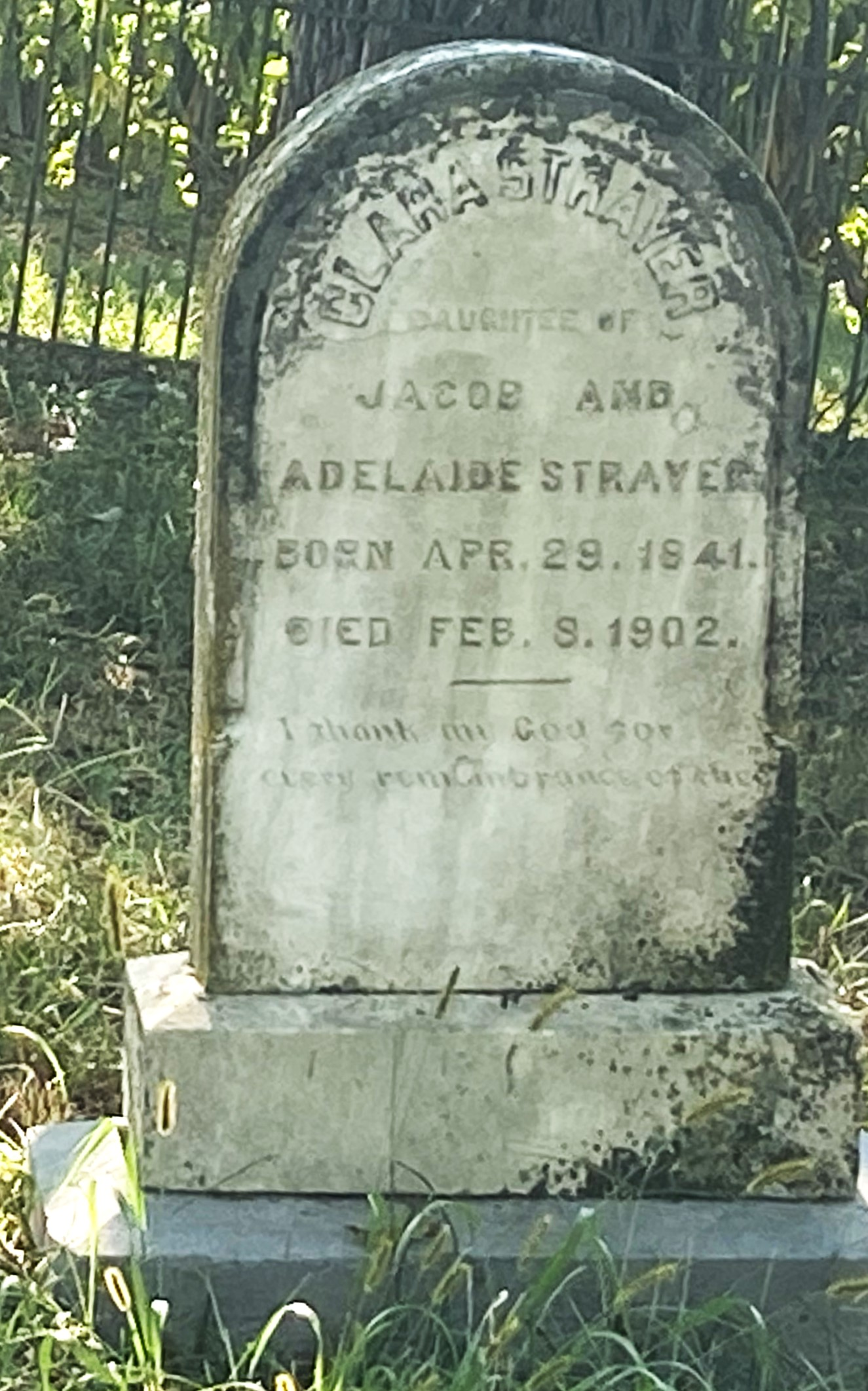
Grave of Clara Strayer in the Strayer family cemetery, located near Bogota.

On June 9, 1862, Bogota was the scene of action during the Battle of Port Republic, in which Confederate Major General Thomas J. "Stonewall" Jackson's forces confronted Union troops under Brigadier General Erastus B. Tyler. This was the final battle of Stonewall Jackson's Valley Campaign. The Strayer family and their neighbors were able to view the early part of the battle until gunsmoke obscured the field. During the battle, shells struck one of the outbuildings near the orchard, but no one was injured. Soon afterwards, Union troops under the command of Major General John C. Frémont burst into the house, searching for Confederate soldiers. Clara Strayer, the owner's 21-year-old daughter, wrote that

"They next came to the house in search of Rebels and...poured in every door, and such a clanking of sabers; ransacking of presses; trying to break open doors, I never saw. They came into our chamber when I remarked, 'this is a ladies' chamber and as such will be respected by gentlemen!' The leader, a big, huffy Dutchman, replied 'Yah! Yah! If dere be any Dutch gentlemen! Come on, boys, let's go to town!'"

Strayer mentions that when the soldiers attempted to steal honey from a bee hive behind the house, a cloud of angry bees forced them to flee. The soldiers took with them all the food they found in the house and several horses.

== Archaeological sites ==
Four archaeological sites have been identified near Bogota, in a 1976 survey conducted by Bill Oliver and James Wood of James Madison University. North of the main house is a site consisting of fragments of pottery, stoneware, glass, and china of historic European origin, which may be the site of Gabriel Jones' 1756 home. This lies on top of a prehistoric site possibly representing a Native American community. Southeast of the main house is a cemetery site with unmarked graves, believed to be a slave cemetery. Just south of Lawyer Road, near its junction with Lynnwood Road, is a site of a prehistoric Native American occupation consisting of the remains of stone tools and debris. About fifty yards to the northwest is another site possibly representing a prehistoric indigenous community.
