= Jonathan Peale House =

Historic house in Virginia, United States

- U.S. National Register of Historic Places
- Virginia Landmarks Register
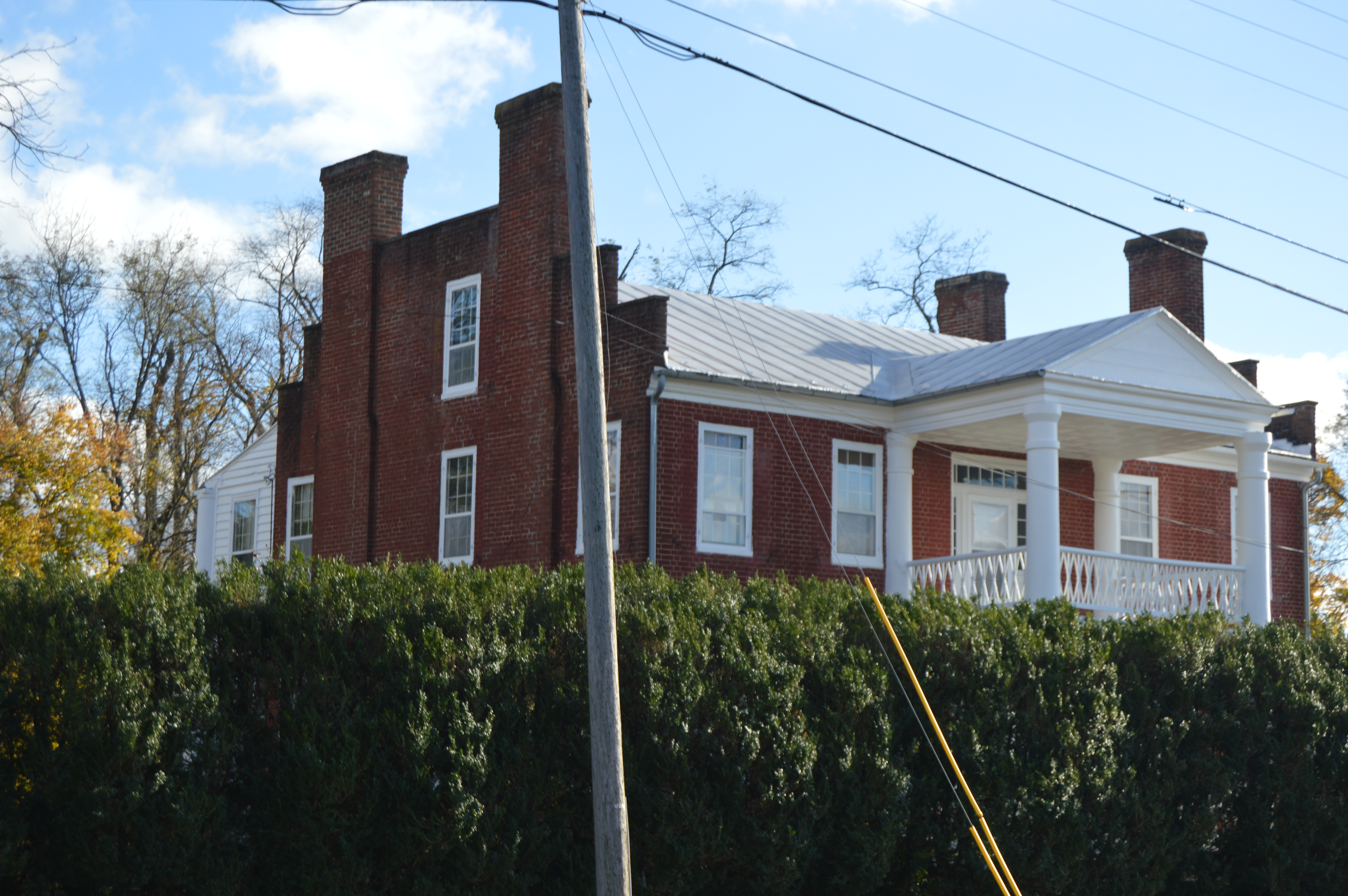
- Front and northeastern side

- Location within Virginia Location within the United States
- Location: 67 Cross Keys Rd., near Harrisonburg, Virginia
- Coordinates: 38°23′31″N 78°48′39″W
- Area: 2.5 acres (1.0 ha)
- Built: c. 1845
- Architectural style: Greek Revival
- NRHP reference No.: 07001144
- VLR No.: 082-0032

Significant dates
- Added to NRHP: November 1, 2007
- Designated VLR: September 5, 2007

Jonathan Peale House is a historic home located near Harrisonburg, Rockingham County, Virginia. It was built about 1845, and is a two-story, five-bay, central-passage plan brick dwelling in the Greek Revival style. The front facade feature a central two-story gabled portico supported by stucco-covered Tuscan order columns. On the rear facade is a two-story, full-width gallery porch supported by stucco-covered masonry columns. Also on the property are the contributing well, slave quarter, and tennis court. The house was used as Confederate General Stonewall Jackson’s headquarters in April 1862.

It was listed on the National Register of Historic Places in 2007.
