= Haugh House =

- U.S. National Register of Historic Places
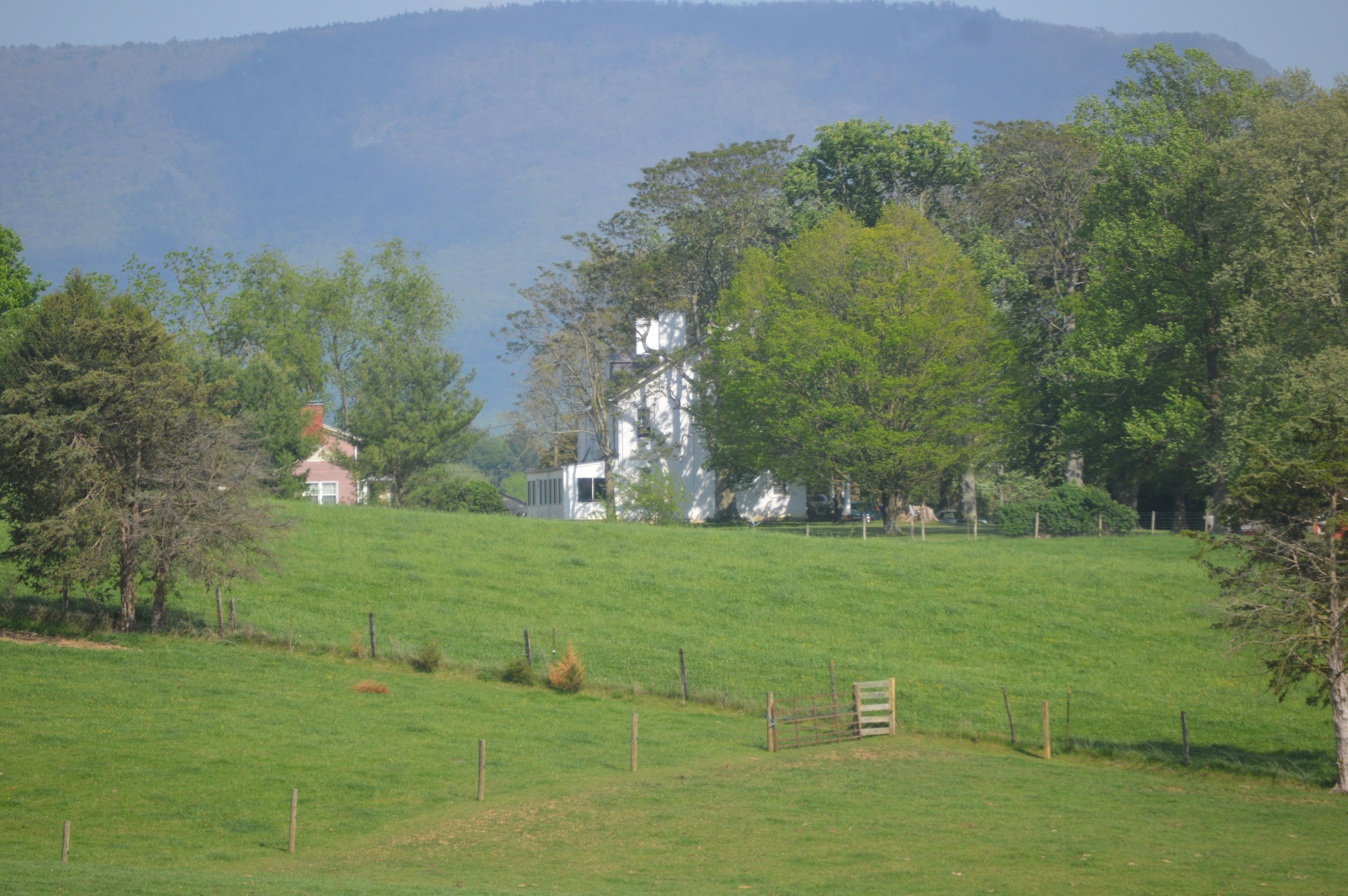
- Distant view from the west

- Location within Virginia Location within the United States
- Location: 6529 Port Republic Rd., Harrisonburg, Virginia
- Coordinates: 38°21′5″N 78°49′27″W
- Area: 1.7 acres (0.69 ha)
- Built: 1855
- Architectural style: Greek Revival
- NRHP reference No.: 11000552
- Added to NRHP: August 18, 2011

The Haugh House is a two-story, Greek-Revival lodge I-house residential building with a standing-seam gabled roof, wrapped in weatherboard, built about 1855. It was added to the National Register of Historic Places on August 18, 2011.

It is in the center of the Cross Keys Battlefield in Rockingham County, Virginia. It has six-over-six windows with double-hung wooden sash, exposed floor and ceiling joists, a large center hall, original, interior chambered moldings and hand-planed partition walls. It originally included two limestone chimneys, but they were damaged during the Battle of Cross Keys, during the American Civil War and subsequently removed.

John Haugh purchased 80 acres of land from his father-in-law in 1844, and began farming it. In about 1855, the house was added. A two-story rear ell was added in about 1915, and several outbuildings were added from the 1920s on.

The front portion of the building is a two-story, single-pile antebellum log I-house built in the vernacular Greek Revival style, and remains largely intact. It is three bays on a continuous cut limestone foundation. It has seven windows with six-over-six, double-hung wooden sashes, the bay has three two-over-two double-hung wooden sashes. This portion of the building suffered significant structural damage from heavy shelling during the Battle of Cross Keys.

The second portion of the house, a two-story, balloon-framed ell was constructed about 1915. Electricity was added in the late 1930s.
