= Long Meadow (Harrisonburg, Virginia) =

Historic house in Virginia, United States

- U.S. National Register of Historic Places
- Virginia Landmarks Register
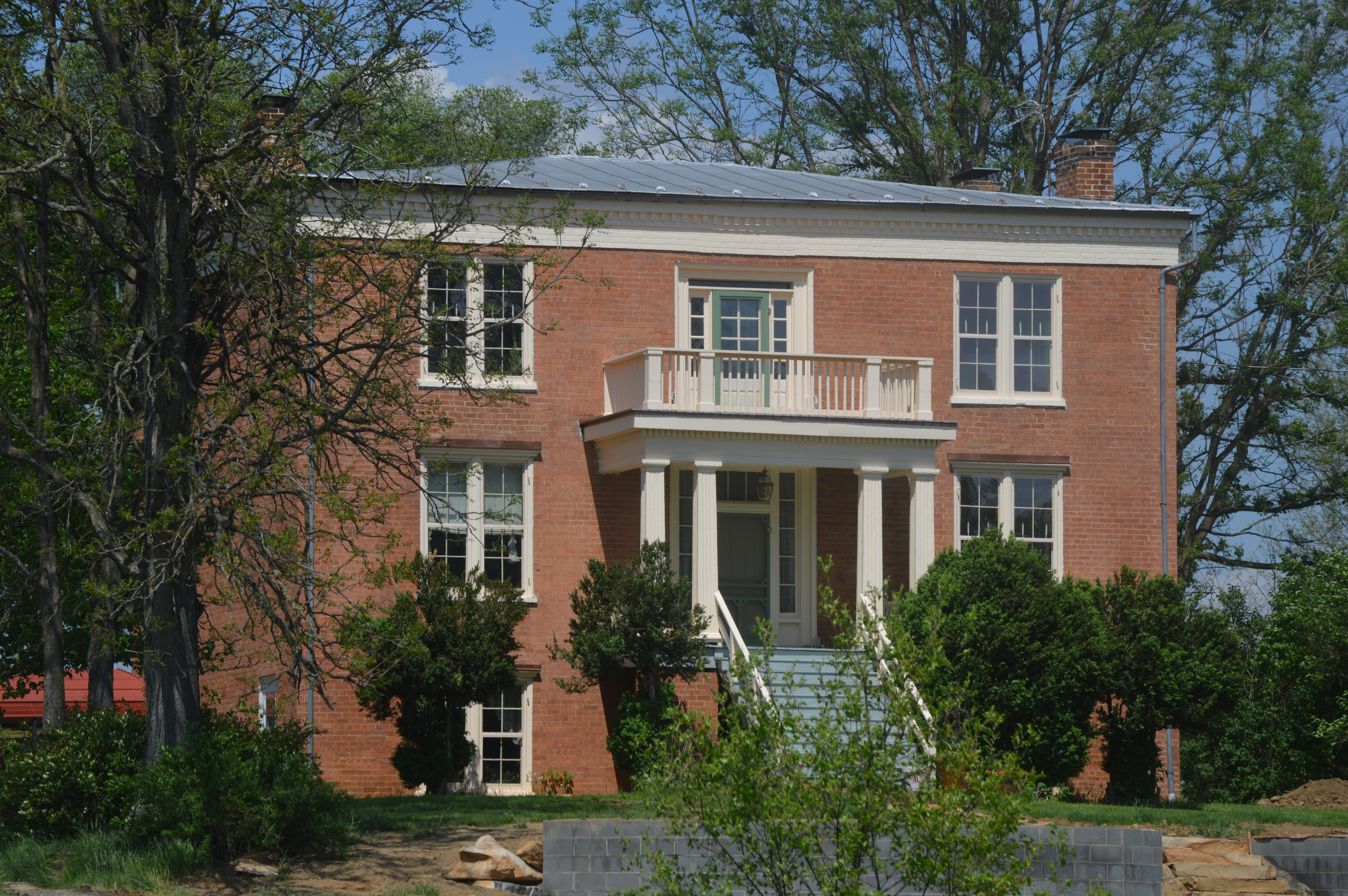
- Front of the house

- Location within Virginia Location within the United States
- Location: 2525 Fridleys Gap Rd., near Harrisonburg, Virginia
- Coordinates: 38°30′53″N 78°44′28″W
- Area: 41.4 acres (16.8 ha)
- Built: c. 1845
- Built by: Cyrus Rhodes
- Architectural style: Greek Revival
- NRHP reference No.: 05000528
- VLR No.: 082-0111

Significant dates
- Added to NRHP: June 1, 2005
- Designated VLR: March 16, 2005

Long Meadow, also known as the Cyrus Rhodes House, is a historic home located near Harrisonburg, Rockingham County, Virginia. It was built about 1845, and is a two-story, three-bay, double-pile brick dwelling in the Greek Revival style. It sits on an English basement, has a low-pitched standing seam metal hipped roof, and central-passage plan. Also on the property are the contributing frame bank barn (c. 1866) and family cemetery.

It was listed on the National Register of Historic Places in 2005.
