= Battle of Port Republic =

1862 battle of the American Civil War

Coordinates: 38.3002°N 78.7933°W

- Part of the American Civil War
Date	June 9, 1862
Location	Rockingham County, Virginia
Result	Confederate victory

Belligerents
United States (Union)	(Confederate States of America) Confederate States (Confederacy)

Commanders and leaders
Erastus B. Tyler	Stonewall Jackson; Stapleton Crutchfield; Thomas T. Munford

Strength
3,500	6,000

Casualties and losses
1,002	816

The Battle of Port Republic was fought on June 9, 1862, in Rockingham County, Virginia, as part of Confederate Army Maj. Gen. Thomas J. "Stonewall" Jackson's campaign through the Shenandoah Valley during the American Civil War. Port Republic was a fierce contest between two equally determined foes and was the most costly battle fought by Jackson's Army of the Valley during its campaign. Together, the battles of Cross Keys (fought the previous day) and Port Republic were the decisive victories in Jackson's Valley Campaign, forcing the Union armies to retreat and leaving Jackson free to reinforce Gen. Robert E. Lee for the Seven Days Battles outside Richmond, Virginia.

== Background ==
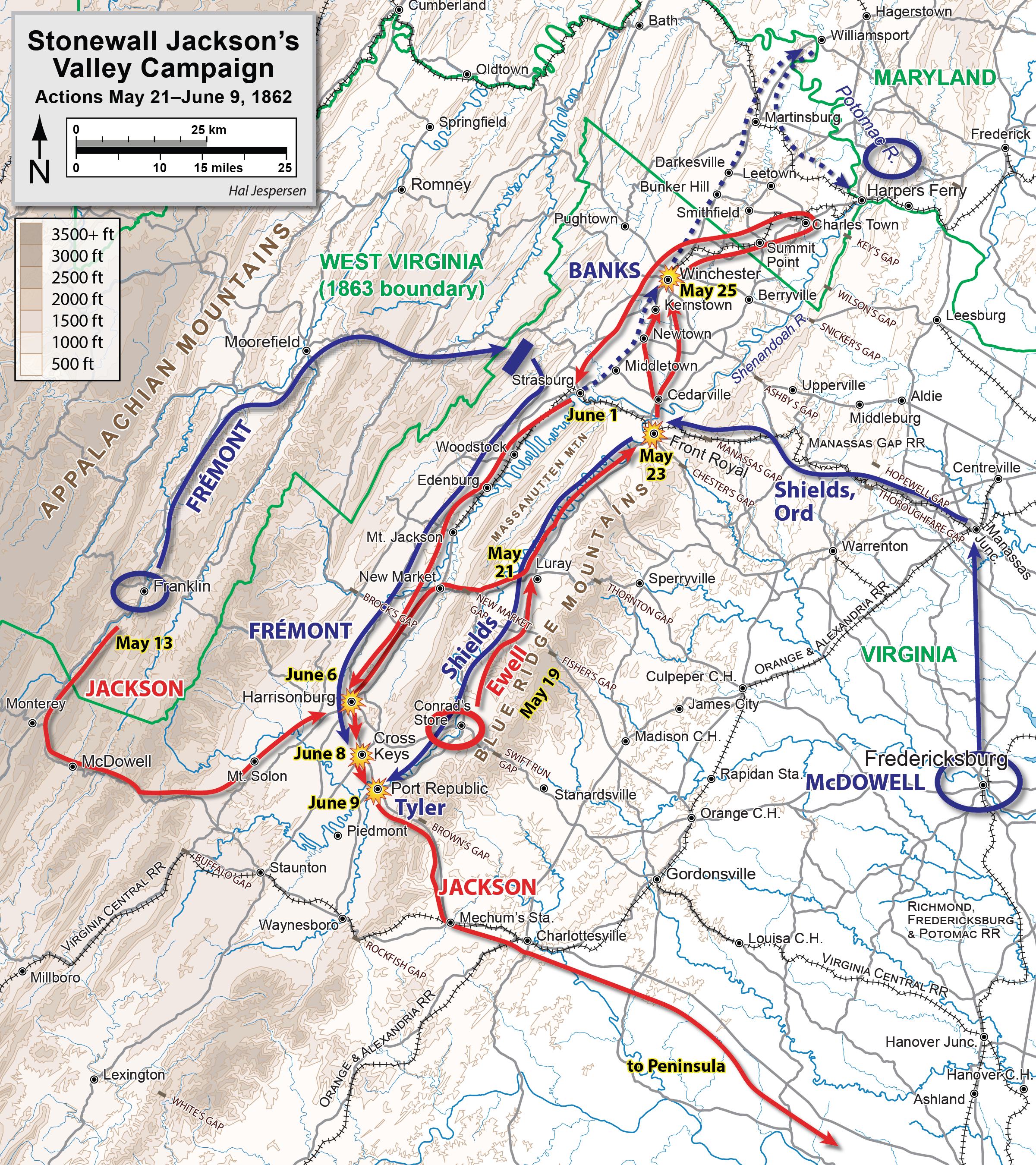
Jackson's Valley Campaign: Front Royal to Port Republic. Confederate Union

During the night of June 8–9, 1862, Brig. Gen. Charles S. Winder's Stonewall Brigade was withdrawn from its forward position near Bogota (a large house owned by Jacob Strayer) and rejoined Jackson's division at Port Republic. Confederate pioneers built a bridge of wagons across the South Fork of the Shenandoah River at Port Republic. Winder's brigade was assigned the task of spearheading the assault against Union forces east of the river. Brig. Gen. Isaac R. Trimble's brigade and elements of Col. John M. Patton, Jr.'s, were left to delay Maj. Gen. John C. Frémont's forces at Cross Keys, while the rest of Maj. Gen. Richard S. Ewell's division marched to Port Republic to be in position to support Winder's attack.

Brig. Gen. Erastus B. Tyler's brigade joined Col. Samuel Carroll's brigade north of Lewiston on the Luray Road. The rest of Brig. Gen. James Shields's division was strung out along the muddy roads back to Luray. General Tyler, in command on the field, advanced at dawn of June 9 to the vicinity of Lewiston. He anchored the left of his line on a battery positioned on the Lewiston Coaling, extending his infantry west along Lewiston Lane to the South Fork near the site of Lewis's Mill. The right and center were supported by artillery, 16 guns in all.

== Battle ==
Battle of Port Republic.

Winder's brigade crossed the river by 5 a.m. and deployed to attack east across the bottomland. Winder sent two regiments (2nd Virginia and 4th Virginia) into the woods to flank the Union line and assault the Coaling. When the main Confederate battle line advanced, it came under heavy fire from the Union artillery and was soon pinned down. Confederate batteries were brought forward onto the plain but were outgunned and forced to seek safer positions. Ewell's brigades were hurried forward to cross the river. Seeing the strength of the Union artillery at the Coaling, Jackson sent Richard Taylor's brigade (including the famed Louisiana Tigers) to the right into the woods to support the flanking column that was attempting to advance through the thick underbrush.

Winder's brigade renewed its assault on the Union right and center, taking heavy casualties. General Tyler moved two regiments from the Coaling to his right and launched a counterattack, driving Confederate forces back nearly half a mile. While this was occurring, the first Confederate regiments probed the defenses of the Coaling, but were repulsed.

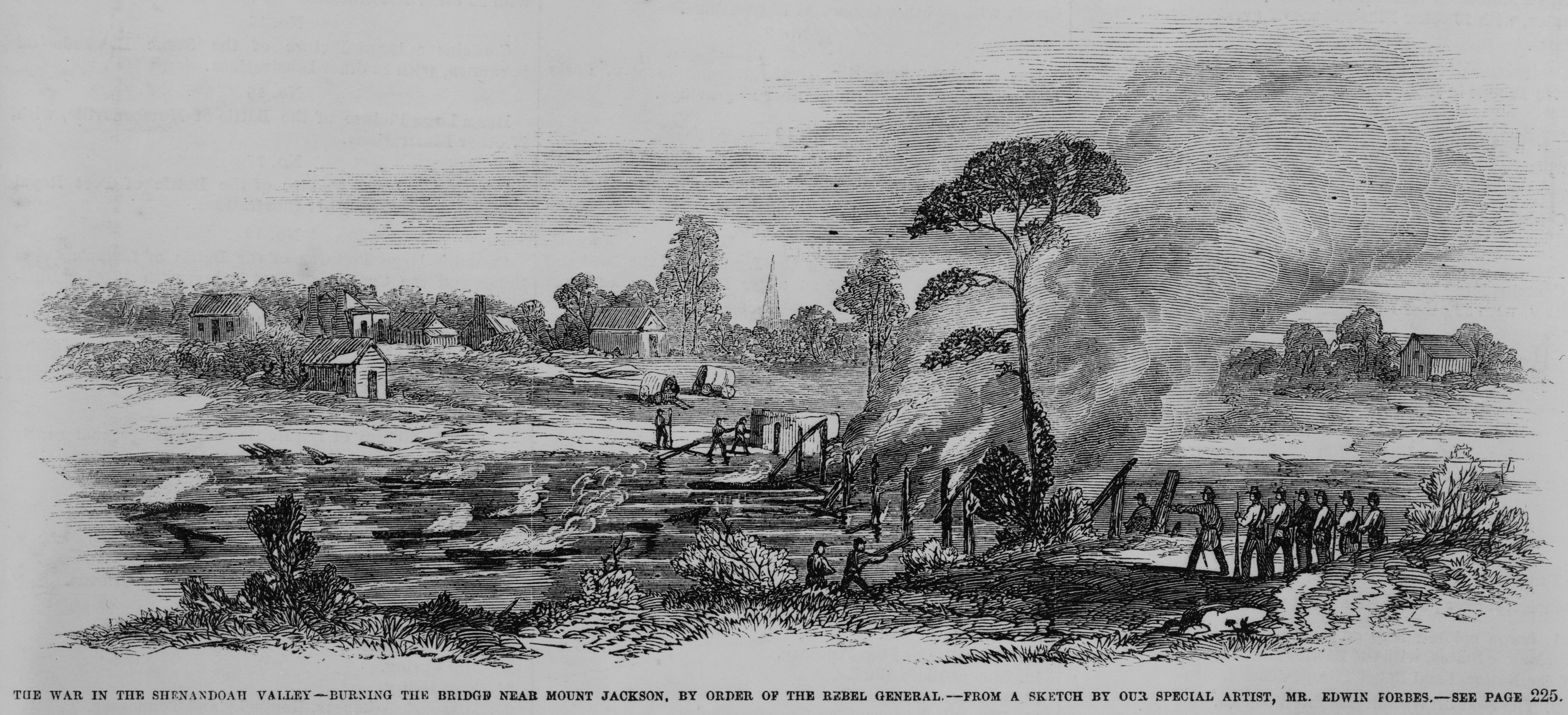
The war in the Shenandoah Valley - burning the bridge near Mount Jackson, by order of the Rebel General, sketched by Edwin Forbes

Finding resistance fiercer than anticipated, Jackson ordered the last of Ewell's forces still north of Port Republic to cross the rivers and burn the North Fork bridge. These reinforcements began to reach Winder, strengthening his line and stopping the Union counterattack. Taylor's brigade reached a position in the woods across from the Coaling and launched a fierce attack, which carried the hill, capturing five guns. Tyler immediately responded with a counterattack, using his reserves. These regiments, in hand-to-hand fighting, retook the position. Taylor shifted a regiment to the far right to outflank the Union battle line. The Confederate attack again surged forward to capture the Coaling. Five captured guns were turned against the rest of the Union line. With the loss of the Coaling, the Union position along Lewiston Lane became untenable, and Tyler ordered a withdrawal about 10:30 a.m. Jackson ordered a general advance.

William B. Taliaferro's fresh Confederate brigade arrived from Port Republic and pressed the retreating Federals for several miles north along the Luray Road, taking several hundred prisoners. The Confederate army was left in possession of the field. Shortly after noon, Frémont's army began to deploy on the west bank of the South Fork, too late to aid Tyler's defeated command, and watched helplessly from across the rain-swollen river. Frémont deployed artillery on the high bluffs to harass the Confederate forces. Jackson gradually withdrew along a narrow road through the woods and concentrated his army in the vicinity of Mt. Vernon Furnace. Jackson expected Frémont to cross the river and attack him on the following day, but during the night Frémont withdrew toward Harrisonburg.

== Aftermath ==
After the dual defeats at Cross Keys and Port Republic, the Union armies retreated, leaving Jackson in control of the upper and middle Shenandoah Valley and freeing his army to reinforce Robert E. Lee before Richmond in the Seven Days Battles.

== Battlefield preservation ==
The Civil War Trust (a division of the American Battlefield Trust) and its partners have acquired and preserved 947 acres (3.83 km^{2}) of the Port Republic battlefield in seven transactions since 1988. The battlefield is located about three miles east of Port Republic at U.S. Route 340 and Ore Bank Road. It retains its wartime agrarian appearance. The Port Republic Battle Monument is on Ore Bank Road beside the site of The Coaling, a key battlefield feature. The Coaling was the first land acquisition of the modern Civil War battlefield preservation movement. The 8.55-acre site was donated to the Trust's forerunner, the Association for the Preservation of Civil War Sites (the founding battlefield preservation organization) by the Lee-Jackson Foundation in 1988.

== Bibliography ==
- Allen, William (1995). Stonewall Jackson's Valley Campaign: From November 4, 1861 to June 17, 1862 (eBook). New York: Smithmark Publishers. p. 284. ISBN 978-0831714321. OCLC 33418359.
- Avirett, James Battle (1867). The Memoirs of General Turner Ashby and His Compeers (PDF). Baltimore, MD: Selby & Dulany. p. 408. ISBN 978-0608347080. OCLC 3184269. This article incorporates text from this source, which is in the public domain.
- Clark, Champ (1984). Decoying the Yanks: Jackson's Valley Campaign. The Civil War. Alexandria, VA: Time Life Books. ISBN 080944724X. OCLC 473681924.
- Cozzens, Peter (2008). Shenandoah 1862: Stonewall Jackson's Valley Campaign (Kindle). Civil War America (2013 Kindle ed.). Chapel Hill: The University of North Carolina Press. ISBN 978-1469605234. OCLC 1100952647.
- Douglas, Henry Kyd (1940). I Rode with Stonewall (PDF) (1993 R. Bemis Pub. ed.). Chapel Hill: The University of North Carolina Press. p. 384. ISBN 978-0891760405. OCLC 6619133.
- Dyer, Frederick H (1908). A Compendium of the War of the Rebellion (PDF). Des Moines, IA: Dyer Pub. Co. ASIN B01BUFJ76Q. OCLC 8697590. This article incorporates text from this source, which is in the public domain.
- Eicher, David J.; McPherson, James M.; McPherson, James Alan (2001). The Longest Night: A Military History of the Civil War. New York: Simon & Schuster. ISBN 0743218469. OCLC 892938160.
- Emberton, Keith D., MAJ USA (1996). Joint Military Operations Department (ed.). Operational Leadership Once Beyond the Culminating Point: Perspectives on Calculated Tactical Risk to Achieve Operational Success (PDF). Alexandria, VA: United States Naval War College. p. 28. OCLC 38196522. Archived (PDF) from the original on 2012-09-28. This article incorporates text from this source, which is in the public domain.
- Esposito, Vincent J. (1959). West Point Atlas of American Wars. Vol. 1: 1689–1900 (1st ed.). New York: Frederick A. Praeger Publishers. OCLC 5890637. This article incorporates text from this source, which is in the public domain.
- Freeman, Douglas Southall (1970) [1946]. Manassas to Malvern Hill (PDF). Lee's Lieutenants: A Study in Command. Vol. I. New York: Charles Scribner's Sons. p. 773. ISBN 978-0684187488. OCLC 1035890441.
- Gallagher, Gary W.; Berkey, Jonathan M.; Bohannon, Keith S.; Carmichael, Peter S.; Koeniger, A. Cash; Krick, R. E. L.; Krick, Robert K.; Miller, William J. (2010). Gary W. Gallagher (ed.). The Shenandoah Valley Campaign of 1862 (Kindle). Military Campaigns of the Civil War (Kindle ed.). Chapel Hill, NC: University of North Carolina Press. p. 280. ISBN 978-0807857687. OCLC 929629850.
- Henderson, George Francis Robert (1898). Stonewall Jackson and the American Civil War (PDF). Vol. I. London: Longmans, Green, and Company. p. 648. OCLC 1085324715. This article incorporates text from this source, which is in the public domain.
- Hotchkiss, Jedediah (1973). Archie P. MacDonald (ed.). Make Me a Map of the Valley: The Civil War Journal of Stonewall Jackson's Topographer (PDF). Dallas: Southern Methodist University Press. p. 352. ISBN 0870741373. OCLC 462213398.
- Johnson, Robert Underwood; Buel, Clarence Clough (1887). Robert Underwood Johnson; Clarence Clough Buel (eds.). The Opening Battles. Battles and Leaders of the Civil War: Being for the Most Part Contributions by Union and Confederate officers: Based upon "The Century War Series". Vol. I. New York: The Century Company. p. 784. OCLC 48764702. This article incorporates text from this source, which is in the public domain.
- Kennedy, Frances H., ed. (1998). The Civil War Battlefield Guide (2nd ed.). Boston: Houghton Mifflin Co. ISBN 0395740126.
- Krick, Robert K. (1996). Conquering the Valley: Stonewall Jackson at Port Republic (PDF). New York: William Morrow & Co. p. 594. ISBN 978-0688112820. OCLC 1148596552.
- McPherson, James M. (1988). Battle Cry of Freedom: The Civil War Era (PDF). Oxford History of the United States. Oxford: Oxford University Press. p. 904. ISBN 978-0195038637. OCLC 7577667.
- Martin, David G. (1988). Jackson's Valley Campaign: November 1861 – June 1862 (PDF). New York: Gallery Books. p. 184. ISBN 978-0914373148. OCLC 1194435392.
- Miller, William J. (1993). Mapping for Stonewall: The Civil War Service of Jed Hotchkiss. Washington, DC: Elliott & Clark Pub. p. 176. ISBN 978-1880216118.
- Robertson, James I. Jr. (1997). Stonewall Jackson: The Man, The Soldier, The Legend (PDF). London: Prentice Hall International. p. 950. ISBN 978-0028646855. OCLC 1151321680.
- Salmon, John S. (2001). The Official Virginia Civil War Battlefield Guide. Mechanicsburg, PA: Stackpole Books. ISBN 0811728684.
- Tanner, Robert G (1976). Stonewall in the Valley: Thomas J. "Stonewall" Jackson's Shenandoah Valley Campaign, Spring 1862 (PDF). Garden City, NY: Doubleday. ISBN 0385121482. OCLC 1036885979.
- U.S. War Department (1885). Reports, Mar 17 – Jun 25; Operations in Northern Virginia, West Virginia, and Maryland. Mar 17 – Sep 2, 1862. The War of the Rebellion: A Compilation of the Official Records of the Union and Confederate Armies. Vol. XII–XXIV-I. Washington, DC: U.S. Government Printing Office. hdl:2027/coo.31924077725921. OCLC 427057. This article incorporates text from this source, which is in the public domain.
- U.S. War Department (1885). Reports, Jun 26 – Sep 2; Operations in Northern Virginia, West Virginia, and Maryland. Mar 17 – Sep 2, 1862. The War of the Rebellion: A Compilation of the Official Records of the Union and Confederate Armies. Vol. XII–XXIV-II. Washington, DC: U.S. Government Printing Office. hdl:2027/coo.31924077728222. OCLC 427057. This article incorporates text from this source, which is in the public domain.
- Welcher, Frank J. (1989). The Eastern Theater. The Union Army, 1861–1865: Organization and Operations. Vol. 1. Bloomington: Indiana University Press. p. 1084. ISBN 978-0253364531. OCLC 799063447.
- National Park Service battle description This article incorporates text from this source, which is in the public domain.
- NPS report on battlefield condition This article incorporates text from this source, which is in the public domain.
- CWSAC Report Update This article incorporates text from this source, which is in the public domain.
