= Timberville, Virginia =

- Town
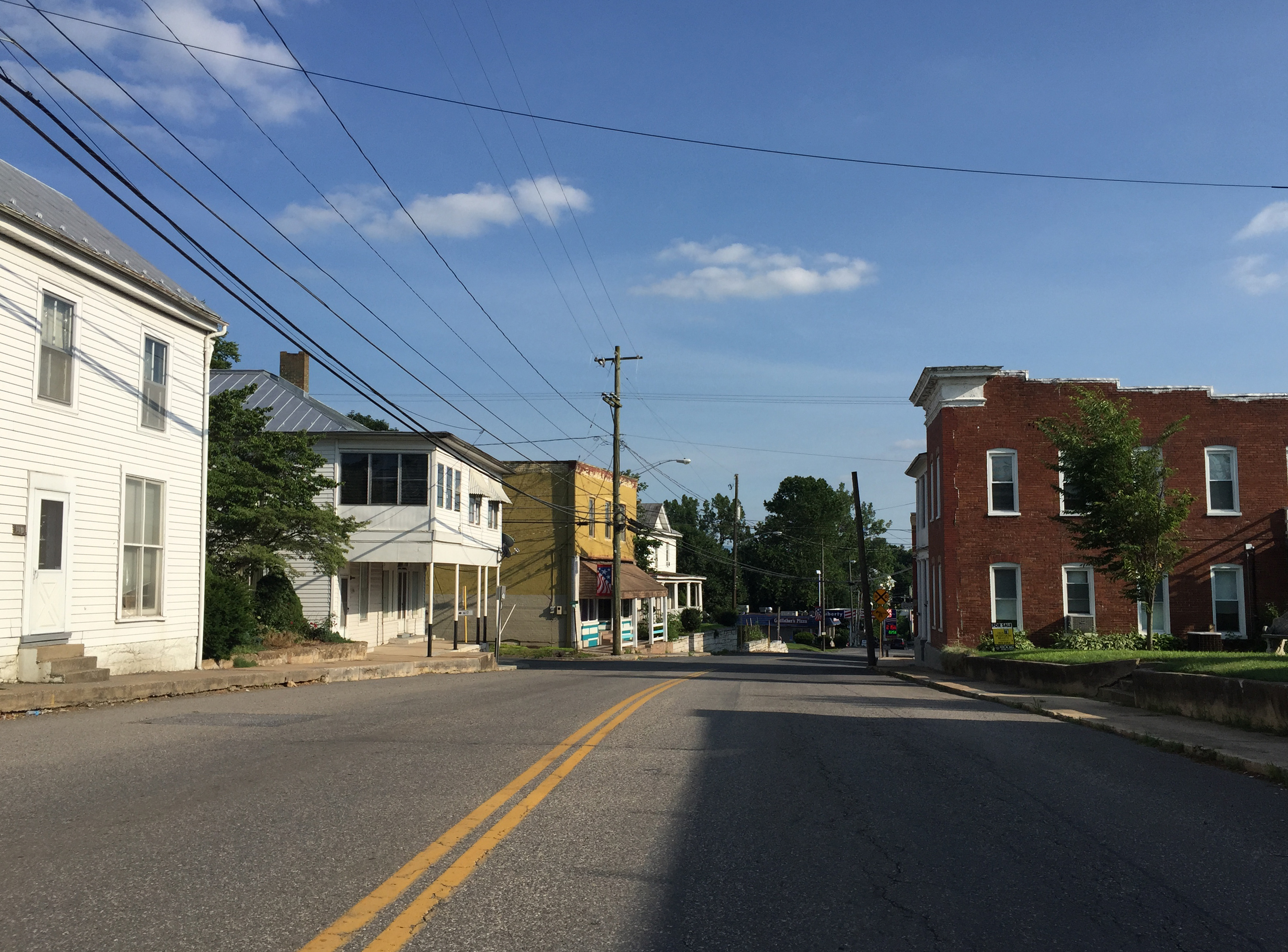
- Main Street in Timberville

- Location of Timberville within Rockingham County

- Location within the state of Virginia Timberville, Virginia (the United States)
- Coordinates: 38°38′3″N 78°46′35″W
- Country: United States
- State: Virginia
- County: Rockingham
- Incorporated: 1884

Government
  - Type: Council-manager government
  - Town Manager: Austin C. Garber II
  - Mayor: Donald Delaughty
  - Town Council: Council Members: Clarence L. Fox (I); Debra J. Jessup (I); Sharon Jones (I); Ned Overton (I); Natalie Sherlock (I); Carl Turner, Jr. (I)

Area
  - Total: 1.36 sq mi (3.51 km^{2})
  - Land: 1.34 sq mi (3.46 km^{2})
  - Water: 0.019 sq mi (0.05 km^{2})
- Elevation: 1,020 ft (310 m)

Population (2010)
  - Total: 2,963
  - Estimate (2019): 2,691
  - Density: 2,013.6/sq mi (777.45/km^{2})
- Time zone: UTC−5 (Eastern (EST))
  - Summer (DST): UTC−4 (EDT)
- ZIP code: 22853
- Area code: 540
- FIPS code: 51-78736
- GNIS feature ID: 1500227
- Website: www.townoftimberville.com

Timberville is a town in Rockingham County, Virginia, United States. As of the 2020 census, Timberville had a population of 2,963. It is part of the Harrisonburg metropolitan area.

== History ==
Prior to European colonization, the land upon which Timberville sits was inhabited by Indigenous peoples for thousands of years. A burial mound two feet high, built on a slight natural elevation near the left bank of the Shenandoah River, was located one mile north of Timberville. The mound was disturbed and examined in the 1890s.

The earliest white settlers of Timberville were mostly Pennsylvania Dutch who migrated to the Shenandoah Valley.

== Geography ==
Timberville is located at 38°38′3″N 78°46′35″W (38.634273, −78.776422).

According to the United States Census Bureau, the town has a total area of 0.9 square mile (2.3 km^{2}), all land.

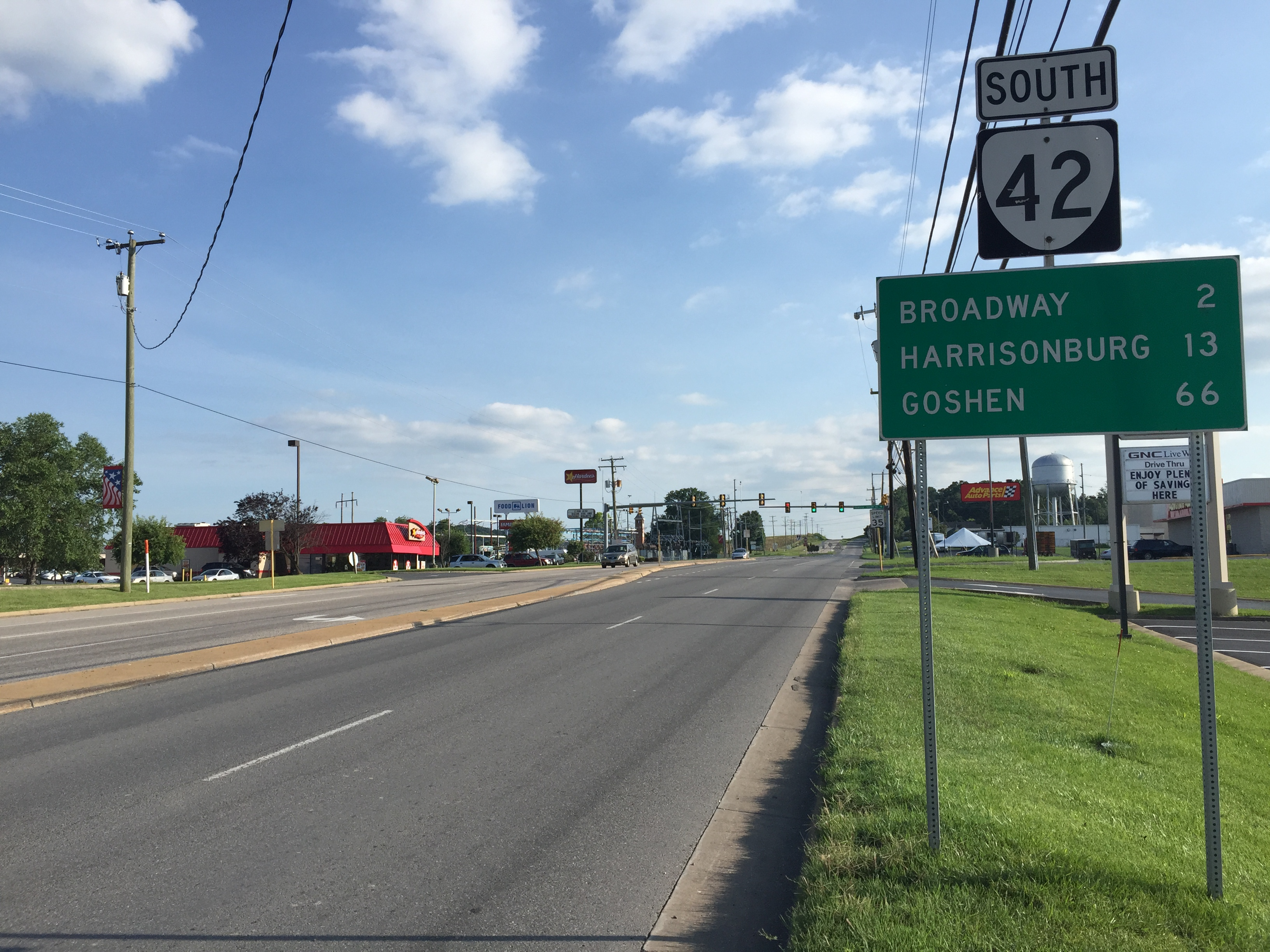
View south along SR 42 in Timberville

== Transportation ==
The primary roads providing access to Timberville are SR 42 and SR 211. SR 42 heads north and south, connecting to SR 259 in Broadway to the south. To the north, SR 42 heads mostly through rural areas of southwestern Shenandoah County. SR 211 heads east from Timberville, connecting to I-81 and US 211 in New Market.

== Demographics ==
Historical population
Census	Pop.	Note	%±
1880	112		—
1900	173		—
1910	240		38.7%
1920	277		15.4%
1930	302		9.0%
1940	253		−16.2%
1950	271		7.1%
1960	412		52.0%
1970	959		132.8%
1980	1,510		57.5%
1990	1,596		5.7%
2000	1,739		9.0%
2010	2,522		45.0%
2020	2,963		17.5%
U.S. Decennial Census

At the 2000 census 1,739 people, 735 households, and 465 families resided in the town. The population density was 1,968.1 per square mile (763.0/km^{2}). There were 770 housing units at an average density of 871.5 per square mile (337.8/km^{2}). The racial makeup of the town was 97.35% White, 0.17% African American, 0.12% Native American, 0.17% Asian, 1.21% from other races, and 0.98% from two or more races. Hispanic or Latino of any race were 4.31% of the population. 30% of Timberville's residents were German, 11% English, 8% Irish, 3% Mexican, and 2% Dutch. Scotch-Irish, Italians, Russians, Scottish, French, Swiss, Polish, French Canadians and Yugoslavs each constituted 1%.

Of the 735 households 27.5% had children under the age of 18 living with them, 47.8% were married couples living together, 12.0% had a female householder with no husband present, and 36.7% were non-families. 32.4% of households were one person and 17.6% were one person aged 65 or older. The average household size was 2.29 and the average family size was 2.89.

The age distribution was 22.0% under the age of 18, 7.2% from 18 to 24, 27.9% from 25 to 44, 21.6% from 45 to 64, and 21.3% 65 or older. The median age was 40 years. For every 100 females, there were 86.2 males. For every 100 females aged 18 and over, there were 78.0 males.

The median household income was $33,750 and the median family income was $41,417. Males had a median income of $27,230 versus $19,099 for females. The per capita income for the town was $16,450. About 7.2% of families and 10.9% of the population were below the poverty line, including 12.8% of those under age 18 and 17.7% of those age 65 or over.
