= Virginia State Route 42 =

State highway in Virginia, US

State Route 42

- Segments of SR 42 highlighted in red

Route information
- Maintained by VDOT
- Length: 210.29 mi (338.43 km)
- Existed: 1928–present
- Tourist routes: Virginia Byway

Broadford – Poplar Hill
- Length: 61.63 mi (99.18 km)
- South end: SR 91 in Broadford
- Major intersections: I-77 in Bland; US 52 in Bland
- North end: SR 100 in Poplar Hill

Newport – New Castle
- Length: 29.43 mi (47.36 km)
- South end: US 460 / SR 605 in Newport
- North end: SR 311 / SR 615 in New Castle

Nicelytown–Woodstock
- Length: 119.23 mi (191.88 km)
- South end: SR 269 / SR 632 near Nicelytown
- Major intersections: I-64 / US 60 near Nicelytown; US 250 in Churchville; US 33 in Harrisonburg; I-81 in Woodstock
- North end: US 11 / SR 670 in Woodstock

Location
- Country: United States
- State: Virginia
- Counties: Smyth, Bland, Giles, Craig, Alleghany, Bath, Rockbridge, Augusta, Rockingham, City of Harrisonburg, Shenandoah

Highway system
- Virginia Routes; Interstate; US; Primary; Secondary; Byways; History; HOT lanes
← SR 41	→ SR 43

State Route 42 (SR 42) is a primary state highway in the U.S. state of Virginia. Running parallel to and west of Interstate 81, SR 42 consists of three sections, with gaps filled by secondary routes in between. Some of SR 42 lies along the old Fincastle Turnpike. Another major piece, from near Clifton Forge to Buffalo Gap, parallels the old Virginia Central Railroad.

== Route description ==
=== Smyth County ===
SR 42 begins at State Route 91 at Broadford, where SR 91 turns north to cross Brushy Mountain. SR 42 continues the east-northeasterly path of SR 91 through the valleys formed by the North Fork Holston River, crossing State Route 16 at Black Hill.

=== Bland County ===
SR 42 continues past Groseclose Store and Ceres, meeting State Route 623 at Sharon Springs, the source of the North Fork Holston River. A low crossing of the Tennessee Valley Divide at about 2,850 feet (870 m) takes SR 42 into the valleys formed by Walker Creek. After passing Effna, SR 42 joins U.S. Route 52 as that route comes down from its Big Walker Mountain crossing. SR 42 crosses Interstate 77 as it approaches Bland, and, in Bland, it meets State Route 98 and parts ways with US 52, still heading east-northeast near Walker Creek. SR 42 passes Point Pleasant and Crandon, and meets State Route 738 at Mechanicsburg, before crossing Kimberling Creek, a tributary of Walker Creek, and then entering Giles County.

=== Giles County ===
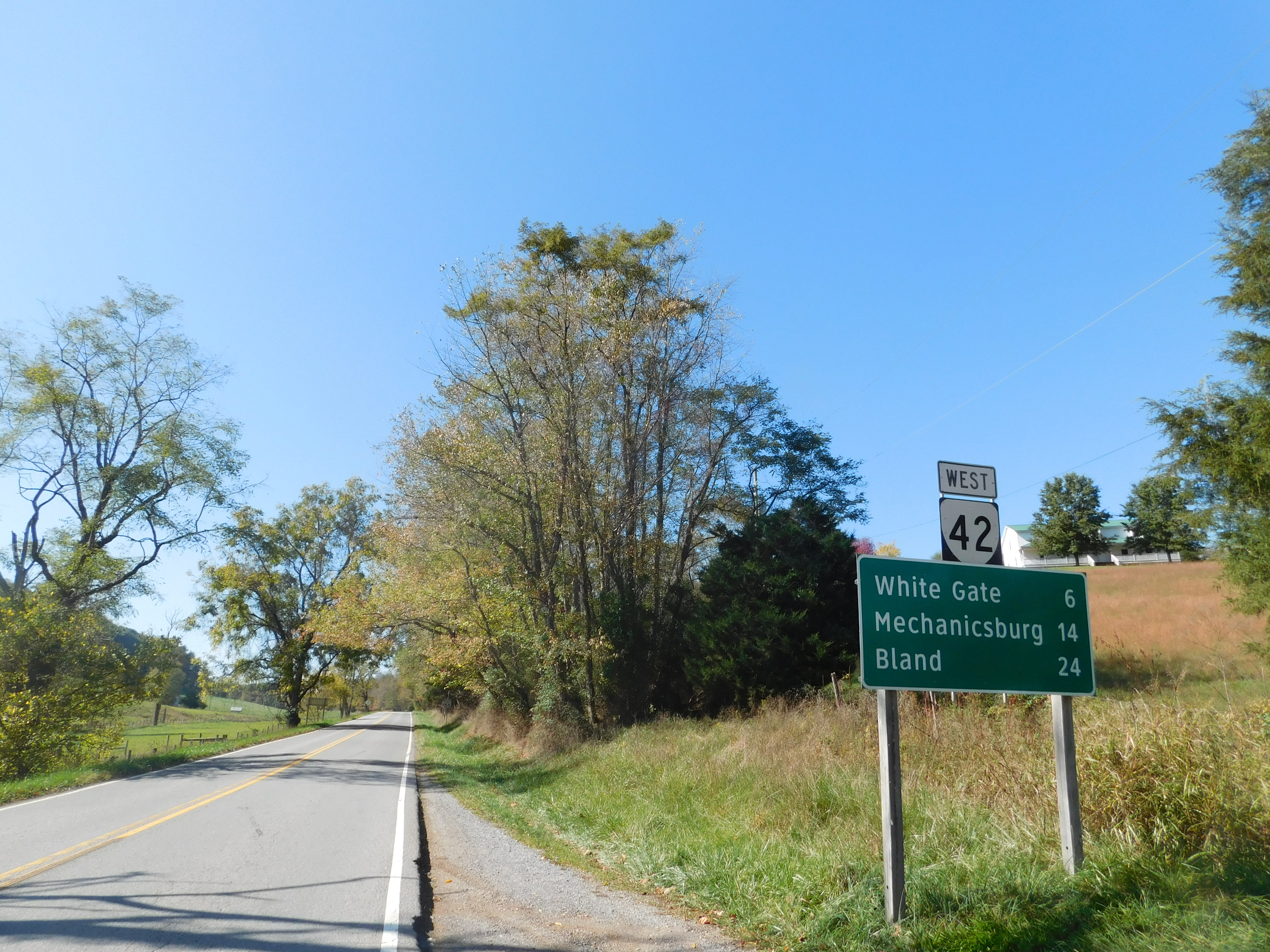
SR 42 westbound from SR 100 in Poplar Hill

SR 42 continues to follow Walker Creek through Giles County, passing White Gate before ending at State Route 100 at Poplar Hill.

SR 42 formerly turned north on SR 100, following Walker Creek northeast to Staffordsville. There it turned east on current State Route 730 (now connected to SR 100 via SR 750, an old alignment of SR 100), following some smaller brooks and passing over a summit on its way to Eggleston, where it crossed the New River. SR 730 continues through a rather hilly area from Eggleston to its end at U.S. Route 460, from which US 460 follows Sinking Creek past Maybrook to the next piece of SR 42 near Newport.

SR 42 begins again at U.S. Route 460 near Newport. It crosses old US 460 in Newport and begins following Sinking Creek in a general east-northeasterly direction.

=== Craig County ===
After entering Craig County, SR 42 passes the communities of Huffman, Simmonsville, and Sinking Creek, the creek with that name ending soon after. SR 42 then crosses a summit at 2,704 feet (0.824 km) and begins to parallel Meadow Creek past Looney to Meadow Creek Falls, where it reaches its first twisty section. It descends through a gap between Sinking Creek Mountain and Johns Creek Mountain and down the slopes of Johns Creek Mountain into the town of New Castle, where it ends again at State Route 311. This descent takes it from 2,570 feet (780 m) at Looney down to 1,310 feet (400 m) in New Castle.

SR 42 once continued northeast on State Route 615, part of the way to U.S. Route 220 near Eagle Rock. (The gap was never completely filled, and part of SR 615 was State Route 43.) This route generally parallels Craig Creek, which takes the waters of Meadow Creek from New Castle into the James River at Eagle Rock. From Eagle Rock, which is in Botetourt County, U.S. Route 220 heads north, mostly along the James River, to Cliftondale Park (east of Clifton Forge) in Alleghany County. There, US 220 joins Interstate 64/U.S. Route 60 to the west, but the old SR 42 heads east on old US 60 (State Route 670 and State Route 632) over a summit at about 1,220 feet (0.37 km) to State Route 269.

=== Alleghany County ===
The third—and longest—piece of SR 42 begins where old U.S. Route 60 becomes State Route 269. SR 42 begins by heading north, along with SR 269, to exit 29 of Interstate 64/US 60. There SR 269 ends, while SR 42 heads north-northeasterly, generally following the Cowpasture River past Nicelytown and into Bath County.

=== Bath County ===
SR 42 continues near the Cowpasture River past Nimrod Hall to State Route 39 at Millboro Springs. It turns east with SR 39, rising from about 1,300 feet (0.40 km) at Millboro Springs to about 1,780 feet (0.54 km) near Hotchkiss. There the ground levels out, and the combined SR 39 and SR 42 continue east, paralleling Mill Creek into Rockbridge County at Panther Gap.

=== Rockbridge County ===
SR 39 and SR 42 continue to parallel Mill Creek from Panther Gap into Goshen, where SR 39 splits to the southwest and SR 42 turns northeast, crossing the Calfpasture River. It runs alongside some small creeks on its way to Bells Valley, and continues to follow small creeks into Augusta County.

=== Augusta County ===
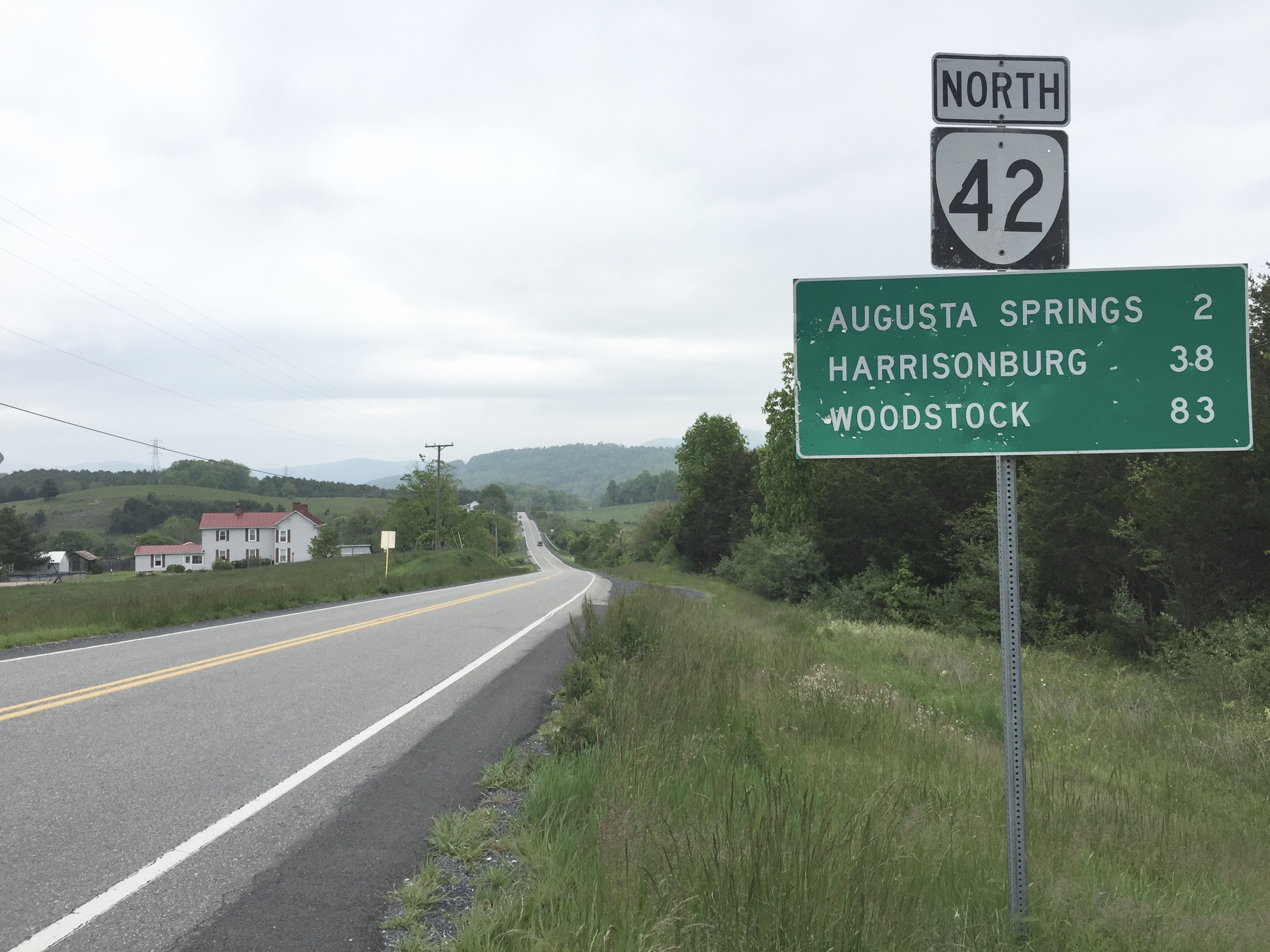
View north along SR 42 near Craigsville, Augusta County

SR 42 passes through Craigsville, Following the Little Calfpasture River from there past Augusta Springs and Mount Elliott Springs to Chapin. It crosses a summit of 2,125 feet (648 m) at North Mountain and then follows Buffalo Branch through Buffalo Gap to the west end of State Route 254.

Once SR 42 passes through Buffalo Gap, the land is flatter, and the road heads cross-country, still in a north-northeasterly direction, past Churchville (where it crosses U.S. Route 250), Stover, Parnassus, Moscow, Mount Solon, and Mossy Creek.

=== Rockingham County ===
SR 42 continues through Bridgewater, where State Route 257 joins it from the east, to Dayton. State Route 42 Business follows the old road through Dayton, and SR 257 leaves to the west, while State Route 290 crosses there. Then SR 42 enters the city of Harrisonburg on High Street. It passes straight through Harrisonburg from High Street across U.S. Route 33 (Market Street) onto Virginia Avenue, leaving the city to the north.

SR 42 continues in its north-northeasterly direction from Harrisonburg, passing Edom, Broadway (where it crosses State Route 259), and Timberville (where it weets the west end of State Route 211 and crosses the North Fork Shenandoah River, which also passes through Broadway).

=== Shenandoah County ===
At Forestville, SR 42 turns to the northwest until Getz Corner, where it again turns north-northeasterly. It passes Hudson Crossroads, Conicville, Davey Hill, and Columbia Furnace, where it meets State Route 675, formerly part of State Route 59 west into West Virginia. At Columbia Furnace, SR 42 curves to the east, using the old SR 59 past Harmony and Calvary and across Interstate 81 to its end at U.S. Route 11 and State Route 670 in southern Woodstock.

== Major intersections ==
County	Location	mi	km	Destinations	Notes
Smyth	Broadford	0.00	0.00	SR 91 (Saltville Highway / Veterans Road) – Saltville, Tazewell	Southern terminus of southern section
Smyth		9.59	15.43	SR 16 south (B.F. Buchanan Highway) – Marion	west end of SR 16 concurrency
Smyth		9.91	15.95	SR 16 north (B.F. Buchanan Highway) – Tazewell	east end of SR 16 concurrency
Bland		33.17	53.38	US 52 south (South Scenic Highway) – Wytheville	west end of US 52 concurrency
Bland		37.14	59.77	I-77 – Bluefield, Wytheville	Exit 52 (I-77)
Bland	Bland			SR 98 south (Main Street) / SR 1007 (Jefferson Street) – Bland CH	Northern terminus of SR 98
Bland	Bland	38.05	61.24	US 52 north (Main Street) – Bluefield, WV Turnpike	east end of US 52 concurrency
Bland	Mechanicsburg			SR 738 (Byrnes Chapel Road)	former SR 99 south
Giles	Poplar Hill	61.63	99.18	SR 100 (Pulaski Giles Turnpike) to I-81 – Pearisburg, Dublin	Northern terminus of southern section
Giles	Gap in route SR 42 followed SR 730 through Eggleston until 1948				
Giles	Newport	0.00	0.00	US 460 (Virginia Avenue) / SR 605 west (Spruce Run Road)	Southern terminus of central section
Craig	New Castle	29.43	47.36	SR 311 (Salem Avenue) / SR 615 east (Main Street)	Northern terminus of central section
Gap in route
Alleghany		0.00	0.00	SR 269 east / SR 632 west (Longdale Furnace Road) – Sharon, Lexington	Southern end of SR 269 concurrency; southern terminus of northern section
Alleghany		0.18	0.29	I-64 / US 60 – Covington, Lexington	Exit 29 (I-64); northern end of SR 269 concurrency
Bath	Millboro Springs	16.64	26.78	SR 39 west (Mountain Valley Road) – Warm Springs	Southern end of SR 39 concurrency
Rockbridge	Goshen			SR 39 Alt. east (Main Street) – Lexington	
Rockbridge	Goshen	24.84	39.98	SR 39 east (Maury River Road) – Lexington	Northern end of SR 39 concurrency
Augusta	Buffalo Gap	46.05	74.11	SR 254 east (Parkersburg Turnpike) – Staunton	Western terminus of SR 254
Augusta	Churchville	51.30	82.56	US 250 east (Churchville Avenue) – Staunton	Southern end of US 250 concurrency
Augusta	Churchville	51.77	83.32	US 250 west (Churchville Avenue) – Monterey	Northern end of US 250 concurrency
Augusta	Stovers Shop			SR 728 (Stover Shop Road)	former SR 278 west
Augusta	Moscow			SR 607 (Moscow Loop / Mount Solon Road) – Mount Solon, Spring Hill	former SR 252 south
Augusta				SR 646 (Fadley Road) to US 11	former SR 256 east
Rockingham	Bridgewater	68.11	109.61	SR 257 east (Dinkel Avenue) to I-81 – Mount Crawford, Bridgewater College	Southern end of SR 257 concurrency
Rockingham	Dayton	70.84	114.01	SR 257 west / SR 42 Bus. north (Mason Street) – Ottobine, Historic District	Northern end of SR 257 concurrency; southern terminus of SR 42 Bus.
Rockingham	Dayton			SR 290 (Huffman Drive) – Dayton Business District	
Rockingham	Dayton			SR 42 Bus. south (Main Street)	Northern terminus of SR 42 Bus.
City of Harrisonburg		75.54	121.57	US 33 (West Market Street)	
Rockingham	Broadway	88.21	141.96	SR 259 Alt. east (Broadway Avenue) to US 11	Southern end of SR 259 Alt. concurrency
Rockingham	Broadway	88.73	142.80	SR 259 west (Lee Street) – West Virginia line	Northern end of SR 259 Alt. concurrency; southern end of SR 259 concurrency
Rockingham	Broadway	89.15	143.47	SR 259 east (Timberway) / SR 801 (Holsinger Road) to I-81 south / US 11	Northern end of SR 259 concurrency
Rockingham	Timberville	90.54	145.71	SR 211 east (New Market Road) / SR 1517 (Fourth Street) to I-81 / US 11 – New Market	
Shenandoah	Forestville			SR 614 (South Middle Road) / SR 767 (Quicksburg Road) to US 11 – Quicksburg	former SR 262 east
Shenandoah		102.88	165.57	SR 263 (Orkney Grade) – Basye, Orkney Springs, Mount Jackson	
Shenandoah	Columbia Furnace			SR 768 west (Union Church Road) to SR 675 / SR 623 – Saint Luke, Wolf Gap, Liberty Furnace, Jerome	former SR 59 west
Shenandoah	Woodstock	118.60	190.87	I-81 – Strasburg, Edinburg	Exit 283 (I-81)
Shenandoah	Woodstock	119.23	191.88	US 11 (South Main Street) / SR 670 (East Reservoir Road) – Woodstock, Edinburg	Northern terminus of northern section
1.000 mi = 1.609 km; 1.000 km = 0.621 mi: Concurrency terminus

== SR 42 Business ==
State Route 42 Business
- Location: Dayton

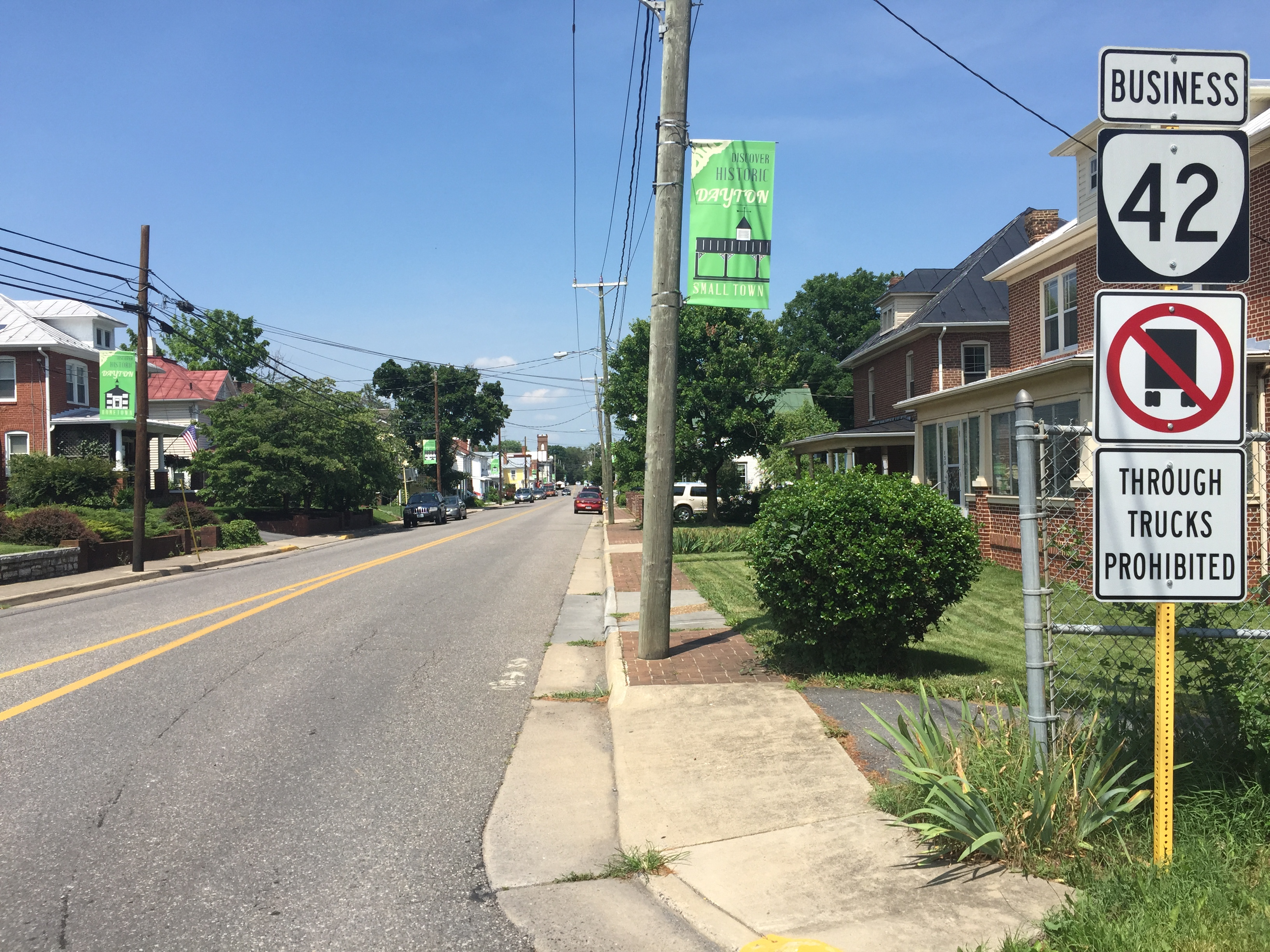
View north along SR 42 Business in Dayton

State Route 42 Business is a former segment of SR 42 that was converted into a business route that runs through downtown Dayton. It begins westbound at the northern terminus of the SR 42/257 overlap, and turns north onto Main Street less than a block later. One block north of there, the road is briefly joined by SR 701 at Huffman Drive, then carries that concurrency for three more blocks, only for that road to branch off to the north onto College Street (SR 290). The route continues to run along the northwest side of SR 42 until it finally terminates at a poultry farm just north of town.

< SR 41	Two‑digit State Routes; 1923-1933	SR 43 >
< SR 817	District 8 State Routes; 1928–1933	SR 819 >
