= Virginia State Route 211 =

State highway in northern Virginia, US

State Route 211

Route information
- Maintained by VDOT
- Length: 5.63 mi (9.06 km)
- Existed: 1977–present

Major junctions
- West end: SR 42 / SR 1517 in Timberville
- East end: I-81 / US 211 in New Market

Location
- Country: United States
- State: Virginia
- Counties: Rockingham, Shenandoah

Highway system
- Virginia Routes; Interstate; US; Primary; Secondary; Byways; History; HOT lanes
← US 211	→ SR 212

State Route 211 (SR 211) is a primary state highway in the U.S. state of Virginia. The state highway runs 5.63 miles (9.06 km) from SR 42 in Timberville east to Interstate 81 (I-81) and U.S. Route 211 (US 211) in New Market. SR 211 is a state-numbered westward extension of US 211.

== Route description ==
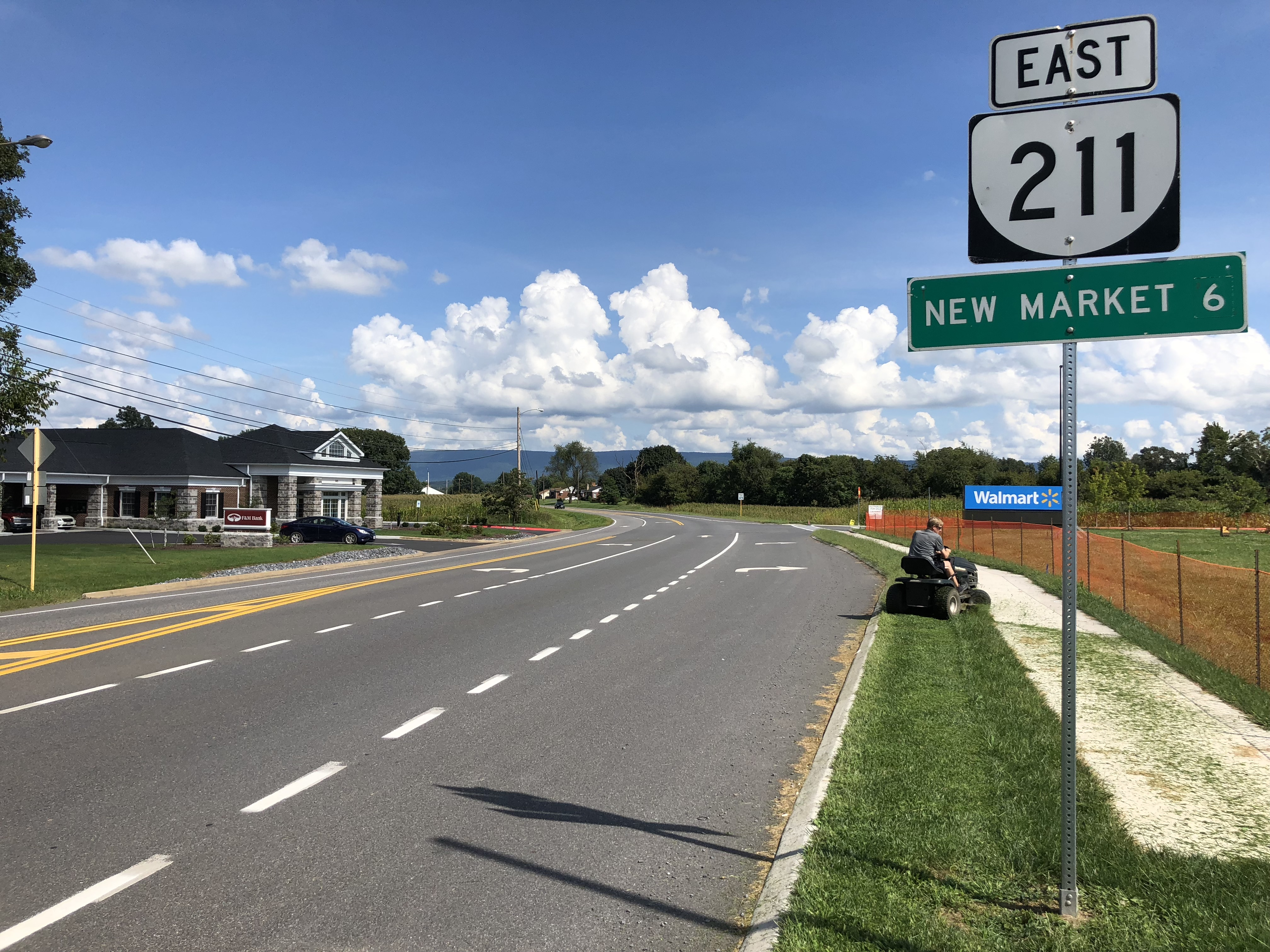
Correct signage for SR 211 just east of SR 42 in Timberville

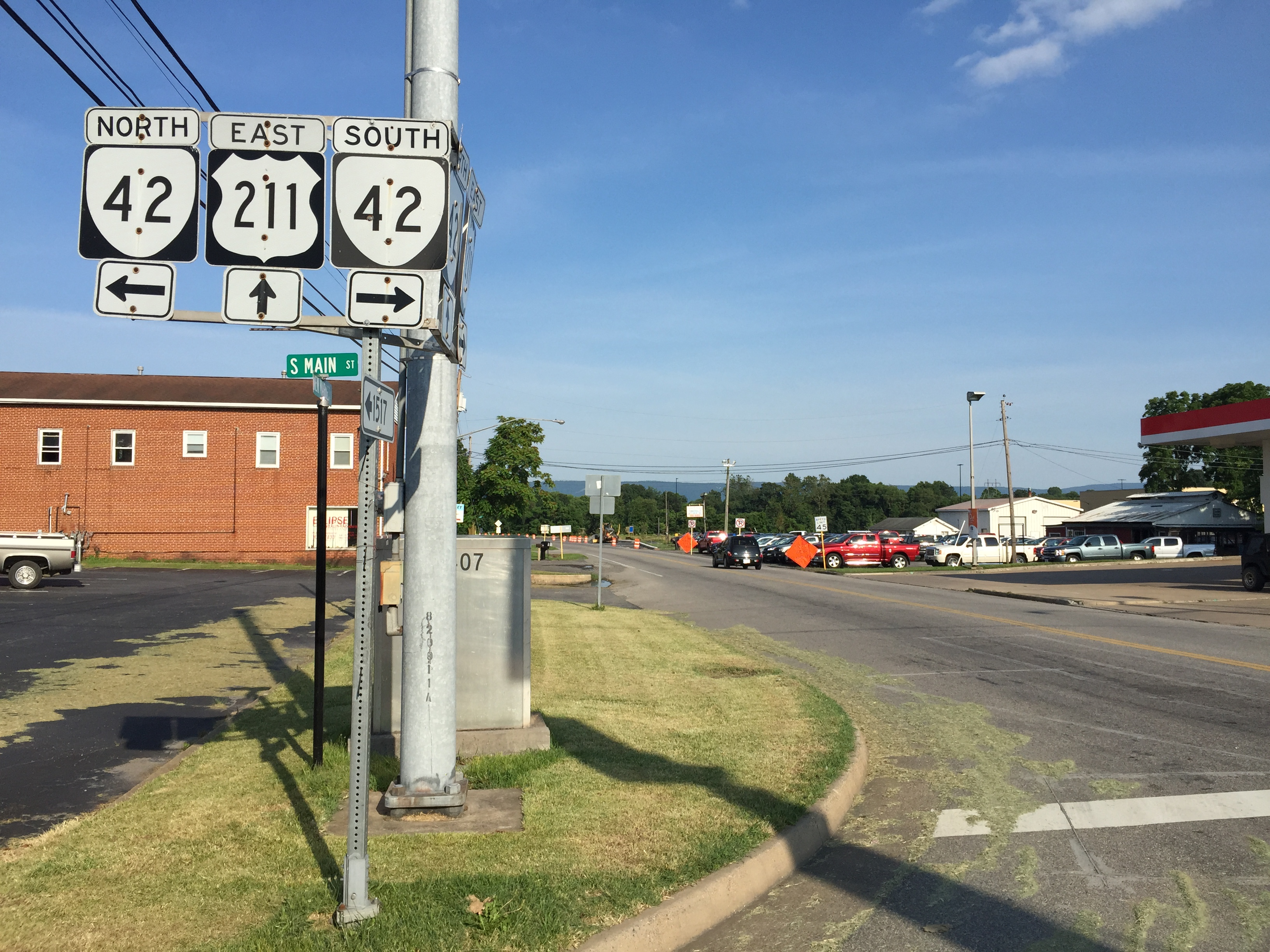
Incorrect signage for SR 211 (showing US 211 instead) at SR 42 in Timberville

SR 211 begins at an intersection with SR 42 (Main Street) in the town of Timberville. The state highway heads east as two-lane undivided New Market Road, which parallels the North Fork Shenandoah River to the south. SR 211 crosses the Rockingham–Shenandoah county line and continues as Old Cross Road. The state highway passes to the south of New Market Airport and veers away from the river before meeting the southern end of SR 305 (George Collins Parkway), which provides access to the New Market Battlefield, which commemorates the Civil War Battle of New Market. Just east of SR 305, SR 211 reaches its eastern terminus at its diamond interchange with I-81. Old Cross Road continues east as US 211, which passes through New Market before heading toward Luray and Warrenton.

== Major intersections ==
County	Location	mi	km	Destinations	Notes
Rockingham	Timberville	0.00	0.00	SR 42 (South Main Street) / SR 1517 (Fourth Street) – Broadway, Timberville	Western terminus
Shenandoah	New Market	5.53	8.90	SR 305 (George R. Collins Memorial Parkway) / SR 619 (Miller Avenue) – Battlefield Park	
Shenandoah	New Market	5.63	9.06	I-81 / US 211 east (Old Cross Road) – Mount Jackson, Staunton	I-81 exit 264; eastern terminus
1.000 mi = 1.609 km; 1.000 km = 0.621 mi
