= Addison Caldwell =

William Addison Caldwell
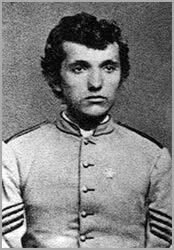
- William Addison Caldwell in Corps of Cadets Uniform (c.1870s)
- Born: January 10, 1856; Sinking Creek, VA
- Died: June 29, 1910 (aged 54); Wilmington, N.C.
- Burial place: Radford, VA
- Other names: Addison, "Addy"
- Occupation: School Teacher
- Known for: Becoming the first registered student at Virginia Agricultural and Mechanical College (V.A.M.C.) after hiking from his home in Craig County.

Academic background
- Education: Virginia Agricultural and Mechanical College (V.A.M.C.)

Academic work
- Discipline: General Studies: English, Writing, Astronomy, Geography

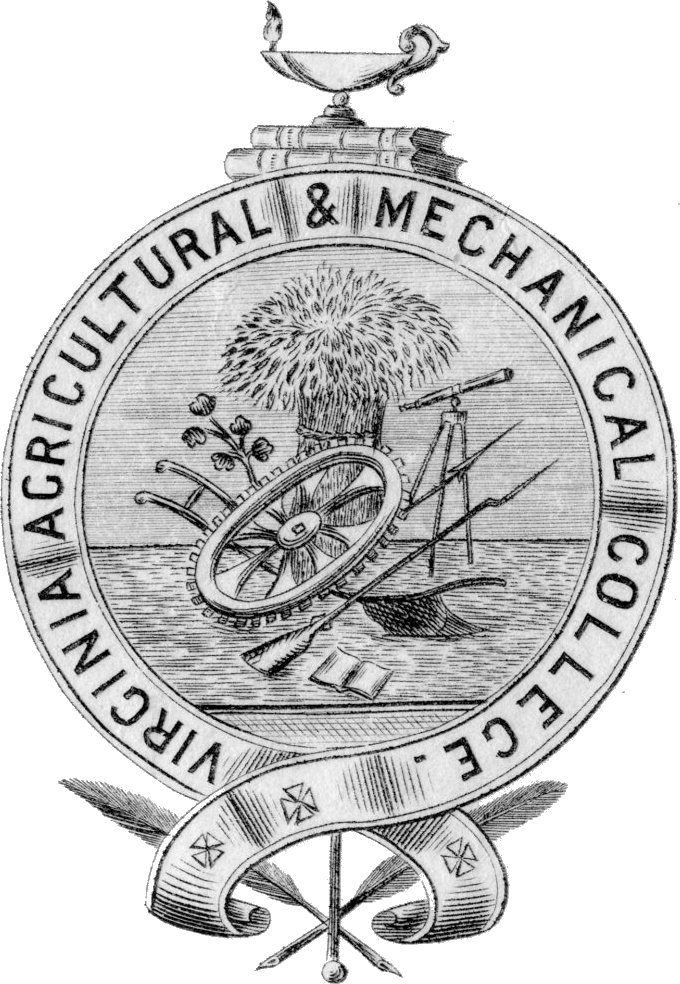
Virginia Agricultural and Mechanical College, The original name of Virginia Tech when Addison Caldwell attended.

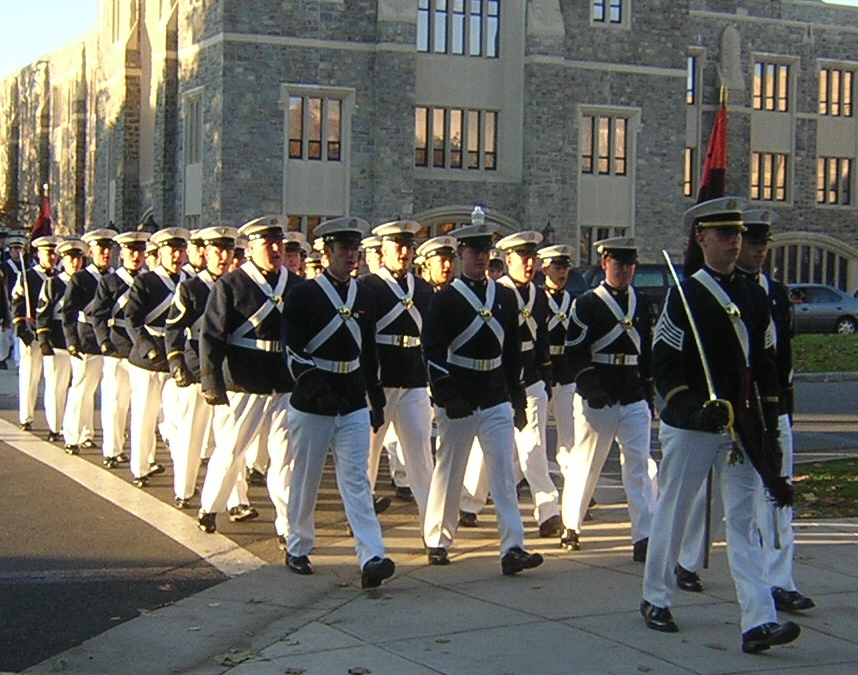
Present-day Virginia Tech Corps of Cadets. The Corps commemorates Addison Caldwell's journey with its annual "Caldwell March" hike through Jefferson National Forest.

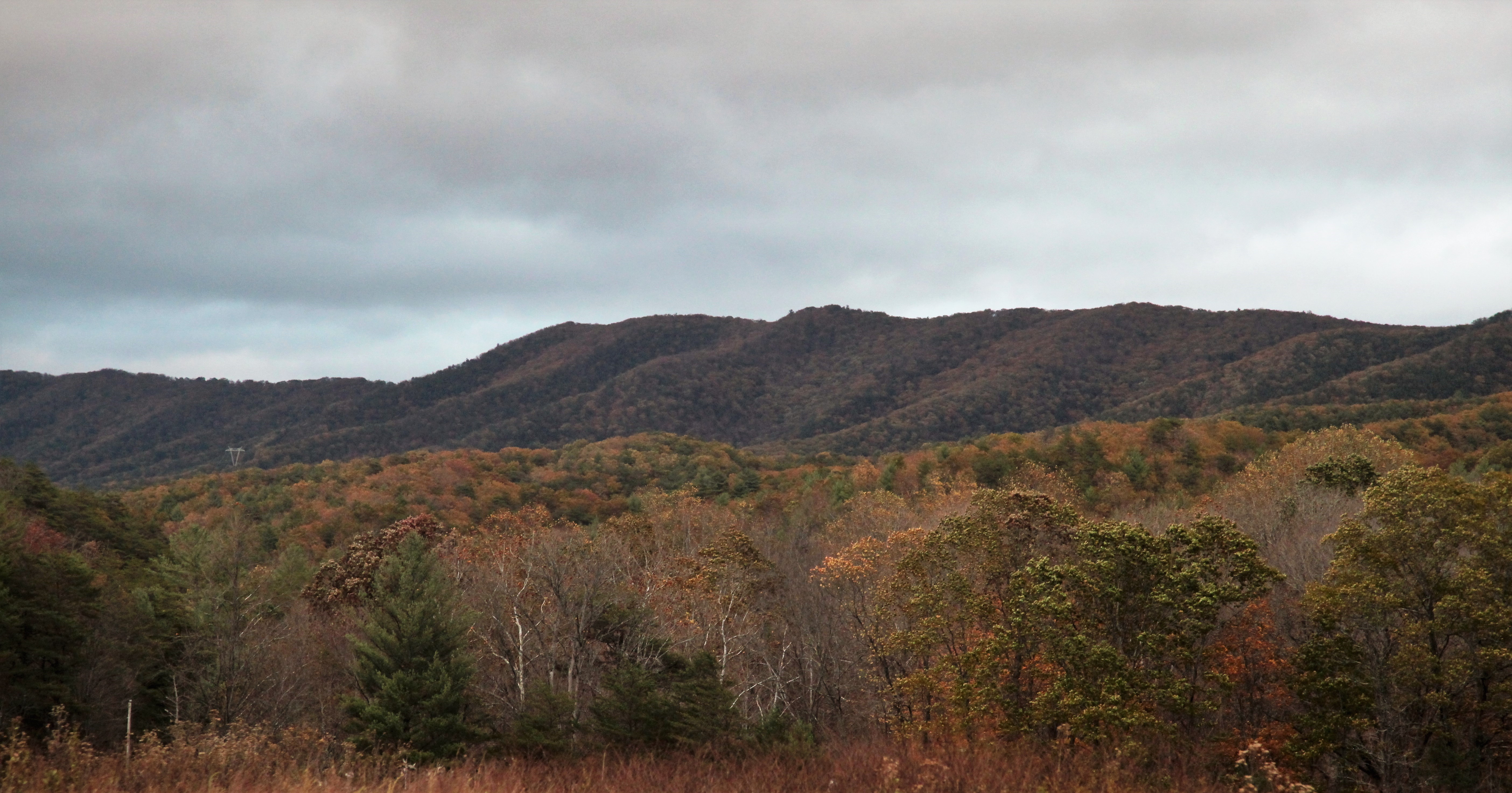
A view of Brush Mountain near Caldwell Fields in the Jefferson National Forest

William Addison Caldwell (1856–1910) became the first student to enroll in the Virginia Agricultural and Mechanical College (V.A.M.C.) in the school's inaugural year in 1872. V.A.M.C. was later named Virginia Polytechnic Institute And State University (Virginia Tech). Caldwell hiked as much as 28 miles through today's Jefferson National Forest in the Allegheny Mountains from Sinking Creek, Craig County to Blacksburg, Va. to enroll as the school's first student on October 1, 1872.

== Early life ==
William Addison ("Add") Caldwell was born on January 10, 1856, in Sinking Creek, Craig County, VA as the second of George Charlton and Lorena Givens Caldwell's nine children. Generations of the Caldwell family had lived in the area beginning in the 1760s, when King George III of Great Britain granted land to their forebear, John Caldwell. Addison's father, George and grandfather, Archibald Caldwell were both farmers and lived in a 2-story home at the base of Sinking Creek Mountain, where they raised their families.

George Caldwell, a Confederate veteran, wanted a better life for his children and encouraged their education. Addison Caldwell most likely attended one of the many small schools located near the family farm, or was taught by an instructor at home. Addison likely became aware of the new agricultural and mechanical school in Blacksburg through the many newspaper advertisements placed by the school's founding president, Charles L.C. Minor.

== College years ==
Caldwell attended V.A.M.C. from 1872 to 1876, taking an extra year to complete the three-year program in agriculture. His brother, Mic was enrolled in 1872-73, 76, and 1877. Their younger brother, Frank B., enrolled from 1874 - 1877. Neither Frank, nor Mic graduated.

At the age of 16, Caldwell and his older brother, Milton M. "Mic" (age 18) made arrangements to attend Virginia Agricultural and Mechanical College (V.A.M.C.) in 1872. The brothers hiked from Sinking Creek, Craig County to Blacksburg, Va., located 26 miles southwest of the Caldwell farm on the far side of Gap Mountain. The Caldwell brothers' familiarity with foot trails may have assisted them in shortening the hike considerably. Addison officially enrolled as the school's first student on October 1, 1872, at the Preston and Olin Building to officially mark the beginning of the Virginia Agricultural and Mechanical College. Mic enrolled several hours after Addison. Addison's 26 mile hike to enroll became legendary and is revered and celebrated by Virginia Tech. In present day, the hike is referred to as the "Caldwell March" and is commemorated annually by Virginia Tech's Corps of Cadets as a right of passage for its freshman members.

School president, Charles Minor and the faculty, including James Henry Lane, Charles Martin, Gray Carroll, and Shepherd were on hand to welcome the school's first students. Caldwell, had received a scholarship from his county's school superintendent, The scholarship covered tuition ($30), college fees ($10), and barracks fee ($5/month).

In a letter to General Joseph R. Anderson, a member of the school's Board of Visitors, President Minor wrote: "We have now thirty students matriculated, ... our beginning is to be smaller than had been expected." Minor also described the new students as "plain lads for the most part" and largely under-prepared, forcing the faculty to review high school, and even grammar school material. The total enrollment increased to 132 students by the end of the first school year.

All students at V.A.M.C. lived a military lifestyle as members of what is now known as the Corps of Cadets. In 1872, cadets were assigned to either A or B company and wore standard uniforms of gray pants, jackets and hats with black trim. General James Henry Lane, a former Confederate General, was the school's first Commandant of Cadets. Caldwell attained the rank of second sergeant of VAMC's Company B in his final year.

According to Caldwell's 1875 report card, he excelled in written composition, military tactics, and farm work. He was above average in natural history, French, chemistry, and composition/rhetoric and "tolerable" or worse in mathematics and bookkeeping. His other courses during his four years at VAMC most likely included: English grammar, geography with map drawing, descriptive astronomy, penmanship, free-hand drawing, lectures on physiology and hygiene, habits and manners, and lectures on agricultural and mechanical arts.

In 1872, Caldwell joined the Maury Literary society, which became two separate societies in 1873: the Lee Literary Society and the Maury Literary Society. Both groups focused on writing, public speaking and debate and together they founded the school's first publication, The Gray Jacket in 1875.

William Addison Caldwell graduated with V.A.M.C.'s second class on August 9, 1876. Gen. J. H. Williams of Winchester delivered the annual commencement address. The graduating class held an alumni meeting and elected Caldwell as secretary of the alumni association of the class of 1876 .

== Post-graduation ==
Caldwell became a school teacher in Craig County shortly after graduating. By 1887, he was an office clerk at Norfolk and Western Railway in Roanoke, Virginia, where he was described as a "well-known and popular employee".

In 1889, Caldwell was active in the real estate industry and worked as the secretary for a group of stockholders for the Lansdowne Improvement Co. of Roanoke. He attended the Virginia Real Estate Convention in Roanoke in 1891.

In 1898, Caldwell moved to Wilmington, North Carolina and worked as a salesman for several large wholesale firms on the wharf, including: the Roanoke Chemical Co., the Stove Company, Mr. W.B. Cooper, Messrs. Blair & Haly, and the C.C. Covington Company.

In Caldwell's absence, his parents, brother, Mic, and sisters, Grace and Nell sold the farm in Sinking Creek and moved to Radford, Virginia. He visited them in the summer months.

== Health issues and death ==
Sometime before 1910, Caldwell's health declined, and he had surgery for a brain tumor. He stayed at the family home in Radford to recover.

In the spring of 1910, Caldwell returned to Wilmington, NC. on his doctor's recommendation that salt air would be good for him. He resided at 115 Fourth St. in Wilmington and became a clerk at the Tangmoore Hotel in Wrightsville Beach.

On June 1, 1910. In a letter to his niece, Caldwell wrote that it was "a fine place" but he would prefer to be in Radford and couldn't tell if the salt air was helpful or not.

On June 19, Caldwell fainted and fell, suffering a head injury and was hospitalized. Caldwell lived at his Wilmington residence for just 13 days before being hospitalized.

Caldwell died on June 29, 1910, in a hospital in Wilmington and was buried in the Caldwell family cemetery in Radford, VA On July 1, 1910.

== Legacy ==
William Addison Caldwell is an icon for the university. His epic hike to enroll as the school's very first student is commemorated in many ways:

- The 'Caldwell March' - A memorial hike, named after Caldwell. Each year, freshman cadets re-enact the hike made by Caldwell in two parts: half the distance in the fall semester and the second half in spring. The Spring march concludes on campus in the Upper Quad, where the Corps band, the Highty-Tighties play and Skipper, the cadet's cannon is sounded.
- The Addison Caldwell Statue - A life-size statue of Caldwell, sculpted by Lawrence Bechtel, titled "Walking Toward the Light". The statue was unveiled on campus on October 20, 2006, and depicts Caldwell during his 26-mile hike from his home in Sinking Creek, VA. The statue was originally located near Rasche Hall on the Upper Quad of campus. Upon the completion of two new cadet dorms in 2017, the statue was relocated to a more prominent location along steps between the Upper Quad and Alumni Mall. A plaque, mounted with the statue reads: "Craig County farm boy Add Caldwell walked 26 miles to enroll here in 1872 as the first student.The popular cadet majored in agriculture and worked as a teacher, clerk, and salesman before his death in 1910. Donated by the Class of 1956 Sculpture by Lawrence Reid Bechtel"
- The Add Caldwell Lounge - A student lounge named after Addison Caldwell, located in the G. Burke Johnston Student Center on the campus of Virginia Tech.
- The Virginia Tech Library System - The library's e-catalog is known as 'Addison'.
- Caldwell's bible - Caldwell's personal bible was donated to Virginia Tech by his nephew, and namesake in 1989.
- National Forest campsite: "Caldwell Fields" - A campground in Jefferson National Forest with 3 sections named after the Caldwell brothers: Addison, Milton (Mic), and Frank. The Caldwell March starts and ends near the park.
- Virginia Historical marker- In 1997, a state historical marker honoring Add was placed near the Caldwell Farm, near the towns of New Castle and Simmonsville, in Craig County at routes 42 and 625 at coordinates: 37° 25.565′ N, 80° 15.176′ W. The marker reads: "KH3 - WILLIAM ADDISON "ADD" CALDWELL - VIRGINIA TECH'S FIRST STUDENT. Three miles north of here stands the childhood home of William Addison "Add" Caldwell. He walked about 28-miles to Blacksburg on 1 October 1872 and became the first student to register at Virginia Agricultural and Mechanical College, now Virginia Polytechnic Institute and State University. Graduating in 1876, Caldwell was elected secretary of his class alumni association. He worked as a teacher, clerk and salesman before his death on 29 June 1910. He is buried in Radford, Virginia."
