= New Market Historic District (New Market, Virginia) =

Historic district in Virginia, United States

- U.S. National Register of Historic Places
- U.S. Historic district
- Virginia Landmarks Register
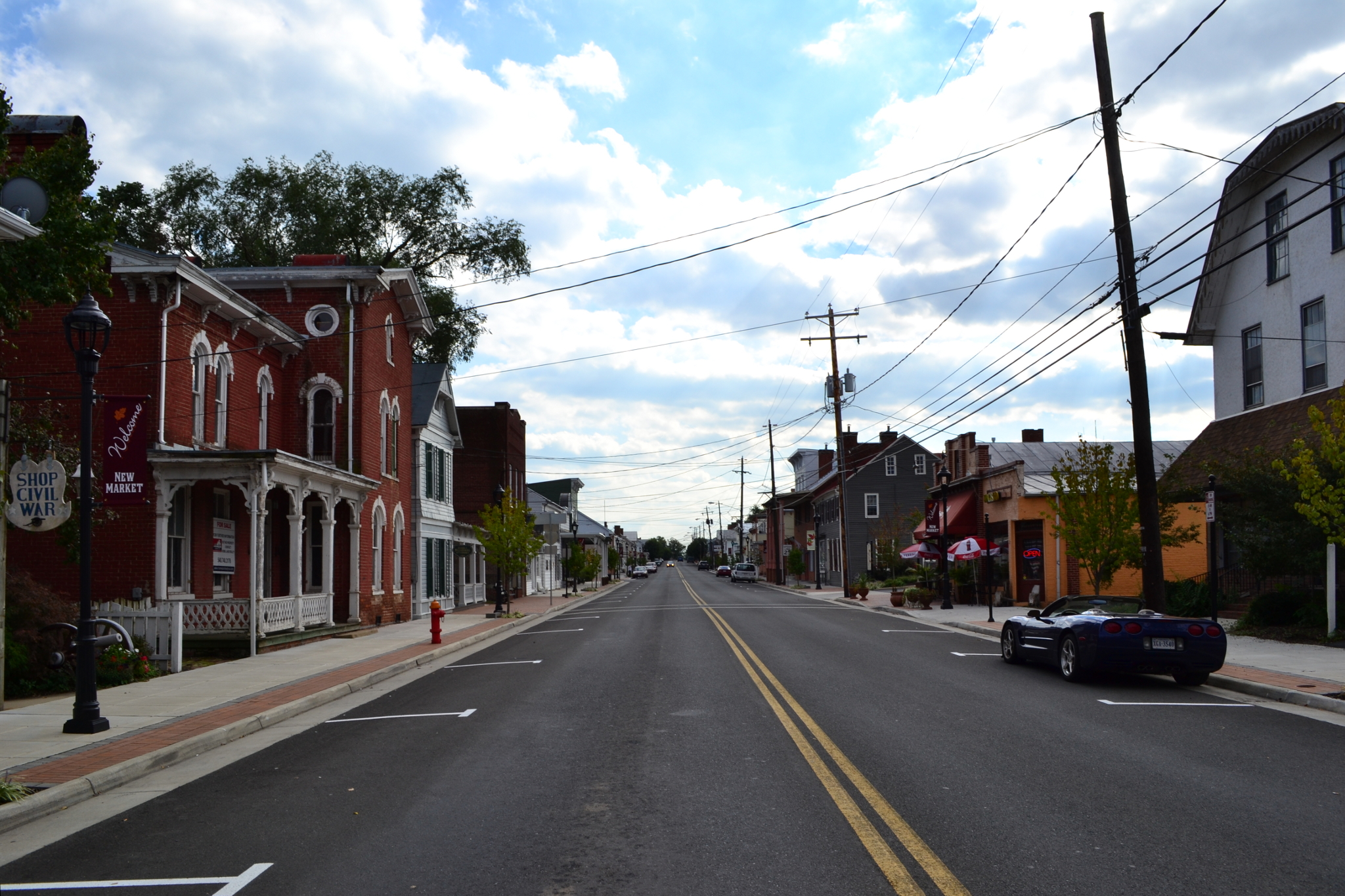
- New Market Historic District, September 2013

- Location within Virginia Location within the United States
- Location: Jct. of U.S. 11 and 211, New Market, Virginia
- Coordinates: 38°38′49″N 78°40′20″W
- Area: 130 acres (53 ha)
- Built: 1785
- Architectural style: Late Victorian, Georgian, Federal
- NRHP reference No.: 72001416
- VLR No.: 269-0005

Significant dates
- Added to NRHP: September 22, 1972
- Designated VLR: May 16, 1972

New Market Historic District is a national historic district located at New Market, Shenandoah County, Virginia. The district encompasses 11 contributing buildings in the crossroads town of New Market. It includes a variety of commercial, residential, and institutional buildings dating primarily from 19th century. They are in a variety of popular architectural styles including Victorian, Federal, and Georgian. Notable buildings include the Henkel house (c. 1800), Lee-Jackson Hotel (c. 1810), Solon Henkel House (c. 1800), Salyard House, Rupp House, and Emmanuel Lutheran Church.

It was listed on the National Register of Historic Places in 1972.
