= Hamburg, Virginia =

Hamburg, Virginia may refer to:

- Hamburg, Page County, Virginia
- Hamburg, Shenandoah County, Virginia
