= Virginia State Route 269 =

State highway in Alleghany County, Virginia, US

State Route 269
- Longdale Furnace Road

Route information
- Maintained by VDOT
- Length: 6.80 mi (10.94 km)
- Existed: 1983–present

Major junctions
- West end: I-64 / US 60 / SR 42 near Nicelytown
- East end: I-64 / US 60 / SR 850 at Longdale Furnace

Location
- Country: United States
- State: Virginia
- Counties: Alleghany

Highway system
- Virginia Routes; Interstate; US; Primary; Secondary; Byways; History; HOT lanes
← SR 267	→ SR 270

State Route 269 (SR 269) is a primary state highway in the U.S. state of Virginia. Known as Longdale Furnace Road, the state highway runs 6.80 miles (10.94 km) from Interstate 64 (I-64)/U.S. Route 60 (US 60), and SR 42 near Nicelytown east to I-64/US 60 at Longdale Furnace. SR 269 forms part of the old alignment of US 60 in eastern Alleghany County.

== Route description ==
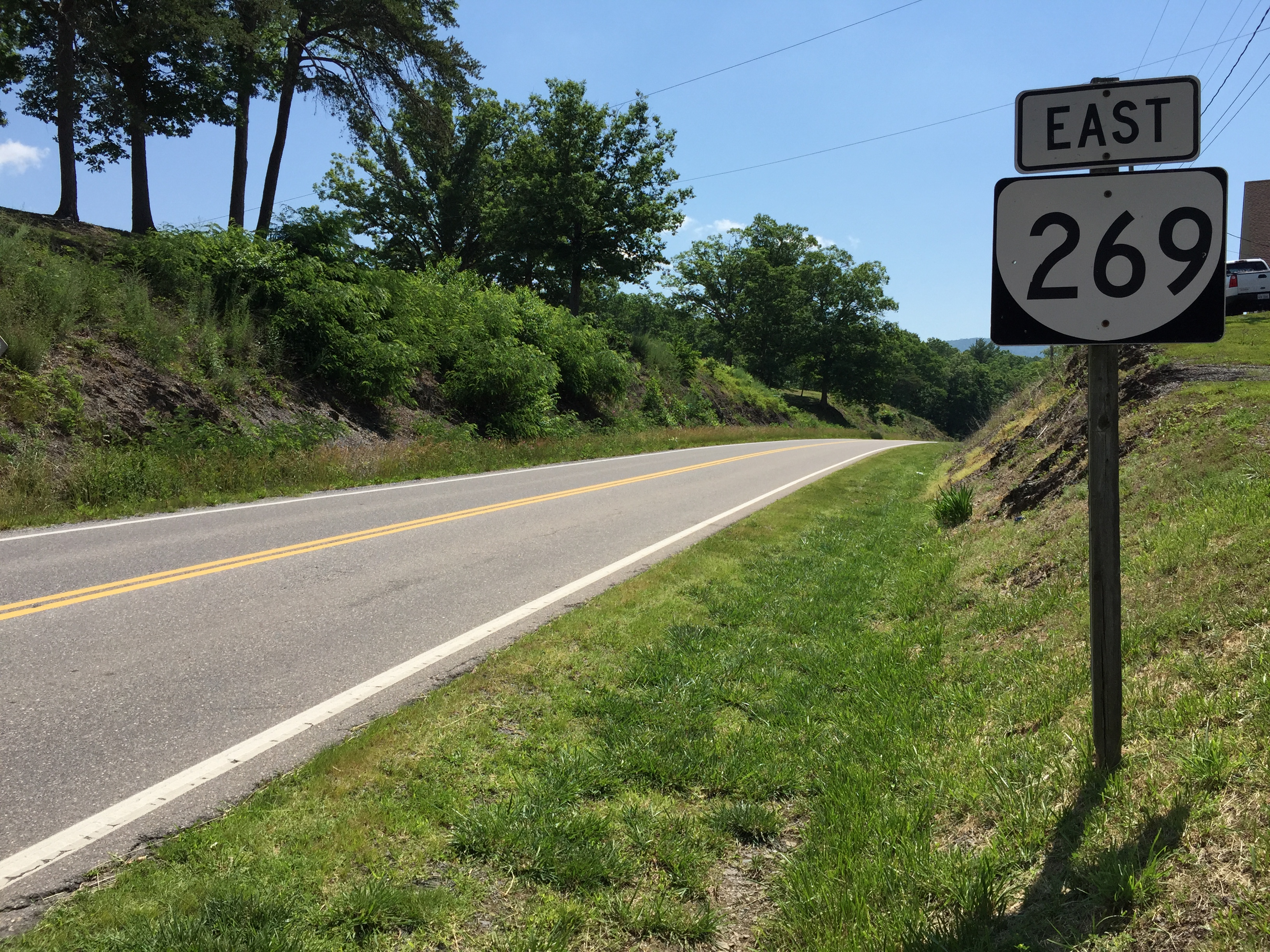
View east at the west end of SR 269 at I-64/US 60 and SR 42 near Nicelytown

SR 269 begins at a diamond interchange with I-64/US 60. The roadway continues north as SR 42 (Forty Two Road) through Nicelytown. SR 42 runs concurrently with SR 269 south to the former highway's southern terminus at SR 632 (Longdale Furnace Road), where SR 269 turns East on a two-lane undivided road. The state highway parallels I-64/US 60 southeast through the narrow valley of Sharvers Run to the Cowpasture River, then crosses the river and veers northeast to follow Simpson Creek. SR 269 follows the creek to the hamlet of Longdale Furnace to its eastern terminus at a diamond interchange with I-64/US 60. The roadway continues northeast beyond the interchange as SR 850 (North Mountain Road).

== Major intersections ==
The entire route is in Alleghany County.

Location	mi	km	Destinations	Notes
	0.00	0.00	I-64 / US 60 / SR 42 north (Forty Two Road) – Millboro Springs, Covington, Lexington	Exit 29 (I-64); western terminus; west end of concurrency with SR 42
	0.18	0.29	SR 632 west (Longdale Furnace Road)	east end of SR 42 overlap; former US 60 west
Longdale Furnace			SR 770 (Collierstown Road)	former SR 251 east
Longdale Furnace	6.80	10.94	I-64 / US 60 / SR 850 (North Mountain Road) – Covington, Lexington	Exit 35 (I-64); eastern terminus; former US 60 east
1.000 mi = 1.609 km; 1.000 km = 0.621 mi: Concurrency terminus
