= Newmarket, Virginia =

Newmarket, Virginia may refer to:

- New Market, Virginia
- Newmarket, Newport News, Virginia, a neighborhood of Newport News
