= Hotchkiss =

Hotchkiss may refer to:

== Places ==
=== Canada ===
- Hotchkiss, Alberta
- Hotchkiss, Calgary

=== United States ===
- Hotchkiss, Colorado
- Hotchkiss, Virginia
- Hotchkiss, West Virginia

== Business and industry ==
- Automobiles Hotchkiss, a French automobile manufacturer
- Hotchkiss et Cie, a French armaments manufacturer
- Hotchkiss Ordnance Company, an English armaments manufacturer

== Military ==
- Hotchkiss H35, a French tank of World War II
- Hotchkiss gun
  - Hotchkiss machine gun, including a list of variants
- Hotchkiss M201, a French light transport vehicle

== Other uses ==
- Hotchkiss (surname)
- Hotchkiss drive, a form of automobile power transmission and suspension.
- Hotchkiss Bicycle Railroad in Smithville, Burlington County, New Jersey, U.S.
- Hotchkiss School, a private school in Lakeville, Connecticut, U.S.
- Rebecca Hotchkiss, a character on the NBC/DirecTV daytime drama Passions

== See also ==
- Hodgkin, a surname
