= Hotchkiss (surname) =

Hotchkiss is a surname. Notable people with the surname include:

- Avis Hotchkiss, early American motorcycle traveler with her daughter Effie
- Benjamin B. Hotchkiss (1826–1885), 19th-century American engineer, inventor of the eponymous gun
- E. H. Hotchkiss (1858–1917), an inventor of the stapler
- Effie Hotchkiss, pioneering American motorcyclist with her mother Avis
- George Hotchkiss (1906–1989), American professional basketball coach
- George W. Hotchkiss (1831–1926), American businessman
- Giles W. Hotchkiss (1815–1878), American politician
- Harley Hotchkiss (1927–2011), Canadian businessman
- Herman Hotchkiss (1765–1836), American settler
- Jedediah Hotchkiss (1828–1899), cartographer for the Confederate Army during the American Civil War
- Julius Hotchkiss (1810–1878), American politician
- L. D. Hotchkiss (1893–1964), American journalist
- Maria Bissell Hotchkiss (1827–1901), wife of Benjamin B. Hotchkiss and founder of The Hotchkiss School and Hotchkiss Library
- Merritt Hotchkiss, Canadian politician
- Ralf Hotchkiss, American inventor
- Rollin Hotchkiss (1911–2004), American biochemist
- Sylvester Hotchkiss, American architect
- William Horace Hotchkiss (1864–?), American writer
- William O. Hotchkiss (1878–1954), American geologist
- William Hotchkiss III (born 1943), former commanding general of the Philippine Air Force
- W.R. Hotchkiss, founder of what would become the Deluxe Corporation

== See also ==
- Hotchkis
