= Hotchkis =

Hotchkis is a surname. Notable people with the surname include:

- Anna Hotchkis (1885–1984), Scottish artist and writer
- Daniel Hotchkis (born 1985), Australian field hockey player
- Mark Hotchkis (born 1969), American racing driver
- Joan Hotchkis (1927–2022), American actress

== See also ==
- Hotchkiss (disambiguation)
