= Mechanicsburg, Virginia =

- Census-designated place
- Location within Virginia Location within the United States
- Coordinates: 37.1488°N 80.9406°W
- Country: United States
- State: Virginia
- County: Bland

Area
  - Total: 0.48 sq mi (1.24 km^{2})
  - Land: 0.47 sq mi (1.23 km^{2})
  - Water: 0 sq mi (0.0 km^{2})

Population (2020)
  - Total: 81
- Time zone: UTC-5 (Eastern (EST))
  - Summer (DST): UTC-4 (EDT)
- ZIP Code: 24315 (Bland)
- Area code: 276
- FIPS code: 51-50840
- GNIS feature ID: 2807407

Mechanicsburg is an unincorporated community and census-designated place (CDP) in Bland County, Virginia, United States. As of the 2020 census, it had a population of 81.

The CDP is in eastern Bland County, along Virginia State Route 42, which leads west-southwest 10 miles (16 km) to Bland, the county seat, and northeast 23 miles (37 km) to Pearisburg.

== Demographics ==
Mechanicsburg first appeared as a census designated place in the 2020 U.S. census.
