= Van Buren sisters =

Pioneering female motorcyclists (1884–1959)

Augusta Van Buren
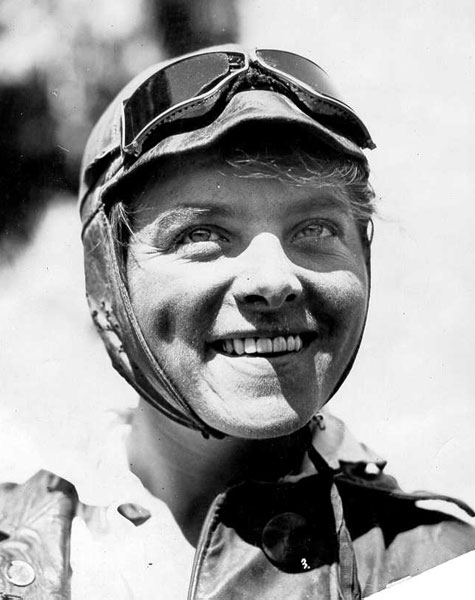
- Born: 26 March 1884; New York, United States
- Died: 30 September 1959 (aged 75); Middletown, New Castle County, Delaware, United States
- Other name: Augusta Roberts
- Occupations: Librarian, pilot
- Known for: Motorcycling across the US

Adeline Van Buren
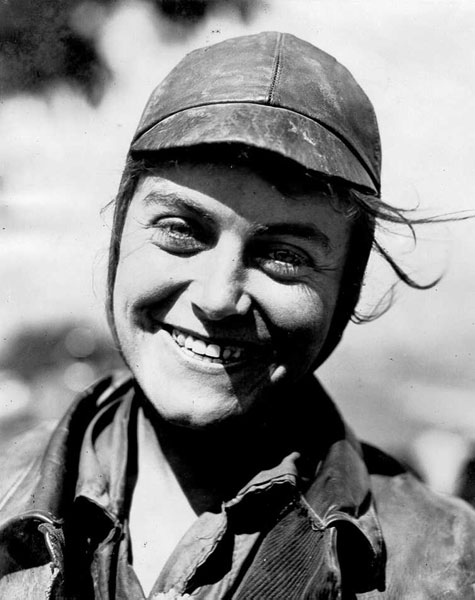
- Born: 26 July 1889; New York, United States
- Died: 1949 (aged 59–60)
- Other name: Adeline Tully
- Occupations: Lawyer, educator
- Known for: Motorcycling across the USA

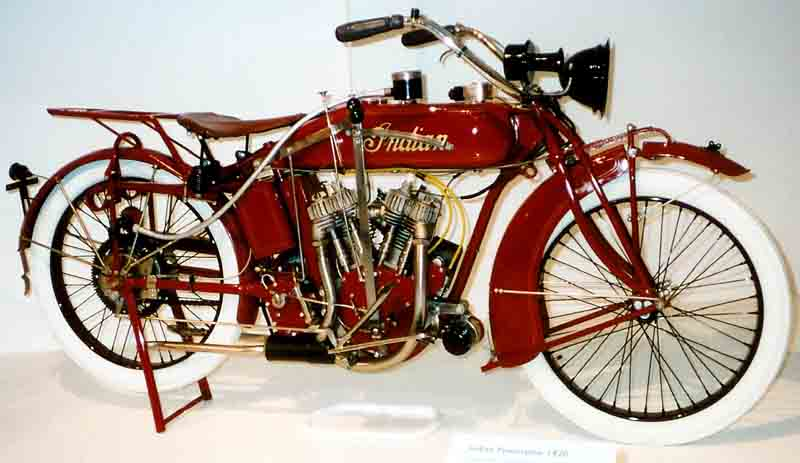

Augusta Van Buren and Adeline Van Buren, sisters, rode 5,500 miles in 60 days to cross the continental United States, each on their own motorcycle, completing on 8 September 1916. In so doing, they became the first women to ever ride solo motorcycles across the entire US continent, and the second and third women to drive motorcycles across the continent, following Effie Hotchkiss, who had completed a Brooklyn-to-San Francisco route the year before with her mother, Avis, who took part as a sidecar passenger.

== History of the ride ==
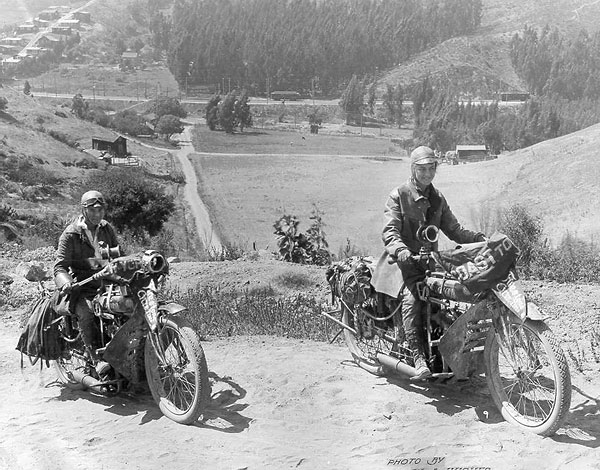

The sisters descended from Martin Van Buren, the eighth President of the United States. In 1916, 32-year-old Augusta and 27-year-old Adeline Van Buren, or Gussie and Addie as they were known, were young and active in the national Preparedness Movement. America was about to enter World War I, and the sisters wanted to prove that women could ride as well as men and would be able to serve as military dispatch riders, freeing up men for other tasks. They also hoped to remove one of the primary arguments for denying women the right to vote. For their ride, they dressed in military-style leggings and leather riding breeches, a taboo at that time.

They set out from Sheepshead Bay Race Track in Brooklyn, New York on July 4, riding 1,000 cc Indian Power Plus motorcycles equipped with gas headlights. Indians were the high-end motorcycle at the time, selling for $275, and ran Firestone "non-skid" tires.

They arrived in Los Angeles on September 8 after having to contend with poor roads, heavy rains and mud, natural barriers like the Rocky Mountains, and social barriers such as the local police who took offense at their choice of men's clothing. During the ride, they were arrested numerous times, not for speeding but for wearing men's clothes. In Colorado, they became the first women to reach the 14,109-foot (4,300 m) summit of Pikes Peak by any motor vehicle. Later on, they became lost in the desert 100 miles (160 km) west of Salt Lake City and were saved by a prospector after their water ran out. They completed their ride by traveling across the border to Tijuana in Mexico.

Beyond question the Van Burens have made one of the most noteworthy trips ever accomplished, chiefly because they have proven that the motorcycle is a universal vehicle.

— Paul Derkum, Indian Motorcycle Company

Despite succeeding in their historical trek, the sisters' applications to be military dispatch riders were continually rejected. Reports in the leading motorcycling magazine of the day praised the bike but not the sisters and described the journey as a "vacation". One newspaper published a degrading article accusing the sisters of using the national preparedness issue as an excellent excuse to escape their roles as housewives and "display their feminine counters in nifty khaki and leather uniforms". However, the sisters' trip had gained national attention and would end up being crucial in the support for the women's suffrage movement. The 19th Amendment, granting American women the right to vote, was ratified four years later.

== Later life ==
Adeline continued her career as an educator, and earned her law degree from New York University. Augusta became a pilot and joined Amelia Earhart's Ninety-Nines international women's flying organization.

== Memorial ==
In 1988, the sisters' achievement was celebrated by four women members of the American Motorcyclist Association (AMA) with the "Van Buren Transcon", a fund-raising effort for the Juvenile Diabetes Research Foundation supported by Honda, Kawasaki, Suzuki and Yamaha and designed to improve the public perception of motorcycling.

In 2002, the sisters were inducted into the AMA's Motorcycle Hall of Fame and into the Sturgis Motorcycle Museum & Hall of Fame during 2003.

In 2006 Bob Van Buren, great-nephew of the sisters, and his wife, Rhonda Van Buren, retraced the route taken by Gussie and Addie on a Harley-Davidson Low Rider from New York City to San Francisco. In line with the sisters' desire to influence the military, the trip was a fundraiser for the Intrepid Fallen Heroes Fund and was launched from the Intrepid Sea, Air & Space Museum in Manhattan. Contributions to the fund helped to build a new rehabilitation hospital at Brooke Army Medical Center (BAMC) in San Antonio, Texas.
