= Moscow, Virginia =

Unincorporated community in Virginia, United States

Coordinates: 38°19′1″N 79°5′20″W

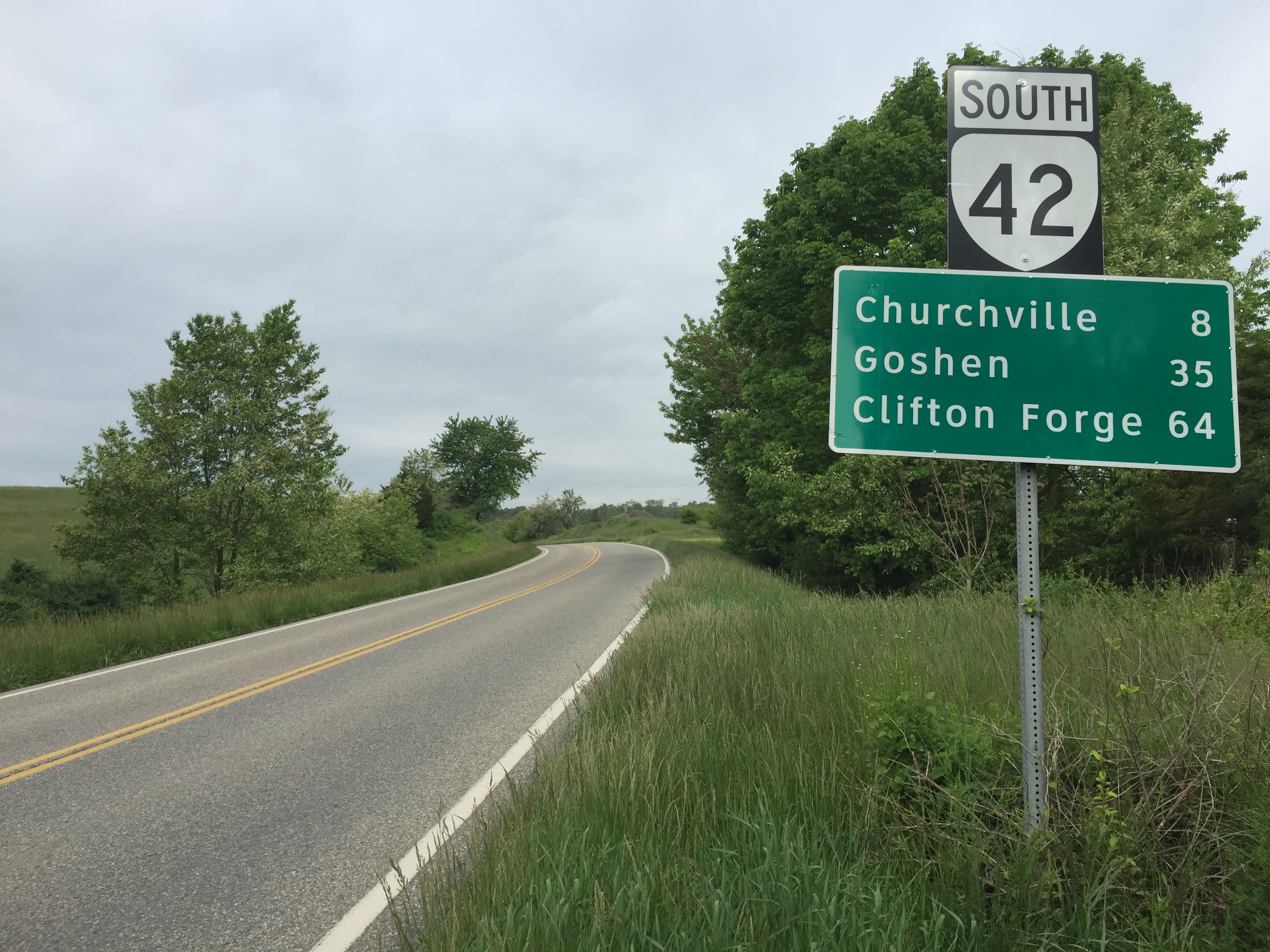
2016-05-19 09 28 53 View south along Scenic Highway Road (Virginia State Route 42) near Mount Solon Road (Virginia State Secondary Route 607) in Moscow, Augusta County, Virginia

Moscow is an unincorporated community in Augusta County, Virginia, United States, located on State Route 42 approximately 8 miles (13 km) south of Bridgewater. With only a few residents, it consists of a Brethren church, an elementary school, a cabinet shop, a few houses, and a small store. This is mostly a business area for the Mount Solon area.

North River High School was listed on the National Register of Historic Places in 1985. The name was also taken from the Russian city.
