= Carmel, Virginia =

- Unincorporated community
- Location within the Commonwealth of Virginia Carmel (the United States)
- Coordinates: 38°49′37″N 78°25′58″W
- Country: United States
- State: Virginia
- County: Shenandoah
- Time zone: UTC−5 (Eastern (EST))
  - Summer (DST): UTC−4 (EDT)
- GNIS feature ID: 1499216

Carmel is an unincorporated community in Shenandoah County, Virginia, United States. Carmel lies within Fort Valley at the crossroads of Virginia Secondary Route 678 (Fort Valley Road) and Oak Tree Road.
