= The Stone and Holt Weeks Foundation =

U.S. nonprofit organization

The Stone and Holt Weeks Foundation is a non-profit organization founded in 2009 by journalist Linton Weeks and his wife, artist Jan Taylor Weeks, in remembrance of their two sons, Stone and Holt Weeks. The Foundation carries on the beliefs and spirits of Stone and Holt in doing good while having fun. It sponsors events that raise money and awareness for various charities and organizations that Stone and Holt were involved in.

== History ==
On July 23, 2009, brothers Stone Weeks, 24, and Holt Weeks, 20, both students at Rice University, were killed on Interstate 81 in Shenandoah County, Virginia, when a tractor-trailer truck struck their car, resulting in a multi-vehicle collision. The brothers were traveling to their parents' home in Rockville, Maryland, from Houston, Texas.

== Fundraising ==
The Stone and Holt Weeks Foundation has raised money and awareness for many organizations, including the Leukemia & Lymphoma Society, Rebuilding Together of Washington D.C. and The Beacon Homeless Shelter of Houston, Texas.

Awards and Memorials have also been established at Stone's and Holt's schools including the University of Delaware and Eckerd College.
