= North River High School =

Historic school building in Virginia, US

- U.S. National Register of Historic Places
- Virginia Landmarks Register
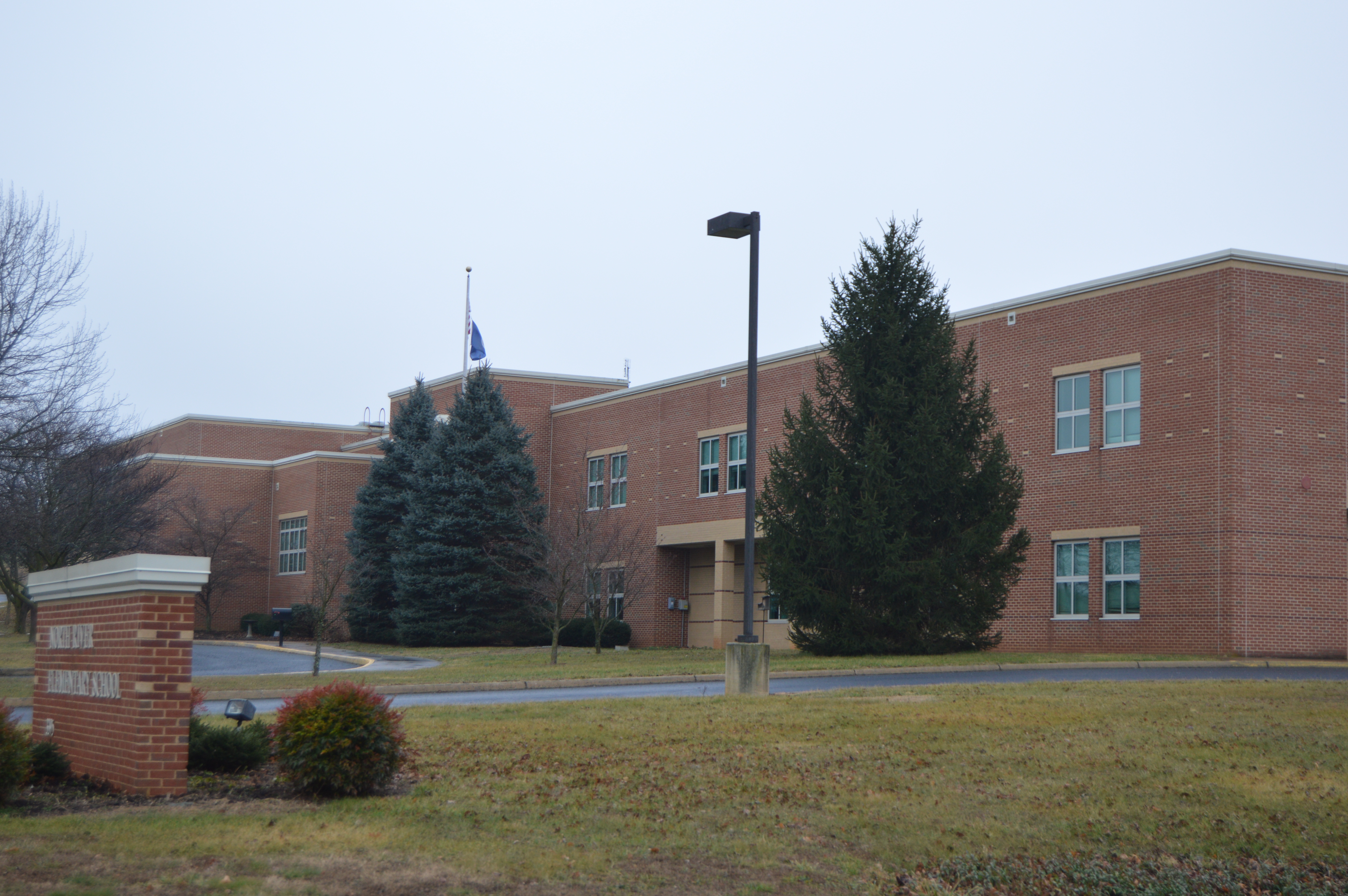
- Site, now occupied by North River Elementary School

- Location within Virginia Location within the United States
- Location: VA 42, Moscow, Virginia
- Coordinates: 38°18′54″N 79°4′45″W
- Area: 3.3 acres (1.3 ha)
- Built: 1930
- Built by: Kellis Bibb, G.G. Shaver
- Architectural style: Neocolonial
- MPS: Public Schools in Augusta County Virginia 1870--1940 TR
- NRHP reference No.: 85000394
- VLR No.: 007-1153

Significant dates
- Added to NRHP: February 27, 1985
- Designated VLR: December 11, 1984

North River High School was a historic public school building located at Moscow, Augusta County, Virginia. Built in 1930, it was a brick building consisting of an auditorium/gymnasium as the core of the building with rectangular gabled blocks on either side containing two rooms with the projecting gable ends. It had a steeply pitched gable roof and entrance portico reflecting the Colonial Revival style. Additions were made to the building in 1942 and 1950. Also on the property was a contributing brick agriculture building.

It was listed on the National Register of Historic Places in 1985.
