= New Market Battlefield State Historical Park =

- New Market Battlefield Park
- U.S. National Register of Historic Places
- U.S. Historic district
- Virginia Landmarks Register
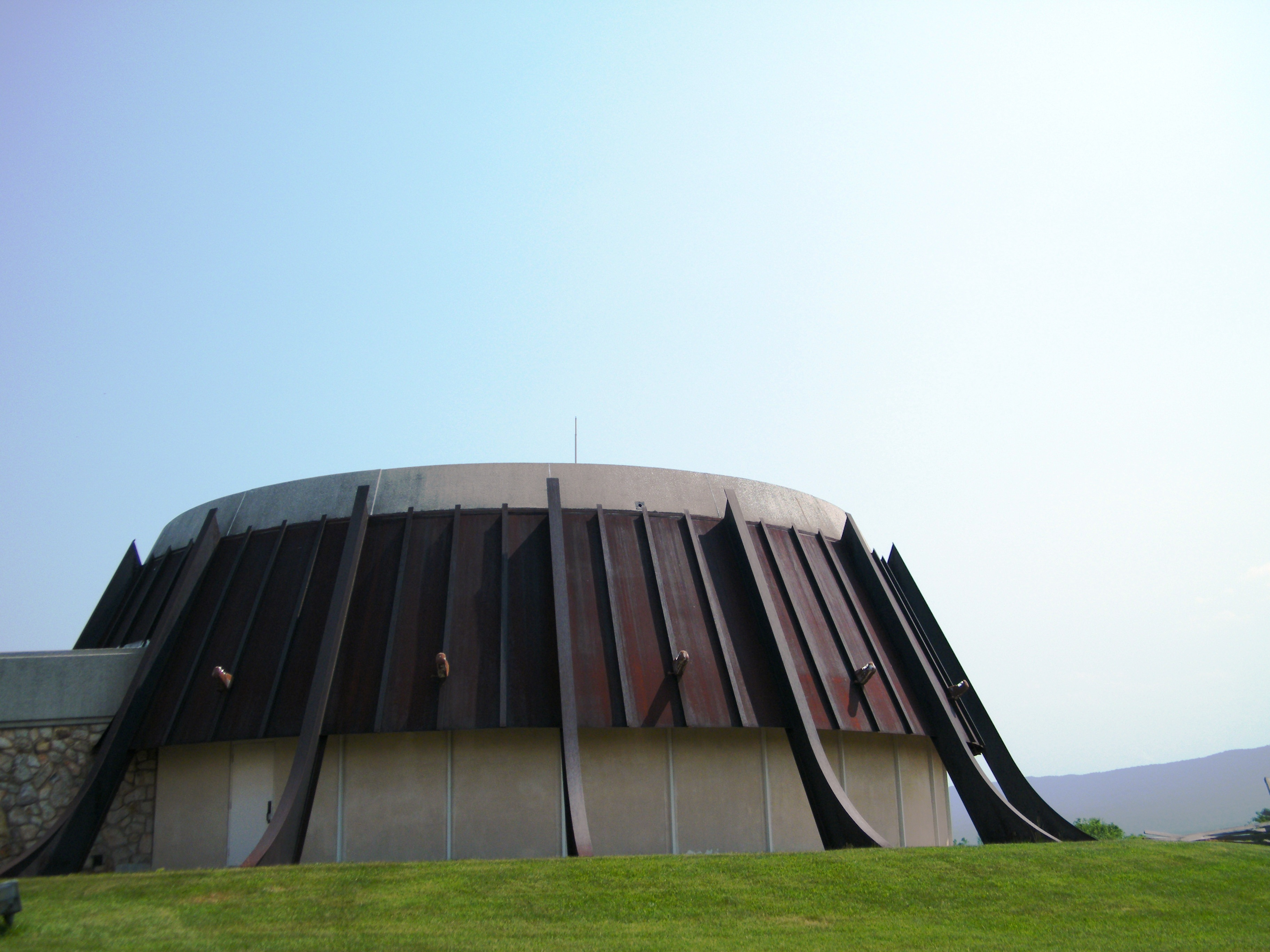
- Virginia Museum of the Civil War, June 2011

- Location within Virginia Location within the United States
- Location: North of junction of US 11 and US 211 (8895 George Collins Parkway), near New Market, Virginia
- Coordinates: 38°39′58″N 78°40′06″W
- Area: 160 acres (65 ha)
- Built: 1864
- NRHP reference No.: 70000824
- VLR No.: 085-0027

Significant dates
- Added to NRHP: September 15, 1970
- Designated VLR: June 2, 1970

Virginia Museum of the Civil War

New Market Battlefield State Historical Park is a historic American Civil War battlefield and national historic district located near New Market, Shenandoah County, Virginia. The district encompasses the site of the Battle of New Market, a battle fought on May 15, 1864, during Valley Campaigns of 1864. In the middle of the battlefield stands the Bushong House, used by both sides as a hospital during the battle and now the visitor center for the 300-acre park.

The park is the site of the Virginia Museum of the Civil War operated by the Virginia Military Institute.

It was listed on the National Register of Historic Places in 1970.
