= Broadford, Virginia =

- Unincorporated community
- Location within Virginia Location within the United States
- Coordinates: 36°55′38″N 81°40′21″W
- Country: United States
- State: Virginia
- County: Smyth
- Elevation: 1,795 ft (547 m)
- Time zone: UTC-5 (Eastern (EST))
  - Summer (DST): UTC-4 (EDT)
- ZIP code: 24316
- Area code: 276
- GNIS feature ID: 1492635

Broadford is an unincorporated community in Smyth County, Virginia, United States. Broadford is located along Laurel Creek at the junction of Virginia State Route 42 and Virginia State Route 91, 10.8 miles (17.4 km) northwest of Marion. Broadford has a post office with ZIP code 24316.
