= Simmonsville, Virginia =

- Unincorporated community
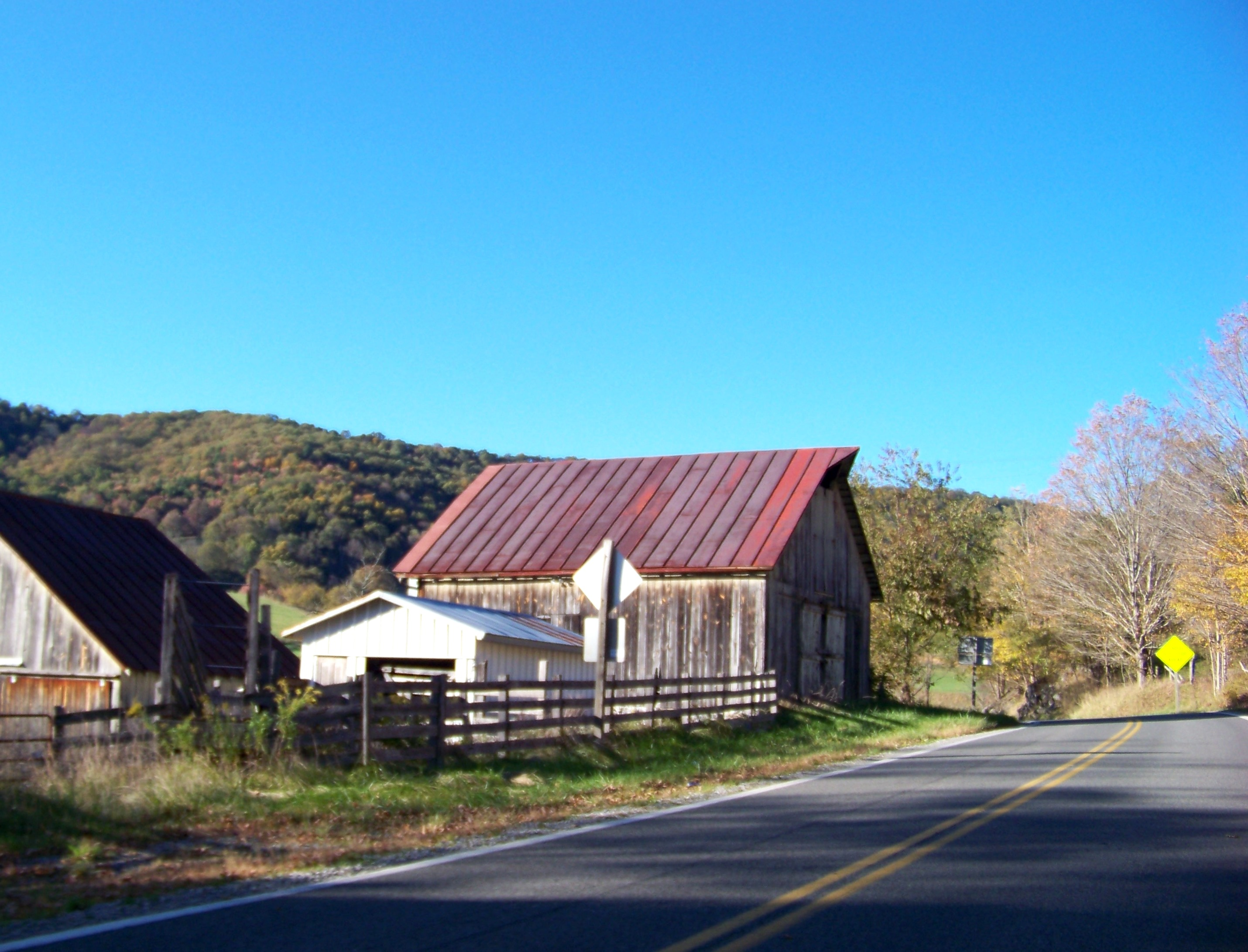

- Location in Virginia
- Coordinates: 37°23′3″N 80°21′42″W
- Country: United States
- State: Virginia
- County: Craig
- Elevation: 2,267 ft (691 m)
- Time zone: UTC−5 (Eastern (EST))
  - Summer (DST): UTC−4 (EDT)
- Area code: 540

Simmonsville is an unincorporated community in southwestern Craig County, Virginia, United States. It lies along State Route 42, 18 miles (29 km) southwest of New Castle.
