= Hudson Crossroads, Virginia =

- CDP
- Interactive map of Hudson Crossroads, Virginia
- Coordinates: 38°47′46″N 78°43′30″W
- Country: United States
- State: Virginia
- County: Shenandoah

Population (2020)
  - Total: Na
- Time zone: UTC−5 (Eastern (EST))
  - Summer (DST): UTC−4 (EDT)
- FIPS code: 51-04928

Hudson Crossroads is a census-designated place in Shenandoah County, in the U.S. state of Virginia.
