= Dayton Historic District (Dayton, Virginia) =

Historic district in Virginia, United States

- U.S. National Register of Historic Places
- U.S. Historic district
- Virginia Landmarks Register
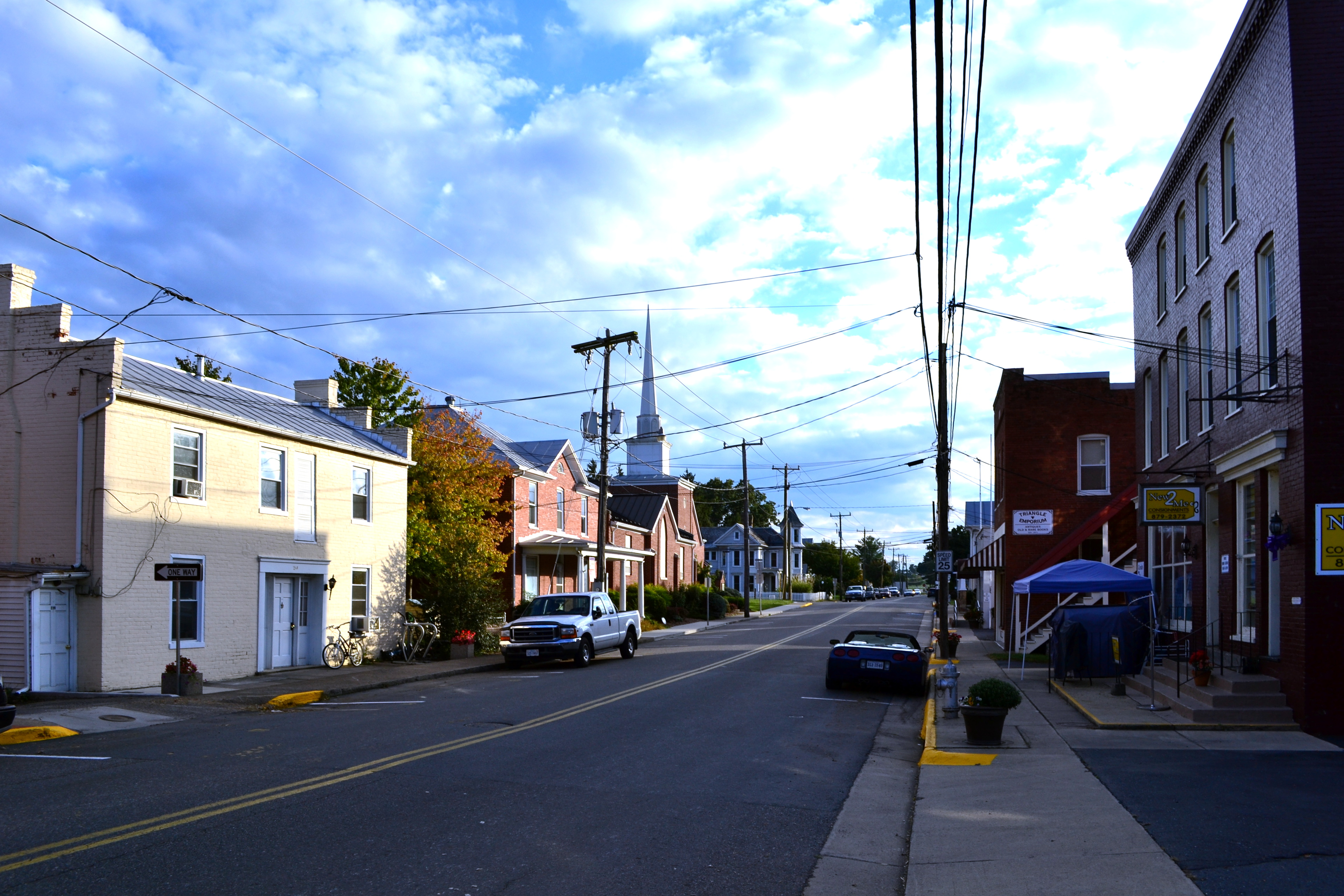
- Main Street, Dayton, Virginia, September 2013

- Location within Virginia Location within the United States
- Location: Roughly bounded by Main, Mason, Walnut, Summit, and Bowman Sts., Dayton, Virginia
- Coordinates: 38°24′58″N 78°56′27″W
- Area: 86 acres (35 ha)
- Built: 1880
- Architectural style: Late 19th and 20th century revivals, late Victorian
- NRHP reference No.: 84003590
- VLR No.: 206-0002

Significant dates
- Added to NRHP: August 16, 1984
- Designated VLR: June 19, 1984

Dayton Historic District is a national historic district located at Dayton, Virginia, United States. The district encompasses 154 contributing buildings and one contributing site in the central business district and surrounding residential areas of the town of Dayton. It includes a variety of residential, commercial, and institutional buildings, most of which date from the late 19th century and early 20th century. Notable buildings include the Alberta Coffman House, Layman House, the Samuel Shrum House, the Thomas House, W. J. Franklin House, Bank of Dayton (1911), the Ruebush–Kieffer Printing Company, Dayton Drug Company, Howe Memorial Hall, the Administration Building (1910), the Kieffer Alumni Gymnasium (1930), Carpenter Store (1888), Specialty Harness Company, Ruebush–Kieffer Company, and the Methodist, Presbyterian, and United Brethren churches.

It was listed on the National Register of Historic Places in 1984.
