= Avis and Effie Hotchkiss =

Motorcycling pioneers

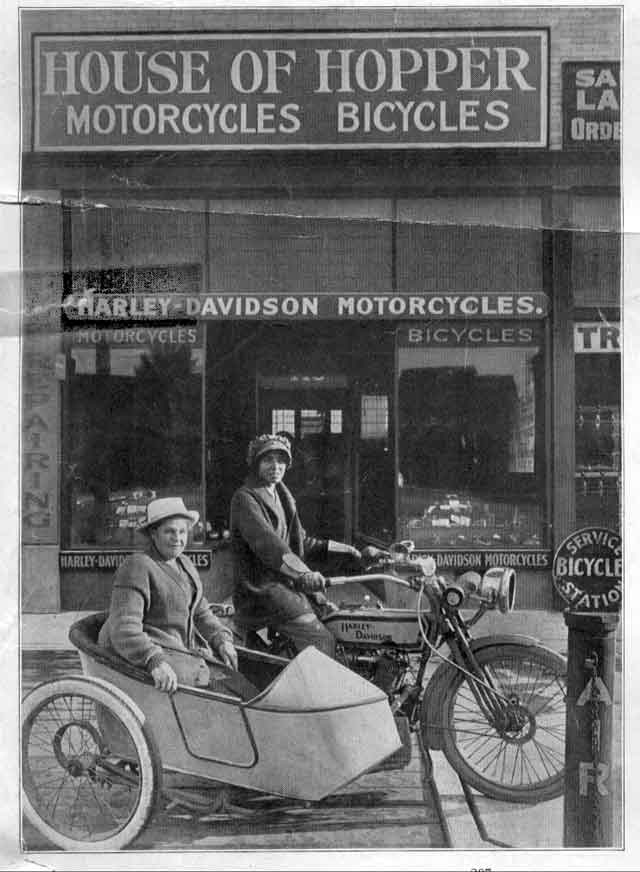
Avis and Effie Hotchkiss, Salt Lake City, 1915

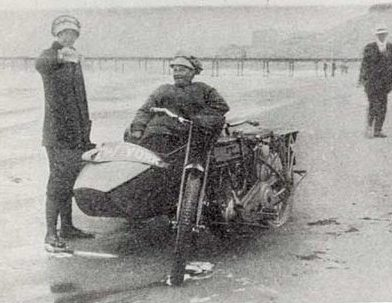
At Pacific Ocean, 1915

Avis and Effie Hotchkiss, mother and daughter from Brooklyn, New York, were pioneering motorcyclists who completed a 9,000-mile (14,000 km) round trip ride from New York to San Francisco and back on a Harley-Davidson motorcycle-sidecar combination in 1915.

== Transcontinental motorcycle ride ==
Effie Hotchkiss (January 28, 1889 – April 14, 1966) learned to ride a motorcycle at age 16, after instruction from her brother, and her first motorcycle was a Marsh & Metz. At the age of 18 Effie had begun working on Wall Street. In 1915, she acquired a new Harley-Davidson Model 11-F with a sidecar, the first Harley-Davidson to feature a 3-speed gearbox at a cost of $275, which she paid for from her inheritance from her father. She had an ambition to become the first woman to cross the United States on a motorcycle, and decided to visit the Panama Pacific International Exposition in San Francisco.

Age 26, on May 2, 1915, she set out with her mother Avis (age 56) in the sidecar, who noted, "I do not fear breakdowns for Effie, being a most careful driver, is a good mechanic and does her own repairing with her own tools."

They rode to Albany across the Hudson Valley, then travelled to Buffalo, and on to Chicago, averaging 150 miles a day. The two lady riders, as they were called, attracted lots of attention from curious onlookers wherever they stopped.

The pair took two months to reach San Francisco, attracting attention on the way. They stayed in rented rooms, travelling light with some clothes, tools and a gun. When they reached their final destination, they were photographed pouring out a jar of Atlantic sea water they had carried from New York, into the Pacific Ocean at Ocean Beach, in San Francisco.

The success of their journey made Effie and Avis Hotchkiss the first transcontinental female motorcyclists.

== Commemoration ==
In October 2022, the American Motorcyclist Association posthumously inducted Effie Hotchkiss into its Hall of Fame, with the family represented by Craig Dove, her great grandson.

== See also ==
- List of long-distance motorcycle riders
- Van Buren sisters
