= New Market Airport =

Airport in Virginia, United States

- IATA: none; ICAO: none; FAA LID: 8W2

Summary
- Airport type: Public
- Owner: Robert Thomas
- Serves: New Market, Virginia
- Elevation AMSL: 975 ft (297 m)
- Coordinates: 38°39′20″N 078°42′29″W
- Interactive map of New Market Airport

Runways
Direction	Length		Surface
Direction	ft	m	Surface
6/24	2,920	890	Asphalt

Statistics (2009)
- Aircraft operations: 15,413
- Based aircraft: 27
- Source: Federal Aviation Administration

New Market Airport (FAA LID: 8W2) is a privately owned public-use airport located two nautical miles (3.7 km) west of the central business district of New Market, a town in Shenandoah County, Virginia, United States. The facility serves primarily general aviation for the areas around New Market. The facility is also the base for a skydiving operation—Skydive Shenandoah—and arriving aircraft should be sure to check if skydiving operations are in progress on Unicom frequency 122.80. Skydiving Operations are intensive on weekends throughout the year.

== Facilities and aircraft ==
New Market Airport covers an area of 44 acres (18 ha) at an elevation of 975 feet (297 m) above mean sea level. It has one runway designated 6/24 with an asphalt surface measuring 2,920 by 60 feet (890 x 18 m).

For the 12-month period ending April 30, 2009, the airport had 15,413 aircraft operations, an average of 42 per day: 99.3% general aviation and 0.7% military. At that time there were 27 aircraft based at this airport: 93% single-engine and 7% multi-engine.

== See also ==
- Shenandoah Valley Academy
