= Hamburg, Shenandoah County, Virginia =

Hamburg, Virginia
- Unincorporated community
- Location within Virginia Location within the United States
- Coordinates: 38°48′18″N 78°38′15″W
- Country: United States
- State: Virginia
- County: Shenandoah
- Elevation: 1,010 ft (310 m)
- Time zone: UTC-5 (Eastern (EST))
  - Summer (DST): UTC-4 (EDT)
- GNIS feature ID: 1493052

Hamburg is an unincorporated community in Shenandoah County, Virginia, United States. Hamburg is located approximately 4.15 miles (6.68 km) southwest of Edinburg.
