= Conicville, Virginia =

- CDP
- Interactive map of Conicville, Virginia
- Coordinates: 38°49′48″N 78°41′24″W
- Country: United States
- State: Virginia
- County: Shenandoah
- Time zone: UTC−5 (Eastern (EST))
  - Summer (DST): UTC−4 (EDT)
- FIPS code: 51-04928

Conicville is a census-designated place in Shenandoah County, in the U.S. state of Virginia, at the intersection of State Route 42 - Senedo Road (also referred to Back Road in earlier times and Censuses) and County Road 703 - Conicville Road. Conicville was formerly known as Cabin Hill, as it was a cluster of approximately 22 homes, Christ Church and several, now closed, businesses, and is located at the northeast end of the Cabin Hill ridge that runs parallel to and just east of Swover Creek and State Route 42, from Hudson Crossroads, at SR 42 and CR 720 - Crooked Run Road. The US Geological Survey notes a Bench Mark elevation of 1256 feet, just south of the SR 42 / CR 703 intersection. Latitude 38.83 and longitude -78.69.

Conicville/Cabin Hill was founded by European, primarily Swiss (Mennonites) and Germanic immigrants, who emigrated through Pennsylvania, in the mid-1700s, to what was then Frederick County of Virginia. As population grew, Dunmore County was formed from part of Frederick County and was later renamed Shenandoah County.
