= Hotchkiss, Virginia =

Unincorporated community in Virginia, US

Coordinates: 38°00′05″N 79°34′51″W

Hotchkiss is an unincorporated community in Bath County, Virginia, United States.
