= Shenandoah County, Virginia =

County in Virginia, United States

- County
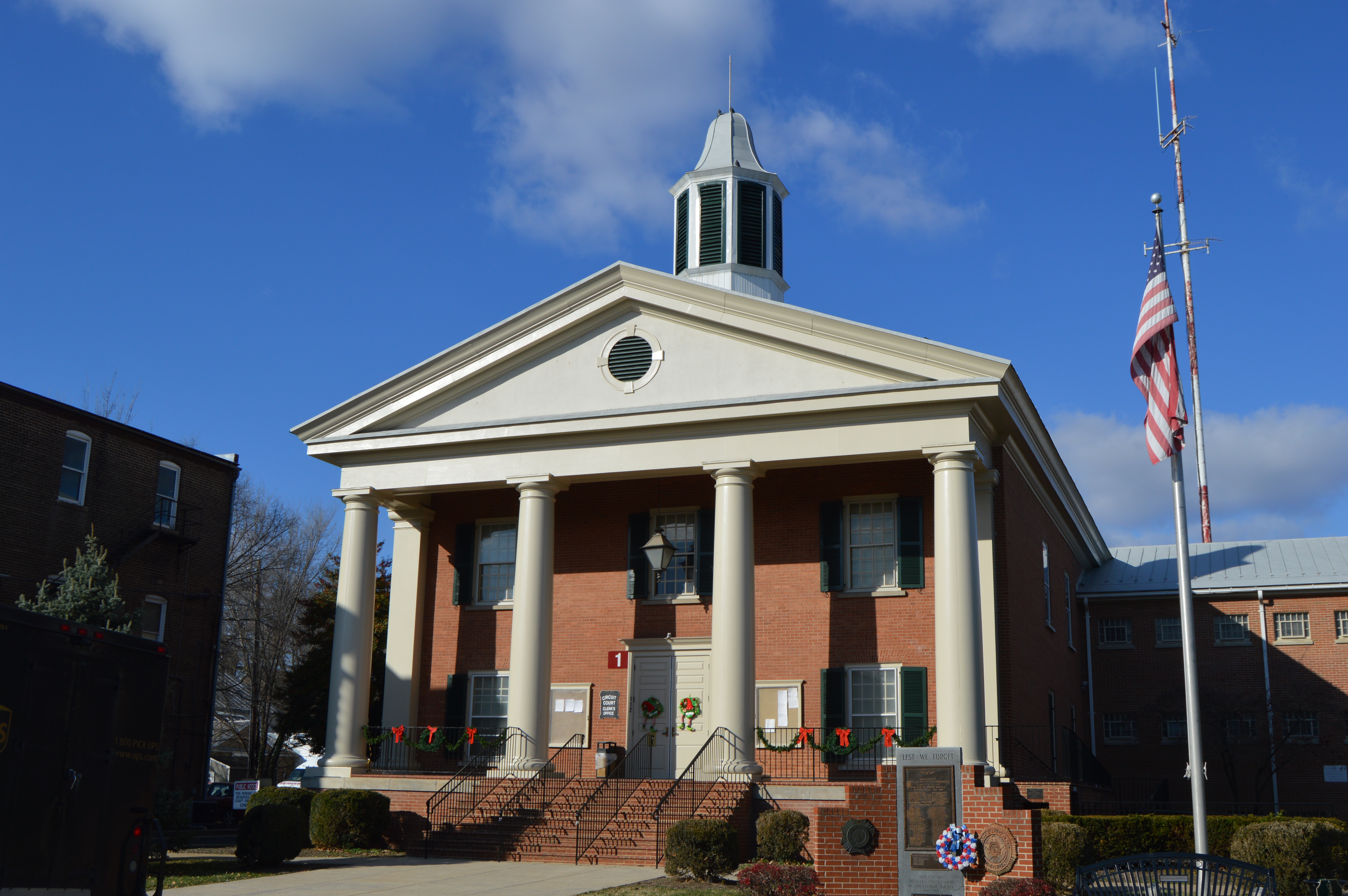
- Shenandoah County Courthouse in Woodstock

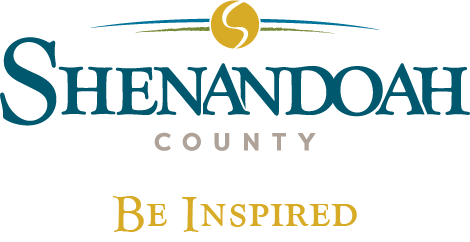
- Flag Logo

- Location within the U.S. state of Virginia
- Coordinates: 38°52′N 78°34′W
- Country: United States
- State: Virginia
- Founded: 1772
- Named for: Shenandoah River
- Seat: Woodstock
- Largest town: Strasburg

Government
  - County administrator: Evan Vass
  - Board: Members' List: • Mark Dotson; • Steve Baker; • David Ferguson; • Kyle Gutshall; • Dennis Morris (Vice Chair); • Timothy Taylor (Chair)

Area
  - Total: 512 sq mi (1,330 km^{2})
  - Land: 509 sq mi (1,320 km^{2})
  - Water: 3.4 sq mi (8.8 km^{2}) 0.7%

Population (2020)
  - Total: 44,186
  - Estimate (2025): 45,839 ▲
  - Density: 86.8/sq mi (33.5/km^{2})
- Time zone: UTC−5 (Eastern)
  - Summer (DST): UTC−4 (EDT)
- Congressional district: 6th
- Website: www.shenandoahcountyva.gov

Shenandoah County (formerly Dunmore County) is a county located in the Commonwealth of Virginia. As of the 2020 United States census, the population was 44,186. Its county seat is Woodstock. It is part of the Shenandoah Valley region of Virginia.

== History ==
For thousands of years, the Shenandoah Valley was used as a hunting ground by American Indians. By the early 18th century, the Six Nations of the Iroquois claimed the valley by right of conquest, although Shawnee and other tribes also used the region.

Colonial Governor Gooch formally purchased the Shenandoah Valley from the Six Nations under the Treaty of Lancaster in 1744. European settlement had already begun, and during Pontiac's War (1763–1766), Shawnee warriors carried out raids into the valley in an effort to halt colonial expansion.

George Washington represented Frederick County in the House of Burgesses from 1758 to 1765, when the area that became Woodstock was still part of the county. He sponsored legislation incorporating the town, which was established by charter in March 1761. The town originated as Muellerstadt, founded by Jacob Miller in 1752 on land granted by Lord Fairfax.

The county was established in 1772 as Dunmore County in honor of John Murray, 4th Earl of Dunmore, the last royal governor of Virginia, with Woodstock designated as the county seat. During the American Revolutionary War, Dunmore was forced from office, and the county was renamed Shenandoah County in 1778.

According to local tradition, Washington named the Shenandoah River, Shenandoah Valley, and the county in honor of the Christian Oneida chief Skenandoa, who helped secure Oneida and Tuscarora support for the American cause during the Revolutionary War, including assistance to the Continental Army at Valley Forge.

During the American Civil War, the Battle of New Market was fought in the county on May 15, 1864.

== Geography ==
Shenandoah and adjacent counties

According to the US Census Bureau, the county has a total area of 512 square miles (1,330 km^{2}), of which 509 square miles (1,320 km^{2}) is land and 3.4 square miles (8.8 km^{2}) (0.7%) is water. Fort Valley and the western slopes of the Massanutten Mountain are located within the county boundary.

=== Adjacent counties ===
- Hardy County, West Virginia – northwest
- Frederick County – northeast
- Warren County – east
- Page County – southeast
- Rockingham County – southwest

=== National protected areas ===
- Cedar Creek and Belle Grove National Historical Park (part)
- George Washington National Forest (part)

== Transportation ==
- Shenandoah Valley Commuter Bus Service offers weekday commuter bus service from the Northern Shenandoah Valley including Shenandoah County and Warren County to Northern Virginia and Washington, D.C., including Arlington County and Fairfax County. Origination points in Shenandoah County include Woodstock. Origination points in Warren County include Front Royal and Linden.

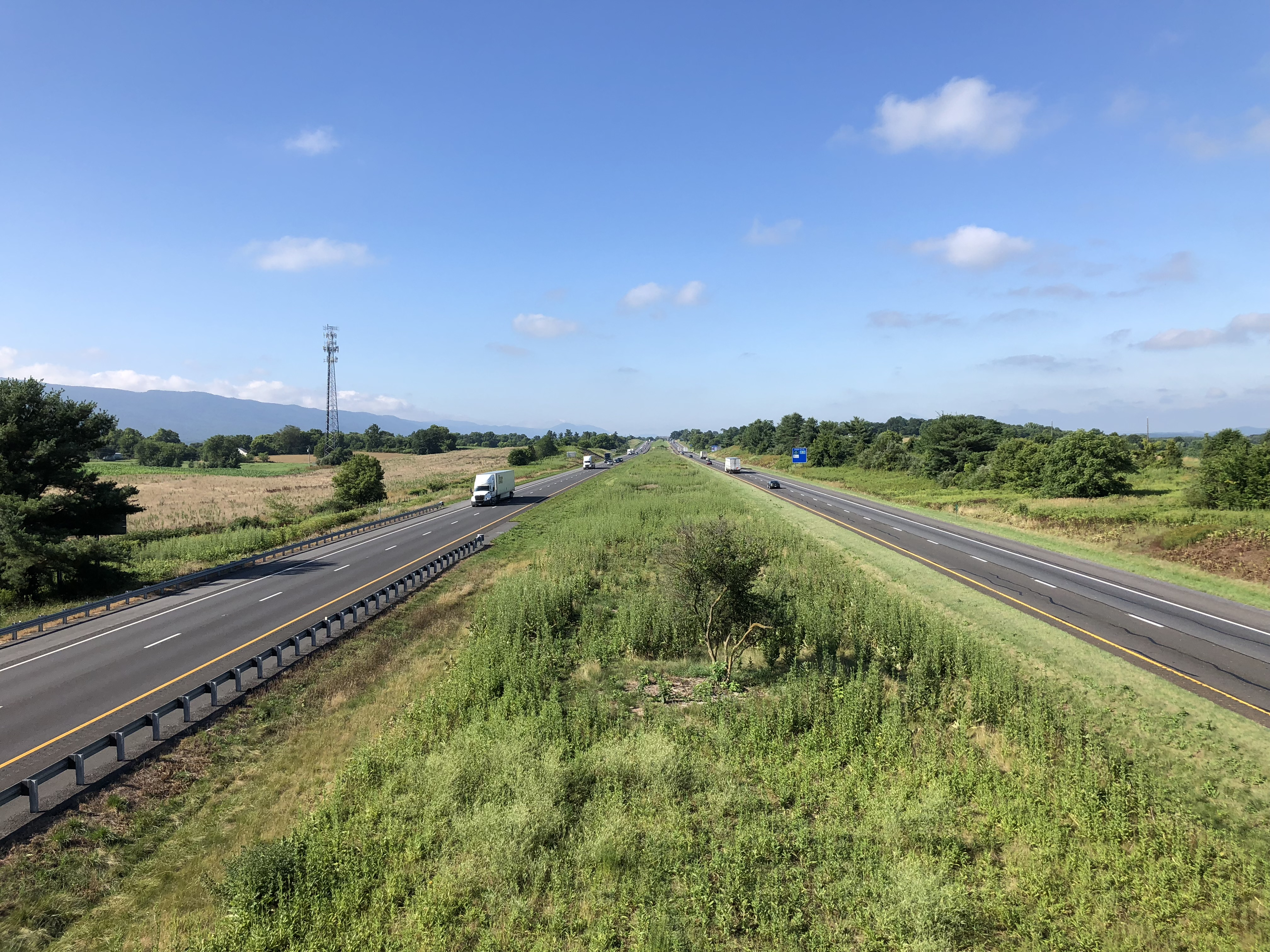
I-81 southbound in Shenandoah County

=== Major highways ===
- I-81
- US 11
- US 48
- US 211
- SR 42
- SR 55
- SR 211
- SR 263

== Demographics ==
Historical population
| Census | Pop. | Note | %± |
|---|---|---|---|
| 1790 | 10,510 | | — |
| 1800 | 13,823 | | 31.5% |
| 1810 | 13,646 | | −1.3% |
| 1820 | 18,926 | | 38.7% |
| 1830 | 19,750 | | 4.4% |
| 1840 | 11,618 | | −41.2% |
| 1850 | 13,768 | | 18.5% |
| 1860 | 13,896 | | 0.9% |
| 1870 | 14,936 | | 7.5% |
| 1880 | 18,204 | | 21.9% |
| 1890 | 19,671 | | 8.1% |
| 1900 | 20,253 | | 3.0% |
| 1910 | 20,942 | | 3.4% |
| 1920 | 20,808 | | −0.6% |
| 1930 | 20,655 | | −0.7% |
| 1940 | 20,898 | | 1.2% |
| 1950 | 21,169 | | 1.3% |
| 1960 | 21,825 | | 3.1% |
| 1970 | 22,852 | | 4.7% |
| 1980 | 27,559 | | 20.6% |
| 1990 | 31,636 | | 14.8% |
| 2000 | 35,075 | | 10.9% |
| 2010 | 41,993 | | 19.7% |
| 2020 | 44,186 | | 5.2% |
| 2025 (est.) | 45,839 | ▲ | 3.7% |
US Decennial Census; 1790–1960 1900–1990; 1990–2000 2010 2020

=== Racial and ethnic composition ===
Shenandoah County, Virginia – Racial and ethnic composition Note: the US Census treats Hispanic/Latino as an ethnic category. This table excludes Latinos from the racial categories and assigns them to a separate category. Hispanics/Latinos may be of any race.
| Race / Ethnicity (NH = Non-Hispanic) | Pop 1980 | Pop 1990 | Pop 2000 | Pop 2010 | Pop 2020 | % 1980 | % 1990 | % 2000 | % 2010 | % 2020 |
|---|---|---|---|---|---|---|---|---|---|---|
| White alone (NH) | 26,932 | 30,860 | 33,046 | 37,886 | 37,304 | 97.72% | 97.55% | 94.22% | 90.22% | 84.42% |
| Black or African American alone (NH) | 374 | 358 | 399 | 699 | 1,031 | 1.36% | 1.13% | 1.14% | 1.66% | 2.33% |
| Native American or Alaska Native alone (NH) | 33 | 25 | 45 | 71 | 84 | 0.12% | 0.08% | 0.13% | 0.17% | 0.19% |
| Asian alone (NH) | 27 | 98 | 121 | 210 | 344 | 0.10% | 0.31% | 0.34% | 0.50% | 0.78% |
| Native Hawaiian or Pacific Islander alone (NH) | x | x | 3 | 6 | 8 | x | x | 0.01% | 0.01% | 0.02% |
| Other race alone (NH) | 2 | 3 | 12 | 28 | 149 | 0.01% | 0.01% | 0.03% | 0.07% | 0.34% |
| Mixed race or Multiracial (NH) | x | x | 255 | 516 | 1,540 | x | x | 0.73% | 1.23% | 3.49% |
| Hispanic or Latino (any race) | 191 | 292 | 1,194 | 2,577 | 3,726 | 0.69% | 0.92% | 3.40% | 6.14% | 8.43% |
| Total | 27,559 | 31,636 | 35,075 | 41,993 | 44,186 | 100.00% | 100.00% | 100.00% | 100.00% | 100.00% |

=== 2020 census ===
As of the 2020 census, the county had a population of 44,186. The median age was 44.9 years. 21.1% of residents were under the age of 18 and 22.4% of residents were 65 years of age or older. For every 100 females there were 94.8 males, and for every 100 females age 18 and over there were 92.8 males age 18 and over.

The racial makeup of the county was 86.4% White, 2.5% Black or African American, 0.4% American Indian and Alaska Native, 0.8% Asian, 0.0% Native Hawaiian and Pacific Islander, 3.9% from some other race, and 6.0% from two or more races. Hispanic or Latino residents of any race comprised 8.4% of the population.

30.4% of residents lived in urban areas, while 69.6% lived in rural areas.

There were 18,008 households in the county, of which 27.2% had children under the age of 18 living with them and 25.7% had a female householder with no spouse or partner present. About 27.5% of all households were made up of individuals and 14.2% had someone living alone who was 65 years of age or older.

There were 21,136 housing units, of which 14.8% were vacant. Among occupied housing units, 71.8% were owner-occupied and 28.2% were renter-occupied. The homeowner vacancy rate was 1.9% and the rental vacancy rate was 5.8%.

=== 2010 Census ===
As of the 2010 United States census, there were 41,993 people in the county. 93.0% were White, 1.7% Black or African American, 0.5% Asian, 0.2% Native American, 2.8% of some other race and 1.6% of two or more races. 6.1% were Hispanic or Latino (of any race). 26.4% were of American, 22.0% German, 10.3% English and 7.6% Irish ancestry.

=== 2000 Census ===
As of the 2000 United States census, there were 35,075 people, 14,296 households, and 10,064 families in the county. The population density was 68 people per square mile (26 people/km^{2}). There were 16,709 housing units at an average density of 33 per square mile (13/km^{2}). The racial makeup of the county was 95.60% White, 1.17% Black or African American, 0.18% Native American, 0.35% Asian, 0.02% Pacific Islander, 1.79% from other races, and 0.89% from two or more races. 3.40% of the population were Hispanic or Latino of any race.

There were 14,296 households, out of which 28.10% had children under the age of 18 living with them, 57.00% were married couples living together, 9.30% had a female householder with no husband present, and 29.60% were non-families. 25.10% of all households were made up of individuals, and 11.30% had someone living alone who was 65 years of age or older. The average household size was 2.42 and the average family size was 2.86.

The county population contained 22.30% under the age of 18, 6.60% from 18 to 24, 27.60% from 25 to 44, 26.20% from 45 to 64, and 17.30% who were 65 years of age or older. The median age was 41 years. For every 100 females there were 94.90 males. For every 100 females age 18 and over, there were 92.80 males age 18 and over.

The median income for a household in the county was $39,173, and the median income for a family was $45,080. Males had a median income of $29,952 versus $22,312 for females. The per capita income for the county was $19,755. About 5.80% of families and 8.20% of the population were below the poverty line, including 12.10% of those under age 18 and 8.80% of those age 65 or over.

== Education ==
=== Private ===
==== Secondary institutions ====
- Shenandoah Valley Academy
- Massanutten Military Academy

==== Primary institutions ====
- Shenandoah Valley Adventist Elementary School
- Valley Baptist Christian School

=== Public ===
==== High schools ====
- Stonewall Jackson High School (Shenandoah County, Virginia)
- Strasburg High School
- Central High School (Woodstock)

==== Elementary and middle schools ====
- W.W. Robinson Elementary School (Woodstock)
- Peter Muhlenberg Middle School (Woodstock)
- Ashby-Lee Elementary School (Quicksburg)
- North Fork Middle School (Quicksburg)
- Sandy Hook Elementary School (Strasburg)
- Signal Knob Middle School (Strasburg)

==== Other ====
- Triplett Tech (Mount Jackson)
- Massanutten Regional Governor's School (High School level, in Quicksburg)

== Communities ==
=== Towns ===
- Edinburg (pop. 1,070)
- Mount Jackson (pop. 2,118)
- New Market (pop. 2,155)
- Strasburg (pop. 7,083)
- Toms Brook (pop. 272)
- Woodstock (pop. 5,258)

=== Census-designated places ===
- Basye (pop. 1,374)
- Maurertown (pop. 770)
- Mount Clifton

=== Other unincorporated communities ===
- Alonzaville
- Bedford
- Borden
- Bowmans Crossing
- Calvary
- Carmel
- Clary
- Coleytown
- Columbia Furnace
- Conicville
- Detrick
- Fishers Hill
- Forestville
- Hamburg
- Harrisville
- Hawkinstown
- Hepners
- Hudson Crossroads
- Jadwyn
- Jerome
- Kings Crossing
- Lantz Mill
- Lebanon Church
- Locust Grove
- Macanie
- Moore's Store
- Mount Hermon
- Mount Olive
- Oak Grove
- Oranda
- Orkney Springs
- Quicksburg
- Saint Luke
- Saumsville
- Silver City
- Swover Creek
- Valley View
- Walkers Chapel
- Wesley Chapel
- Wheatfield
- Williamsville
- Zepp

== Law enforcement ==
Shenandoah County Sheriff's Office
- Abbreviation: SCSO

Agency overview
- Formed: May 26, 1772
- Employees: 100+

Jurisdictional structure
- Constituting instrument: Yes
- General nature: Local civilian police

Operational structure
- Headquarters: Woodstock, Virginia
- Agency executive: Timothy C. Carter, Sheriff

Website
- Official Website

The Shenandoah County Sheriff's Office (SCSO) is the primary law enforcement agency in Shenandoah County. The SCSO was created on May 26, 1772, when the position of High Sheriff position was created; its main duty was to collect taxes.

The SCSO was accredited by the Virginia Law Enforcement Professional Standards Commission between 2006, when it first became accredited, and 2022, when it lost accreditation following an evaluation.

== Politics ==
Politically, Shenandoah County is one of the most consistently Republican counties in Virginia, a trend that predates the rest of western Virginia moving away from the Democratic Party. It was first won by a Republican presidential nominee in 1896, and has voted Republican in every presidential election since 1936, and in all but one election since 1920. It has also voted Republican in every gubernatorial election since 1961, and has not given a Democratic gubernatorial nominee a majority since 1949. Nearly solidly Democratic before 1900, the county began voting Republican in statewide elections around the beginning of the 20th century but was a swing county. In the 1920s it became solidly Republican at a statewide level, with the exception of Democratic local heroes Harry F. Byrd and his son. This early swing to the GOP came from the county's rural voters being overwhelmingly German American Republicans, which overpowered the conservative Southern Democrat vote in the county population centers of New Market, Woodstock, and Strasburg. The Virginia Constitutional Convention of 1902 was vehemently opposed by the counties of western Virginia due to the impact on racial equality and disenfranchisement of the many poor whites of the region. The once strong Democratic county turned Republican due to this convention, which, according to the Shenandoah Herald, was "the death knell of the Democratic party in the Valley counties." The Democrats of the county were of the Jacksonian, small government stock; leading them to vote Republican after the perceived injustice by the state convention in the creation of a new constitution, which was not ratified by popular vote. The county briefly returned to its Southern Democrat roots at the state level during the civil rights movement.

In 1856, Shenandoah was the only county in Virginia to record votes in favor of the candidate of the newly formed Republican Party, John C. Frémont.

United States presidential election results for Shenandoah County, Virginia
| Year | Republican | | Democratic | | Third party(ies) | |
| Year | No. | % | No. | % | No. | % |
|---|---|---|---|---|---|---|
| 1880 | 350 | 11.23% | 2,768 | 88.77% | 0 | 0.00% |
| 1884 | 1,872 | 48.65% | 1,976 | 51.35% | 0 | 0.00% |
| 1888 | 2,063 | 48.44% | 2,164 | 50.81% | 32 | 0.75% |
| 1892 | 1,705 | 40.26% | 2,315 | 54.66% | 215 | 5.08% |
| 1896 | 2,102 | 49.44% | 2,052 | 48.26% | 98 | 2.30% |
| 1900 | 1,862 | 48.09% | 1,965 | 50.75% | 45 | 1.16% |
| 1904 | 1,189 | 51.32% | 1,098 | 47.39% | 30 | 1.29% |
| 1908 | 1,449 | 52.31% | 1,294 | 46.71% | 27 | 0.97% |
| 1912 | 706 | 27.61% | 1,336 | 52.25% | 515 | 20.14% |
| 1916 | 1,425 | 48.70% | 1,440 | 49.21% | 61 | 2.08% |
| 1920 | 2,683 | 56.05% | 2,077 | 43.39% | 27 | 0.56% |
| 1924 | 2,214 | 48.80% | 2,186 | 48.18% | 137 | 3.02% |
| 1928 | 3,420 | 68.28% | 1,589 | 31.72% | 0 | 0.00% |
| 1932 | 2,514 | 48.19% | 2,635 | 50.51% | 68 | 1.30% |
| 1936 | 3,152 | 52.29% | 2,861 | 47.46% | 15 | 0.25% |
| 1940 | 3,527 | 58.87% | 2,450 | 40.89% | 14 | 0.23% |
| 1944 | 3,517 | 64.12% | 1,962 | 35.77% | 6 | 0.11% |
| 1948 | 3,349 | 64.65% | 1,603 | 30.95% | 228 | 4.40% |
| 1952 | 4,284 | 71.12% | 1,734 | 28.78% | 6 | 0.10% |
| 1956 | 4,164 | 69.18% | 1,769 | 29.39% | 86 | 1.43% |
| 1960 | 4,144 | 66.85% | 2,053 | 33.12% | 2 | 0.03% |
| 1964 | 3,981 | 55.54% | 3,184 | 44.42% | 3 | 0.04% |
| 1968 | 5,461 | 62.91% | 1,654 | 19.05% | 1,566 | 18.04% |
| 1972 | 7,128 | 82.46% | 1,422 | 16.45% | 94 | 1.09% |
| 1976 | 6,296 | 64.05% | 3,364 | 34.22% | 170 | 1.73% |
| 1980 | 7,517 | 67.10% | 3,137 | 28.00% | 549 | 4.90% |
| 1984 | 9,048 | 76.03% | 2,771 | 23.29% | 81 | 0.68% |
| 1988 | 8,612 | 71.74% | 3,276 | 27.29% | 116 | 0.97% |
| 1992 | 7,746 | 55.74% | 3,956 | 28.47% | 2,194 | 15.79% |
| 1996 | 7,440 | 56.02% | 4,224 | 31.81% | 1,616 | 12.17% |
| 2000 | 9,636 | 66.68% | 4,420 | 30.58% | 396 | 2.74% |
| 2004 | 11,820 | 68.94% | 5,186 | 30.25% | 140 | 0.82% |
| 2008 | 12,005 | 62.45% | 6,912 | 35.96% | 306 | 1.59% |
| 2012 | 12,538 | 64.72% | 6,469 | 33.39% | 366 | 1.89% |
| 2016 | 14,094 | 68.71% | 5,273 | 25.71% | 1,146 | 5.59% |
| 2020 | 16,463 | 69.51% | 6,836 | 28.86% | 385 | 1.63% |
| 2024 | 17,215 | 70.30% | 6,914 | 28.23% | 360 | 1.47% |

== See also ==
- National Register of Historic Places listings in Shenandoah County, Virginia
- New Market Airport
- Shenandoah County Sheriff’s Office
- Shenandoah Local History Collection at James Madison University's Special Collections
- Shenandoah Valley Miscellaneous Ledgers, Minute Books and Registers collection at James Madison University's Special Collections
- The Stone and Holt Weeks Foundation
