= Nicelytown, Virginia =

Unincorporated community in Virginia, United States

Coordinates: 37°50′29″N 79°44′54″W

Nicelytown is an unincorporated community in Alleghany County, Virginia, United States.
