= New Market, Virginia =

- Town
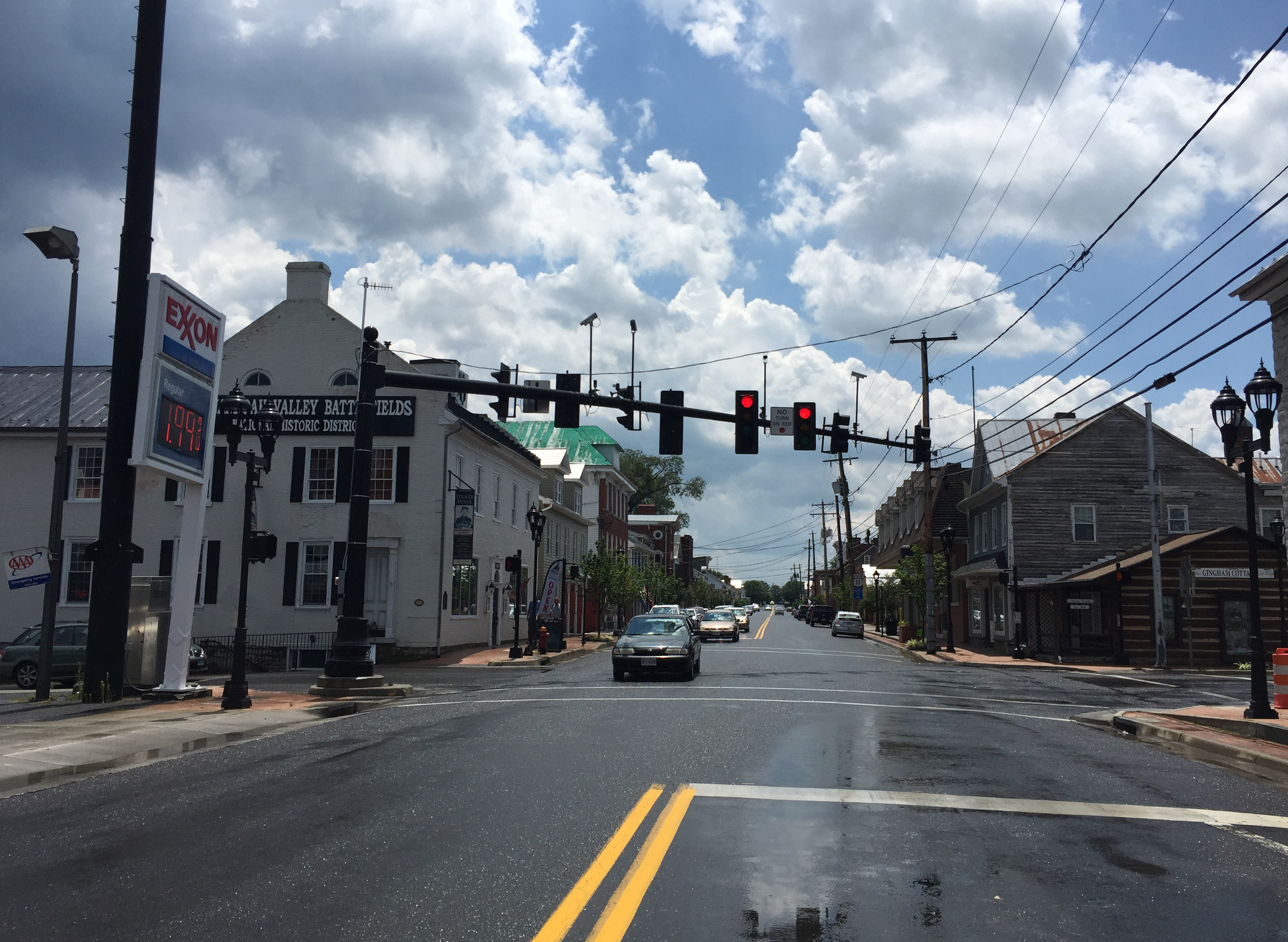
- Downtown New Market

- Logo

- Location within Shenandoah Valley Location within Virginia Location within the United States
- Coordinates: 38°38′40″N 78°40′24″W
- Country: United States
- State: Virginia
- County: Shenandoah

Area
  - Total: 2.03 sq mi (5.27 km^{2})
  - Land: 2.02 sq mi (5.23 km^{2})
  - Water: 0.015 sq mi (0.04 km^{2})
- Elevation: 1,053 ft (321 m)

Population (2020)
  - Total: 2,155
  - Density: 1,066/sq mi (411.7/km^{2})
- Time zone: UTC−5 (Eastern (EST))
  - Summer (DST): UTC−4 (EDT)
- ZIP code: 22844
- Area code: 540
- FIPS code: 51-55848
- GNIS feature ID: 1497040
- Website: Town of New Market

New Market is a town in Shenandoah County, Virginia, United States. Founded as a small crossroads trading town in the Shenandoah Valley, it has a population of 2,155 as of the most recent 2020 U.S. census. The north–south U.S. 11 and the east–west U.S. 211 pass near it and cross Massanutten Mountain at the town's titular gap.

It is home to the New Market Shockers of the Rockingham County Baseball League, the New Market Rebels of the Valley Baseball League, the Schultz Theatre and School of Performing Arts, and the Shenvalee Golf Course. The town is known for having been the site on May 15, 1864 of one of the last major Confederate victories in the Shenandoah Valley during the American Civil War.

== History ==
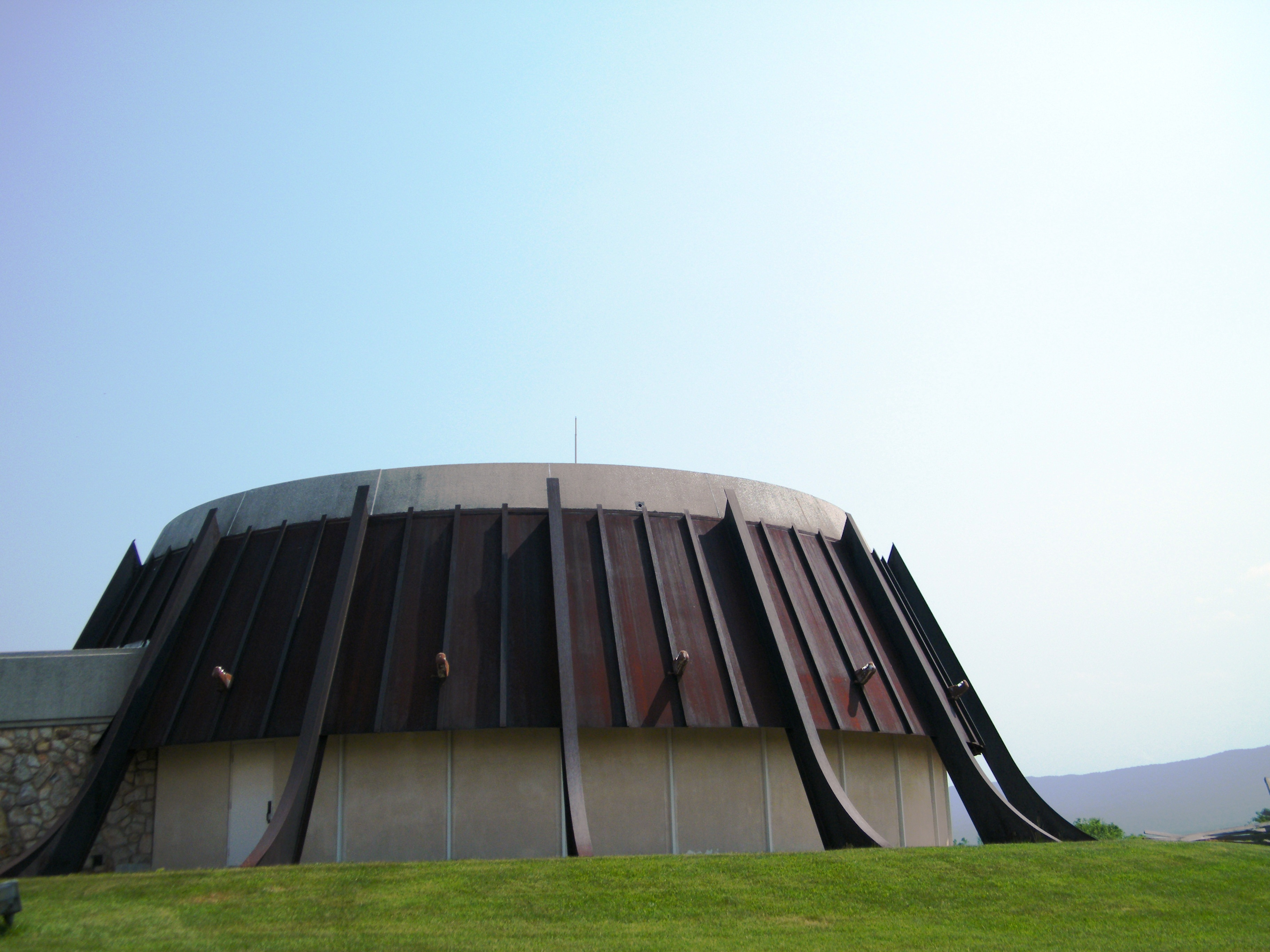
Virginia Civil War Museum at New Market Battlefield State Historical Park

In 1745, John Sevier, later a Revolutionary War commander, first governor of the temporary State of Franklin, and first and six-term Governor of Tennessee, was born in this town.

On Friday, June 13, 1862, New Market was the site of a skirmish in the American Civil War between a small Union Army and a small Confederate Army. Warfare returned in the Valley Campaigns of 1864. On May 15, 1864, New Market was the site of the Battle of New Market. Students from the Virginia Military Institute fought alongside the Confederate Army and forced Union General Franz Sigel and his army out of the Shenandoah Valley. Every year VMI cadets commemorate the 85-mile march from Lexington to New Market made by the cadets in 1864, who finished with their victorious charge at the Battle of New Market.

The New Market Historic District and New Market Battlefield State Historical Park are listed on the National Register of Historic Places.

== Geography ==
New Market is located at 38°38′40″N 78°40′24″W (38.644472, −78.673403).

According to the United States Census Bureau, the town has a total area of 2.0 square miles (5.2 km^{2}), all land.

== Climate ==
The climate in this area is characterized by hot, humid summers and generally mild to cool winters. According to the Köppen Climate Classification system, New Market has a humid subtropical climate, abbreviated "Cfa" on climate maps.

== Schools ==
A number of schools are located in and around New Market. Shenandoah Valley Academy and Shenandoah Valley Adventist Elementary School are private schools in the town. Also located near New Market are Stonewall Jackson High School and Massanutten Military Academy, as well as a number of primary schools.

== Demographics ==
Historical population
Census	Pop.	Note	%±
1860	747		—
1870	600		−19.7%
1880	662		10.3%
1890	607		−8.3%
1900	684		12.7%
1910	638		−6.7%
1920	577		−9.6%
1930	640		10.9%
1940	629		−1.7%
1950	701		11.4%
1960	783		11.7%
1970	718		−8.3%
1980	1,118		55.7%
1990	1,435		28.4%
2000	1,637		14.1%
2010	2,146		31.1%
2020	2,155		0.4%
U.S. Decennial Census

As of the census of 2000, 1,637 people, 737 households, and 431 families resided in the town. The population density was 819.6 people per square mile (316.0/km^{2}). There were 808 housing units at an average density of 404.6 per square mile (156.0/km^{2}). The racial makeup of the town was 93.77% White, 1.10% Black, 0.67% Asian, 3.97% from other races, and 0.49% from two or more races. Hispanics or Latinos of any race were 6.96% of the population.

Of the 737 households, 22.1% had children under the age of 18 living with them, 45.5% were married couples living together, 10.3% had a female householder with no husband present, and 41.4% were not families. About 36.0% of all households were made up of individuals, and 18.0% had someone living alone who was 65 years of age or older. The average household size was 2.13 and the average family size was 2.72.

In the town, the population was distributed as 18.4% under the age of 18, 8.3% from 18 to 24, 25.7% from 25 to 44, 25.7% from 45 to 64, and 21.9% who were 65 years of age or older. The median age was 43 years. For every 100 females, there were 89.5 males. For every 100 females aged 18 and over, there were 87.4 males.

The median income for a household in the town was $32,365, and the median income for a family was $48,036. Males had a median income of $29,750 versus $23,462 for females. The per capita income for the town was $20,480. About 7.6% of families and 12.0% of the population were below the poverty line, including 11.3% of those under age 18 and 12.3% of those age 65 or over.

== Transportation ==
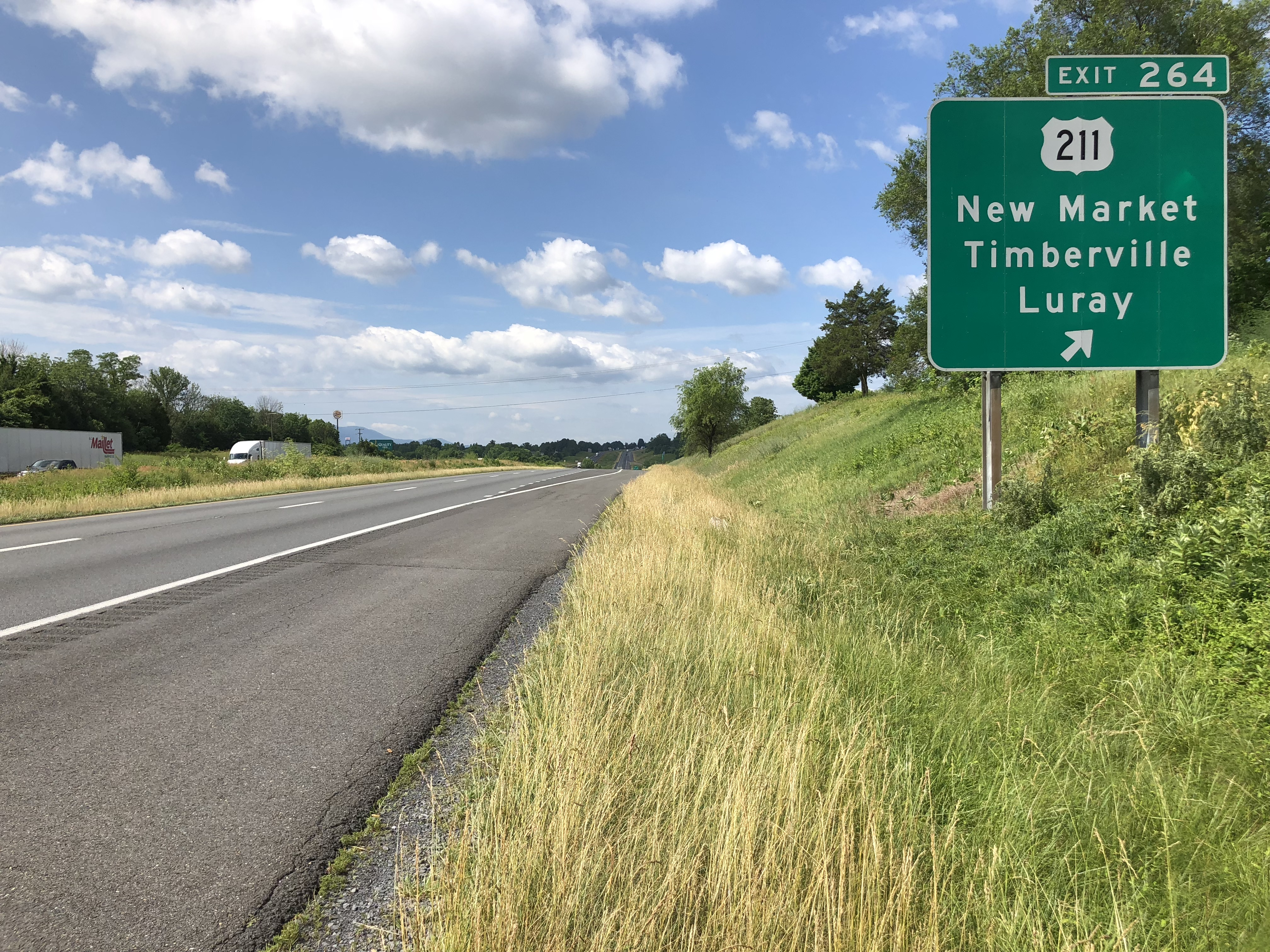
View south along I-81 at the exit for New Market

=== Major highways ===
The main highway providing access to New Market is Interstate 81. Within the town limits, I-81 has a junction with U.S. Route 211 and Virginia State Route 211, which head east to Luray and west to Timberville, respectively. U.S. Route 11 also passes through New Market, serving as the main street through the town and as a local service road to I-81.

Running west parallel to I-81 on the western side of the town is Virginia State Route 305, which serves the Virginia Museum of the Civil War.

=== Public transportation ===
Since October 2021, public transportation in New Market as well as the rest of Shenandoah County has been provided by the ShenGo commuter bus service, which is operated by Virginia Regional Transit.

== See also ==
- New Market Airport
