= Virginia State Route 254 =

State highway in Virginia, United States

State Route 254

Route information
- Maintained by VDOT
- Length: 25.01 mi (40.25 km)
- Existed: 1933–present

Major junctions
- West end: SR 42 near Buffalo Gap
- US 11 / US 250 in Staunton; SR 262 near Staunton; US 250 in Waynesboro
- East end: US 340 in Waynesboro

Location
- Country: United States
- State: Virginia
- Counties: Augusta, City of Staunton, City of Waynesboro

Highway system
- Virginia Routes; Interstate; US; Primary; Secondary; Byways; History; HOT lanes
← SR 253	→ SR 255

State Route 254 (SR 254) is a primary state highway in the U.S. state of Virginia. The state highway runs 25.01 miles (40.25 km) from SR 42 near Buffalo Gap east to U.S. Route 340 (US 340) in Waynesboro. SR 254 provides a northerly alternate route to US 250 between Waynesboro and Staunton, where the highway provides access to the Woodrow Wilson Presidential Library.

== Route description ==
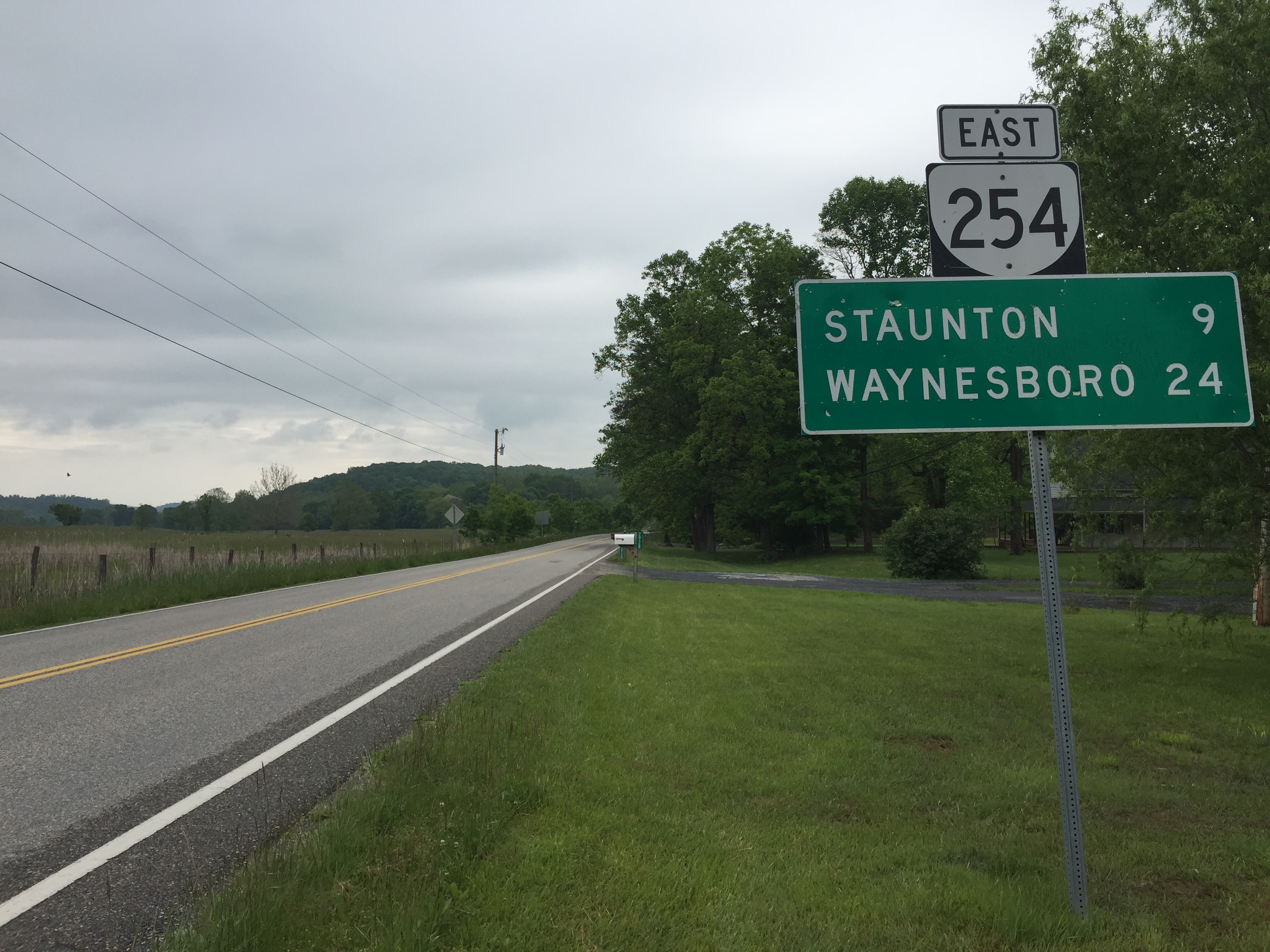
View east from the west end of SR 254 at SR 42 in Buffalo Gap

SR 254 begins at an intersection with SR 42 in the hamlet of Buffalo Gap. SR 42 heads west as Parkersburg Turnpike through the namesake water gap in Little North Mountain, and north as Buffalo Gap Highway. SR 254 heads east as two-lane undivided Parkersburg Turnpike, which crosses the Middle River and enters the city of Staunton at its diamond interchange with SR 262 (Woodrow Wilson Parkway). The state highway continues as Beverley Street toward downtown Staunton, where the highway splits into a one-way pair, Beverley Street eastbound and Frederick Street westbound. SR 254 soon intersects US 250 and US 11 Business, which follow Augusta Street south and New Street north. SR 254 passes the American Shakespeare Center, Mary Baldwin College, and the Woodrow Wilson Presidential Library in the eastern part of downtown. The one-way pair concludes at Coalter Street, which westbound SR 254 uses to reach Frederick Street. Beverley Street continues east to the Virginia School for the Deaf and the Blind campus while the state highway turns south onto Coalter Street.

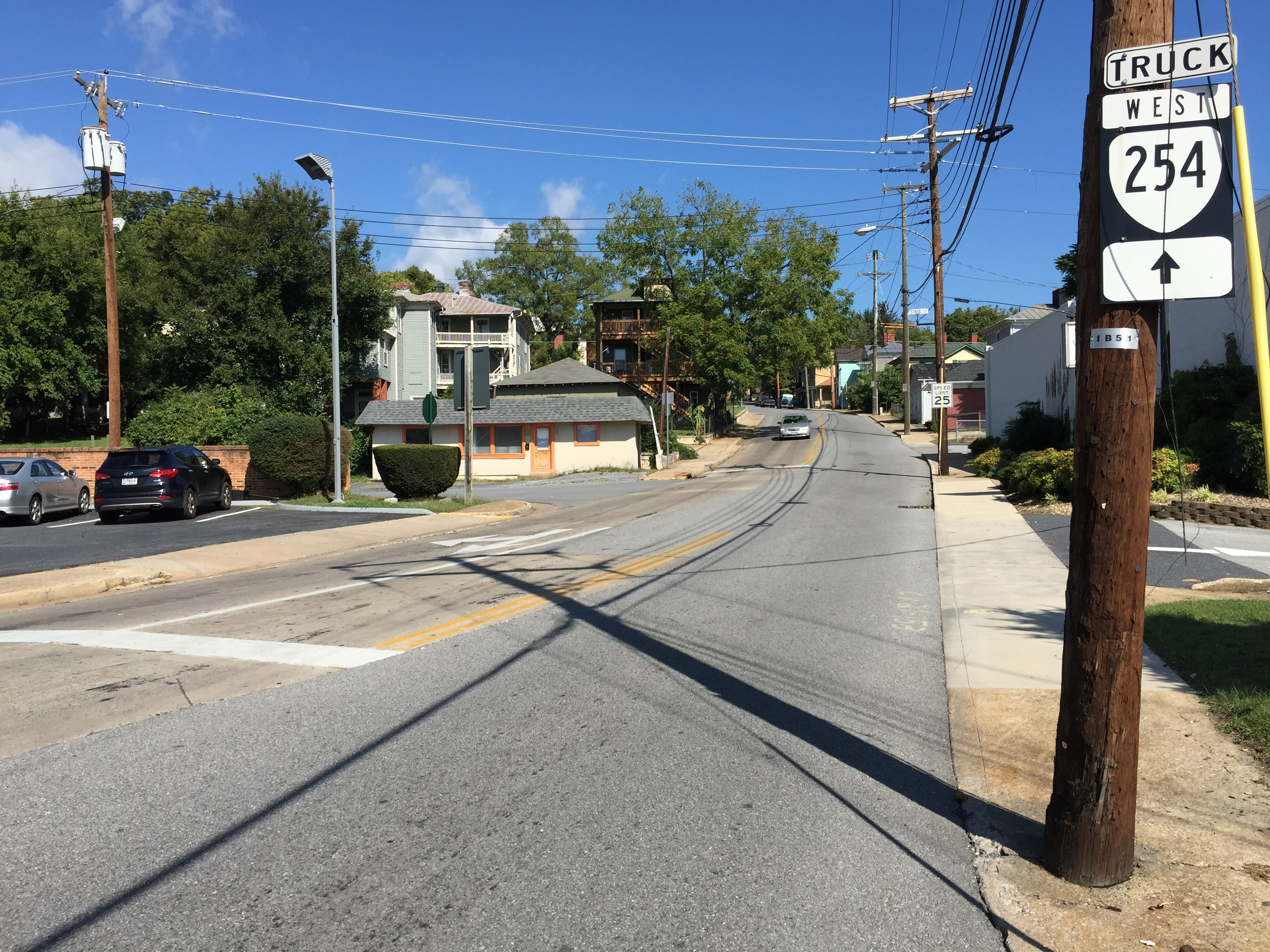
View west along SR 254 Truck at US 11/US 11 Bus./US 250/SR 254 in Staunton

Two blocks to the south, SR 254 has a four-way intersection with US 11, US 250, and US 11 Business, for which the intersection serves as its southern terminus. US 250 and US 11 Business head west on Greenville Street, US 11 and US 250 head south on Greenville Street underneath CSX's North Mountain Subdivision, and SR 254 and US 11 head east on Commerce Road, a four-lane divided highway. The two highways parallel the railroad to New Hope Road; SR 254 leaves US 11 via a two-way ramp to join New Hope Road, which passes under both US 11 and the railroad. SR 254 intersects SR 261 (Statler Boulevard) and leaves of its overpass of Interstate 81. The state highway veers northeast to meet the northern terminus of SR 262 (Woodrow Wilson Boulevard). SR 254 continues east as Hermitage Road, which crosses Christians Creek and gradually curves southeast and south to the city of Waynesboro. The state highway enters the city as Ivy Street, then turns south onto Poplar Street and has a grade crossing of the CSX rail line. SR 254 intersects US 250 (Broad Street) one block north of its eastern terminus at US 340 (Main Street) at the west end of downtown Waynesboro.

== Major intersections ==
County	Location	mi	km	Destinations	Notes
Augusta	Buffalo Gap	0.00	0.00	SR 42 (Buffalo Gap Highway / Parkersburg Turnpike) – Craigsville, Clifton Forge, Churchville, Harrisonburg	Western terminus
Augusta		2.65	4.26	SR 876 (Swoope Road) – Swoope	former SR 56 east
Augusta		5.82	9.37	SR 612 (Frog Pond Road) to US 250	former SR 56 west
Augusta		7.03	11.31	SR 262 to I-81	Diamond interchange
City of Staunton		9.53	15.34	US 11 Bus. north / US 250 west (Augusta Street)	West end of eastbound concurrency with US 11 Bus / US 250
City of Staunton		9.60	15.45	West Johnson Street / South Augusta Street to SR 252 – Montgomery Hall Park, Staunton AMTRAK Station, Middlebrook	Eastbound direct access only
City of Staunton		9.91	15.95	US 11 south / US 250 east (Greenville Avenue) to I-81 – Frontier Culture Museum of Virginia	East end of eastbound concurrency with US 11 Bus. / US 250; west end of concurrency with US 11
City of Staunton		10.59	17.04	US 11 north (Commerce Road) – Verona	East end of concurrency with US 11
City of Staunton		10.85	17.46	SR 261 / US 11 Truck / US 250 Truck (Statler Boulevard)	
Augusta	Annex	14.63	23.54	SR 262 south (Woodrow Wilson Parkway) to I-81 / US 11	Northern terminus of SR 262
City of Waynesboro		24.94	40.14	US 250 / US 340 Truck (West Broad Street)	
City of Waynesboro		25.01	40.25	US 340 (Main Street) / Poplar Street	Eastern terminus
1.000 mi = 1.609 km; 1.000 km = 0.621 mi: Concurrency terminus; Incomplete access

none	Spurs of SR 17; 1923–1928	SR 172 >
< SR 809	District 8 State Routes; 1928–1933	SR 811 >
< SR 830	District 8 State Routes; 1928–1933	SR 832 >
