= Virginia State Route 252 =

State highway in Virginia, United States

State Route 252

Route information
- Maintained by VDOT
- Length: 29.06 mi (46.77 km)
- Existed: 1933–present
- Tourist routes: Virginia Byway

Major junctions
- South end: SR 39 near Rockbridge Baths
- SR 262 near Staunton
- North end: US 250 / US 11 Bus. / SR 254 in Staunton

Location
- Country: United States
- State: Virginia
- Counties: Rockbridge, Augusta, City of Staunton

Highway system
- Virginia Routes; Interstate; US; Primary; Secondary; Byways; History; HOT lanes
← SR 251	→ SR 253

State Route 252 (SR 252) is a primary state highway in the U.S. state of Virginia. The state highway runs 29.06 miles (46.77 km) from SR 39 near Rockbridge Baths north to U.S. Route 250, US 11 Business, and SR 254 in Staunton. SR 252 passes through rural areas of the upper Shenandoah Valley of northern Rockbridge County and western Augusta County.

== Route description ==
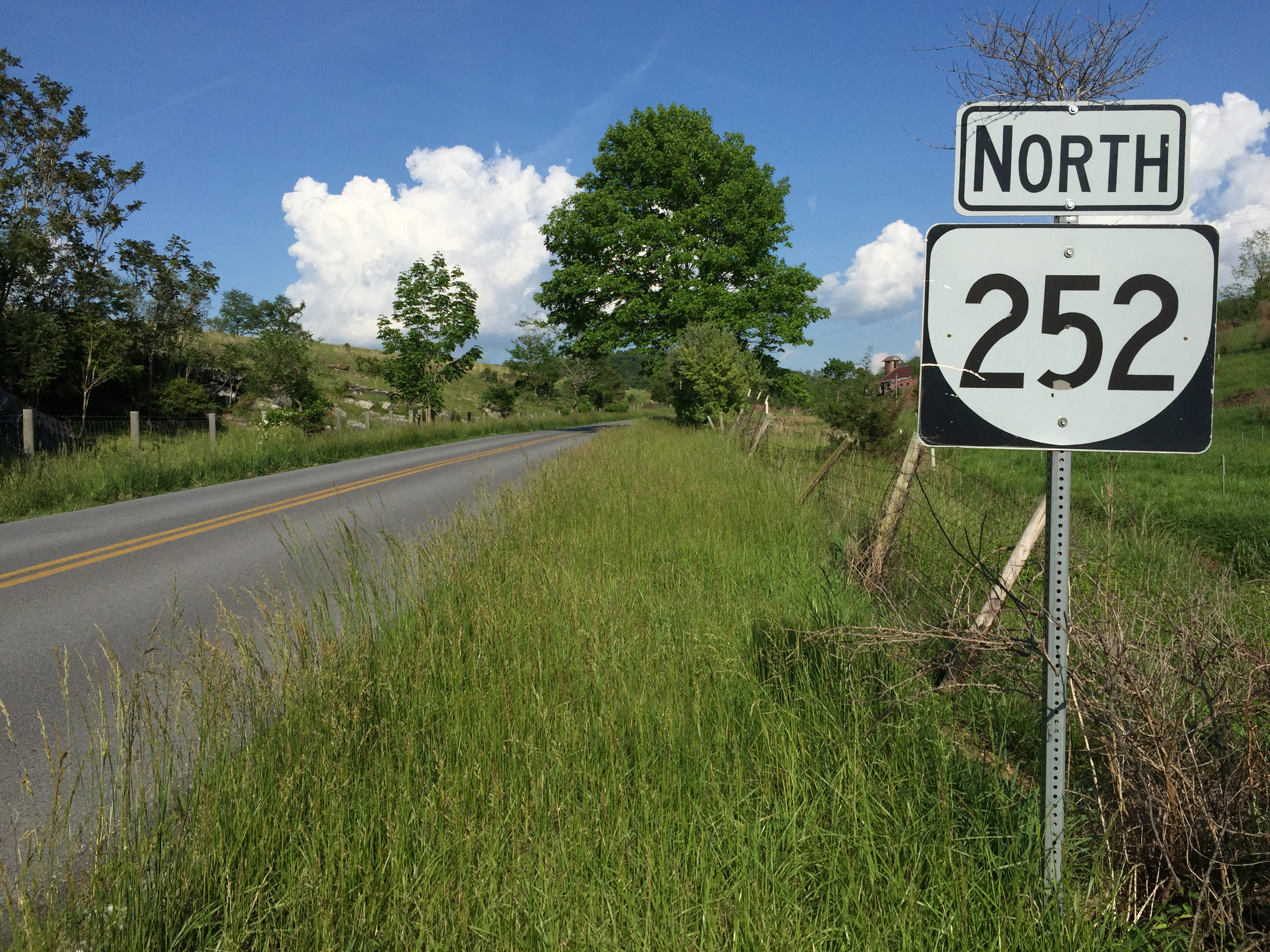
View north along SR 252 near SR 682 near Newport

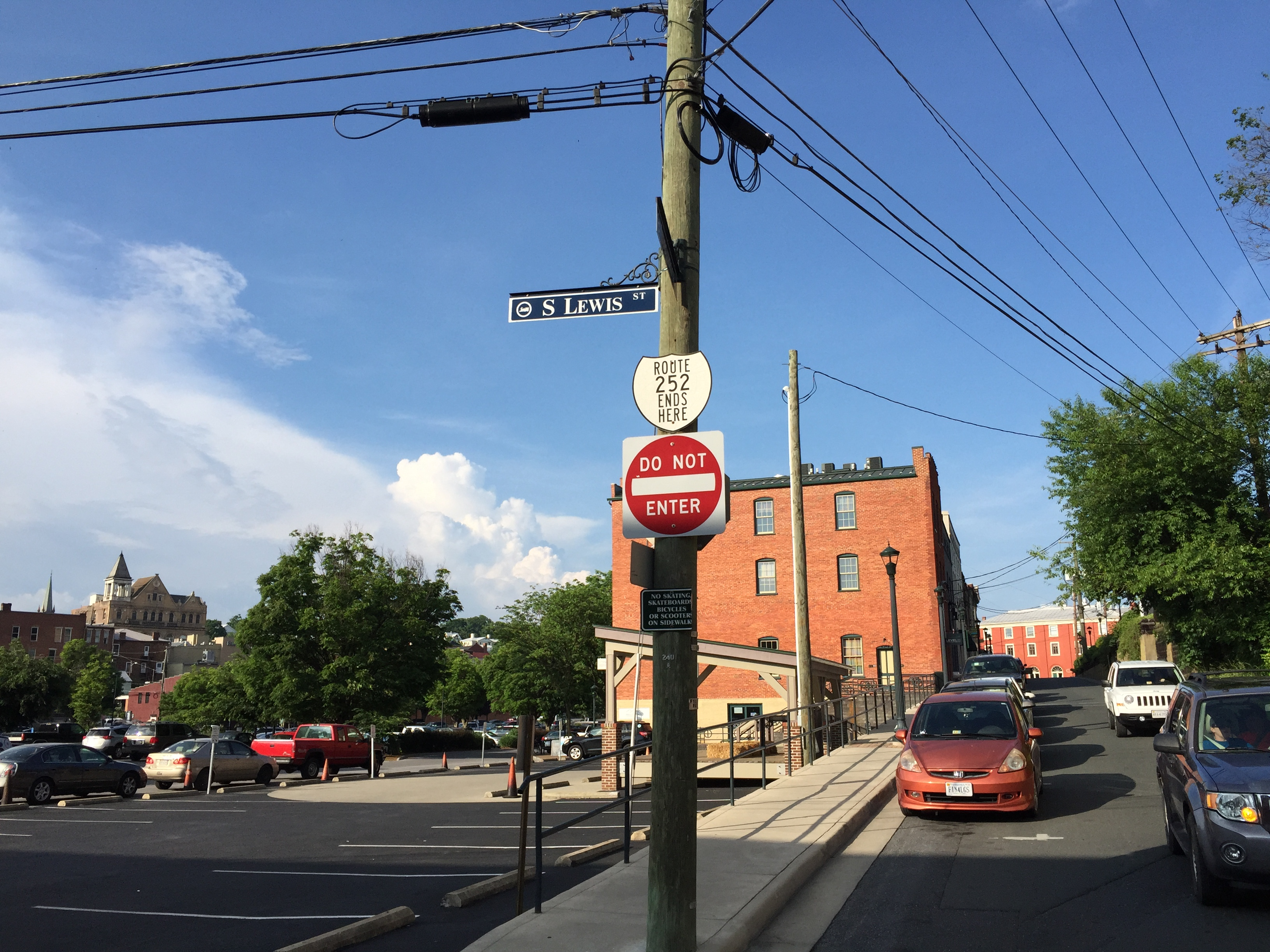
Sign marking the north end of SR 252 at Lewis Street in Staunton

SR 252 begins at an acute intersection with SR 39 (Maury River Road) just east of the Maury River near Rockbridge Baths. The state highway heads northeast as two-lane undivided Brownsburg Turnpike, which passes through the village of Brownsburg. SR 252 veers north at SR 606 (Raphine Road), which leads to the historic Kennedy-Wade Mill, and follows Moffatts Creek into Augusta County, where the highway becomes Middlebrook Road. The state highway follows the creek northeast through the village of Newport to its headwaters. Moffatts Creek's source is just south of Middlebrook at the drainage divide between the James River watershed and the Shenandoah River watershed. SR 252 has a partial cloverleaf interchange with SR 262 (Woodrow Wilson Parkway), a circumferential highway around Staunton, before entering the independent city. The state highway follows Middlebrook Avenue to the downtown area, where it passes under CSX's North Mountain Subdivision. SR 262 turns north onto Lewis Street, then east onto Beverley Street, a one-way street that carries eastbound SR 254. Westbound SR 254 follows Frederick Street one block to the north. SR 252 and SR 254 run concurrently two blocks east to SR 252's northern terminus at Augusta Street, which hosts eastbound US 250 and southbound US 11 Business. Westbound US 250 and northbound US 11 Business are accessed at New Street one block to the east.

== Major intersections ==
County	Location	mi	km	Destinations	Notes
Rockbridge	Cedar Grove	0.00	0.00	SR 39 (Maury River Road)	Southern terminus
Augusta				SR 620 (Newport Road)	former SR 56 east
Augusta				SR 682 (McKinley Road) – McKinley	former SR 56 west
Augusta	Middlebrook			SR 876 (Mish Barn Road)	former SR 292 west
Augusta				SR 701 (Howardsville Road) to US 11	former SR 292 east
Augusta		27.12	43.65	SR 262 to I-64 / I-81	Partial cloverleaf interchange
City of Staunton				South Lewis Street / Middlebrook Avenue	Northern terminus
1.000 mi = 1.609 km; 1.000 km = 0.621 mi

< SR 807	District 8 State Routes; 1928–1933	SR 809 >
