= Virginia State Route 275 =

The following state routes in Virginia have been numbered 275:

- Virginia State Route 275 (1933-1940), now part of SR 259
- Virginia State Route 275 (1941-1954), now SR 671 in Loudoun County
- Virginia State Route 275 (pre-2006), now part of SR 262
