= U.S. Route 250 Truck =

U.S. Route 250 Truck may refer to:

- Virginia State Route 261
- U.S. Route 250 Truck (Philippi, West Virginia)
