= Yancey Mills, Virginia =

Unincorporated community in Virginia, United States

Yancey Mills
- Unincorporated community
- Location within the state of Virginia Yancey Mills (the United States)
- Coordinates: 38°2′48″N 78°43′31″W
- Country: United States
- State: Virginia
- County: Albemarle
- Time zone: UTC−5 (Eastern (EST))
  - Summer (DST): UTC−4 (EDT)
- GNIS feature ID: 1493564

Yancey Mills is an unincorporated community in Albemarle County, Virginia, United States.

== Geography ==
Today, Yancey Mills is the site of the intersection of U.S. Route 250 and Interstate 64, the location of Western Albemarle High School, Henley Middle School, Brownsville Elementary School, and a pair of gas stations.

Location of Yancey Mills within the Albemarle County

== History ==
It is named for Charles Yancey, a businessman who ran a tavern, store, mill, and distillery in the area, which became known as Yancey's Mill. A post office was established there, though was eventually moved to nearby Hillsboro. The mill still stands, under the name of R.A. Yancey Lumber Corporation.

The Miller School of Albemarle was added to the National Register of Historic Places in 1974.

The Piedmont Baptist Church is a historically Black church in Yancey Mills. In 1974, the church was the site of NAACP meetings.
