= U.S. Route 250 in Virginia =

Segment of American highway

U.S. Route 250
- US 250 highlighted in red

Route information
- Maintained by VDOT
- Length: 166.74 mi (268.34 km)
- Existed: 1934–present
- Tourist routes: Journey Through Hallowed Ground Byway; Virginia Byway

Major junctions
- West end: US 250 near Hightown
- US 11 in Staunton; I-81 near Staunton; US 340 in Waynesboro; US 29 in Charlottesville; US 15 in Zion Crossroads; US 522 in Gum Spring; I-64 in Short Pump and Richmond; US 33 / SR 33 in Richmond; US 1 / US 301 in Richmond; I-95 in Richmond
- East end: US 360 in Richmond

Location
- Country: United States
- State: Virginia
- Counties: Highland, Augusta, City of Staunton, City of Waynesboro, Nelson, Albemarle, City of Charlottesville, Fluvanna, Louisa, Goochland, Henrico, City of Richmond

Highway system
- United States Numbered Highway System; List; Special; Divided; Virginia Routes; Interstate; US; Primary; Secondary; Byways; History; HOT lanes
← SR 249	→ SR 251

U.S. Route 250 (US 250) is a part of the U.S. Highway System that runs from Sandusky, Ohio to Richmond, Virginia. In Virginia, the highway runs 166.74 miles (268.34 km) from the West Virginia state line near Hightown east to its eastern terminus at US 360 in Richmond. US 250 is the main east–west highway of Highland County, which is known as Virginia's Little Switzerland; the highway follows the path of the 19th century Staunton and Parkersburg Turnpike. From Staunton east to Richmond, the highway serves as the local complement to Interstate 64 (I-64), roughly following the 18th century Three Notch'd Road through Waynesboro and Charlottesville on its way through the Shenandoah Valley, its crossing of the Blue Ridge Mountains at Rockfish Gap, and the Piedmont. In the Richmond metropolitan area, US 250 is known as Broad Street, a major thoroughfare through the city's West End and downtown areas.

== Route description ==
=== West Virginia to Staunton ===
US 250 enters Virginia on top of Allegheny Mountain, the ridgeline that forms the Virginia – West Virginia state line and the Eastern Continental Divide. The highway continues northwest into Pocahontas County, West Virginia toward Durbin and Elkins. US 250, which is known as Highland Turnpike, parallels the state line, then veers east and has a curvaceous descent along the east side of the mountain to the narrow valley of Back Creek. The highway climbs over Lantz Mountain before reaching Hightown in the Bluegrass Valley, which contains the headwaters of both the South Branch Potomac River on the north and the Jackson River, one of two chief tributaries of the James River, on the south. East of Hightown, US 250 crosses Monterey Mountain and enters the town of Monterey, the county seat of Highland County. The highway serves as the town's Main Street and intersects US 220 (Jackson River Road).

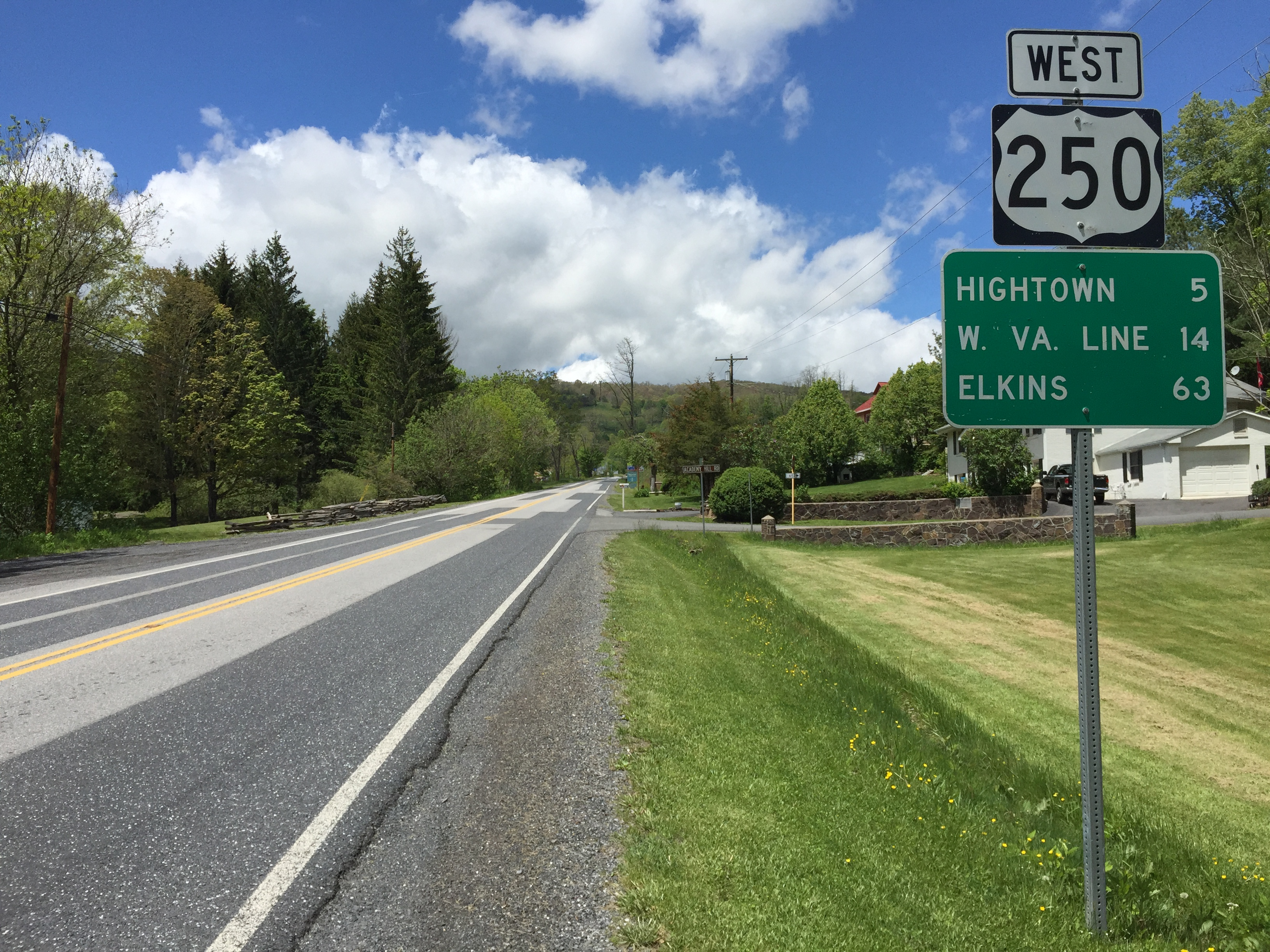
US 250 westbound in Highland County

US 250 passes to the north of Jack Mountain and follows Crab Creek through a gap in Doe Hill to McDowell, where the highway crosses the Bullpasture River. The highway continues across Bullpasture Mountain and crosses the Calfpasture River, the other chief tributary of the James River. After passing through Shaws Ridge, US 250 goes through the hamlet of Head Waters and has a curvaceous crossing of Shenandoah Mountain, where the highway enters Augusta County. At the Augusta County border, a parking area leads to Fort Edward Johnson, which was a series of fortifications built by the Confederate Army in 1862. The highway continues as Hankey Mountain Highway, which heads southeast to West Augusta in the valley of the Calfpasture River and continues east along Jennings Branch through Jennings Gap in Little North Mountain to enter the Shenandoah Valley. US 250 heads southeast along the creek through Lone Fountain and Churchville, Virginia. In the latter village, the highway runs concurrently with Virginia State Route 42 (SR 42), which heads north as Scenic Highway and south as Buffalo Gap Highway.

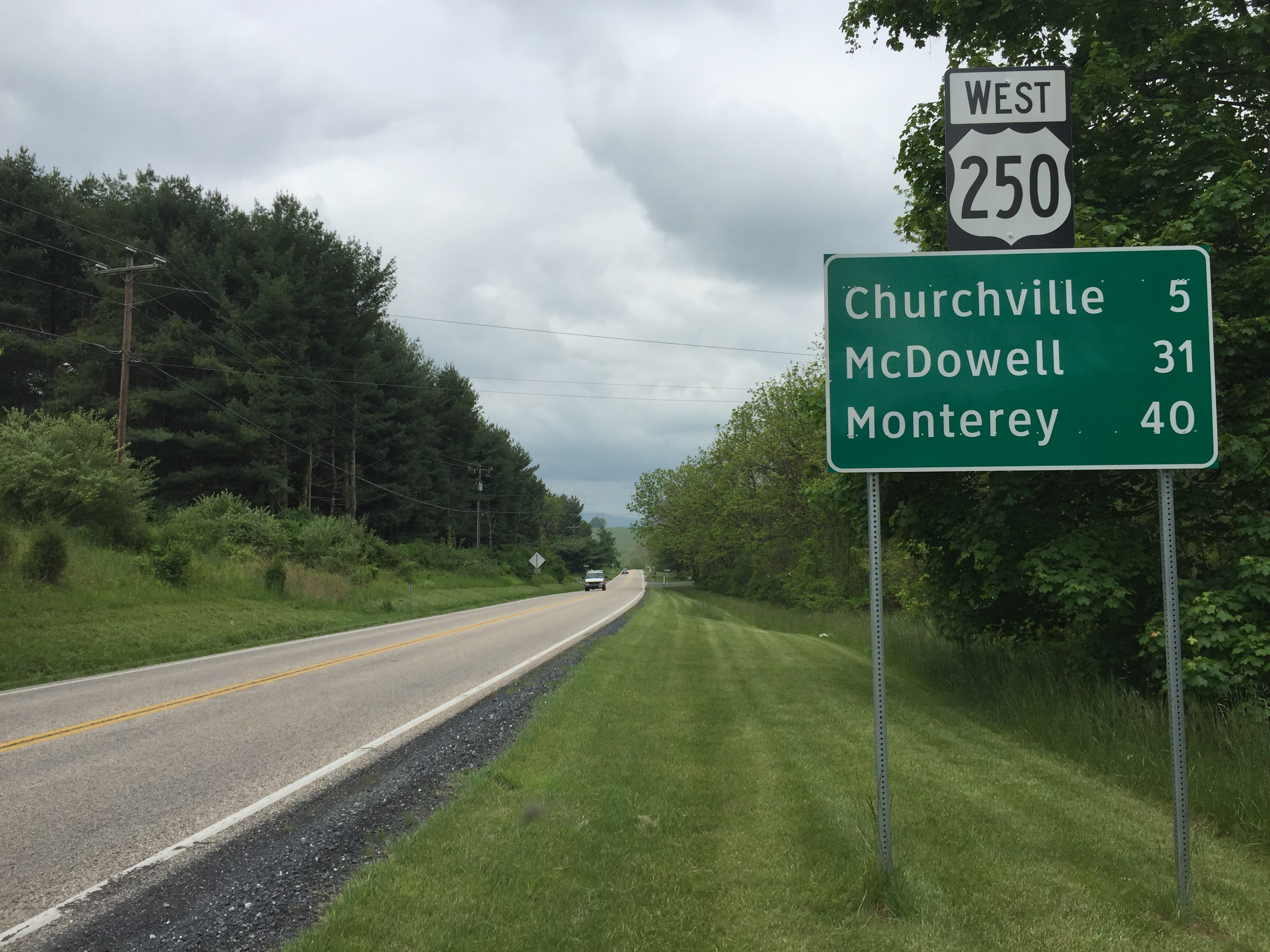
View west along US 250 between Staunton and Churchville

US 250 continues southeast as Churchville Avenue, which crosses the Middle River on its way to the independent city of Staunton. The highway meets SR 262 (Woodrow Wilson Parkway) at a diamond interchange at the west city limits and heads southeast toward the downtown area. At the north end of downtown, US 250 turns onto Augusta Street, where the highway runs concurrently with US 11 Business. The highways pass to the west of Mary Baldwin College and the Woodrow Wilson Presidential Library and intersect SRs 252 and 254, which both follow Frederick Street westbound and Beverley Street eastbound. At the south end of downtown, just north of the Staunton Amtrak station, US 250 and US 11 Business turn east onto Johnson Street, which parallels CSX's North Mountain Subdivision. US 11 Business's southern terminus is at US 250's intersection with US 11 and SR 254. SR 254 heads north on Coalter Street and east with northbound US 11 on Commerce Road while US 250 and US 11 pass under the railroad together on Greenville Avenue. South of the rail crossing, US 250 turns east onto Richmond Avenue.

=== Staunton to Charlottesville ===
US 250 heads east as a four-lane undivided highway through the southeastern part of Staunton, passing the remains of Western State Hospital and intersecting SR 261 (Statler Boulevard). The highway passes Staunton National Cemetery before expanding to a divided highway, crossing over the North Mountain rail line, and meeting I-81 at a partial cloverleaf interchange just after re-entering Augusta County. US 250 continues as Jefferson Highway, which becomes an undivided highway and passes under the rail line again just before its intersection with SR 285 (Tinkling Spring Road) in Fishersville. The highway becomes Main Street on entering the independent city of Waynesboro. At the west end of the Waynesboro Downtown Historic District, US 250 intersects US 340 (Rosser Avenue); US 340 continues east on Main Street while US 250 turns onto Broad Street, which parallels Main Street one block north and intersects SR 254 (Poplar Avenue). The highway crosses the South River into the Basic City neighborhood of Waynesboro before joining US 340 on Main Street. The two highways pass under Norfolk Southern Railway's Roanoke District and diverge at Delphine Street, where US 340 heads north toward Elkton.

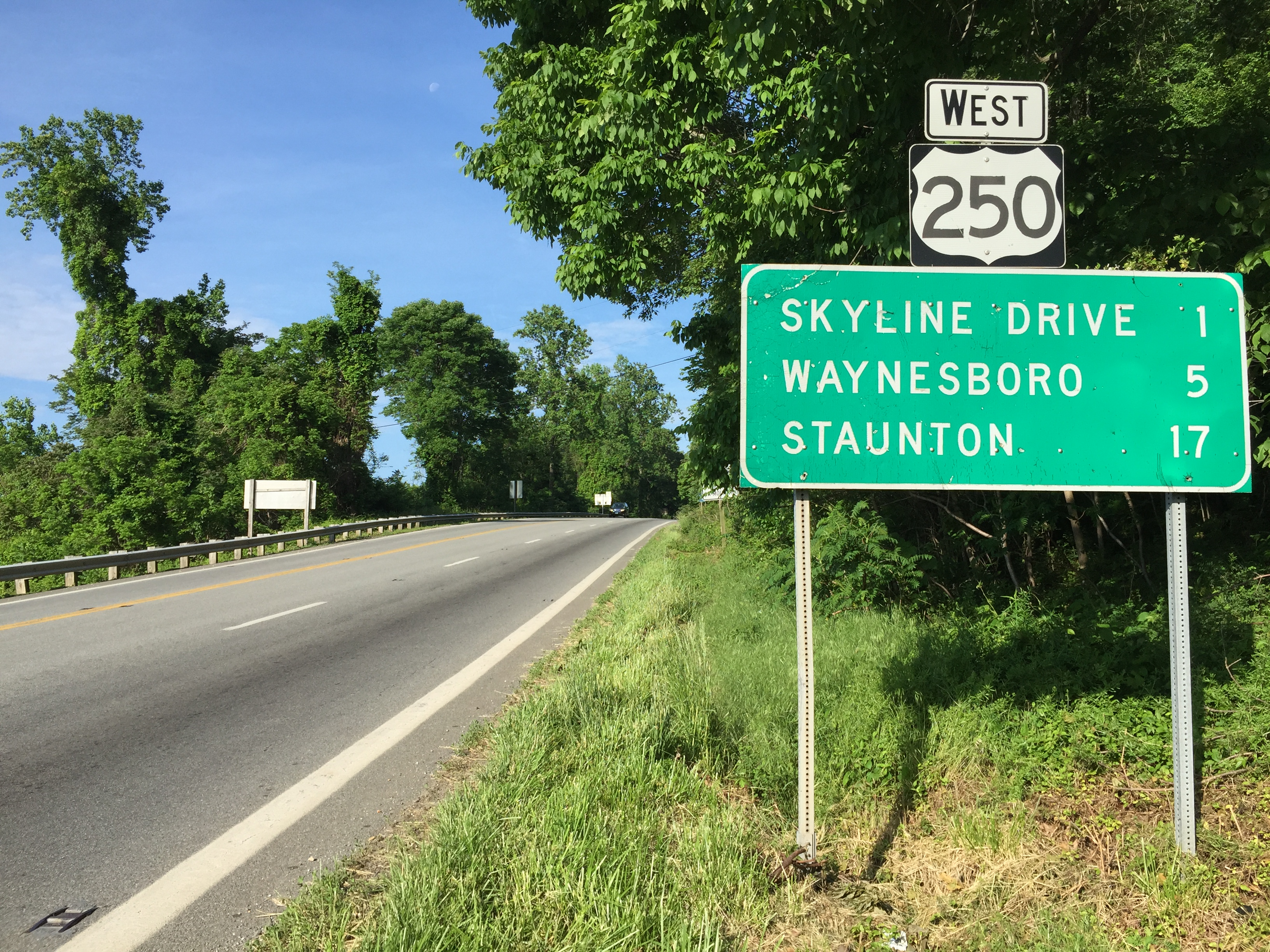
US 250 westbound past SR 6 in Afton

US 250 reduces to two lanes and parallels CSX's North Mountain Subdivision on its ascent of Blue Ridge Mountain. Just east of the city limit of Waynesboro, the highway passes under the rail line. Just west of Rockfish Gap, US 250 has a trumpet interchange with I-64, then curves east to the gap itself on the Augusta–Nelson county line. There, the highway has an interchange with the southern end of Skyline Drive, the primary highway through Shenandoah National Park, and the northern terminus of Blue Ridge Parkway. The highway descends the Blue Ridge as Rockfish Gap Turnpike, which runs parallel to I-64 and meets the western terminus of SR 6 (Afton Mountain Road) at Afton before entering Albemarle County. US 250 veers away from I-64, passes under the CSX rail line, and has a junction with the northern end of SR 151 (Critzers Shop Road) at the bottom of the descent. The highway temporarily expands to a four-lane divided highway for its diamond interchange with I-64 at Yancey Mills. In Brownsville, US 250 has an intersection with the western end of SR 240 (Crozet Avenue). The two highways meet again west of Ivy just north of another underpass of the railroad; SR 240 heads west toward Crozet as Three Notch'd Road.

US 250 continues east as Ivy Road, which crosses the Mechums River and passes under the railroad again in the namesake community. The highway parallels the railroad to just west of Charlottesville, where US 250 meets US 29 (Monacan Trail Road) at a partial cloverleaf interchange. US 250 Business continues east along Ivy Road through the University of Virginia campus while US 250 joins US 29 northward on the freeway bypass. The two highways have a partial interchange with Old Ivy Road, a northbound right-in/right-out interchange with Leonard Sandridge Road, which serves the university, and a diamond interchange with Barracks Road at the western city limit of Charlottesville. US 250 and US 29 diverge at a partial cloverleaf interchange with Emmet Street, which heads south as US 29 Business. East of US 29, US 250 becomes an expressway that features a combination diamond and right-in/right-out interchange with Dairy Road and Meadowbrook Heights Road, and a partial cloverleaf interchange with the eastern end of Rugby Road at the highway's crossing of Norfolk Southern's Washington District. The highway also has diamond interchanges with McIntire Road/John W. Warner Parkway, Park Street and Locust Avenue, east of which the highway continues as Long Street.

=== Charlottesville to Richmond ===
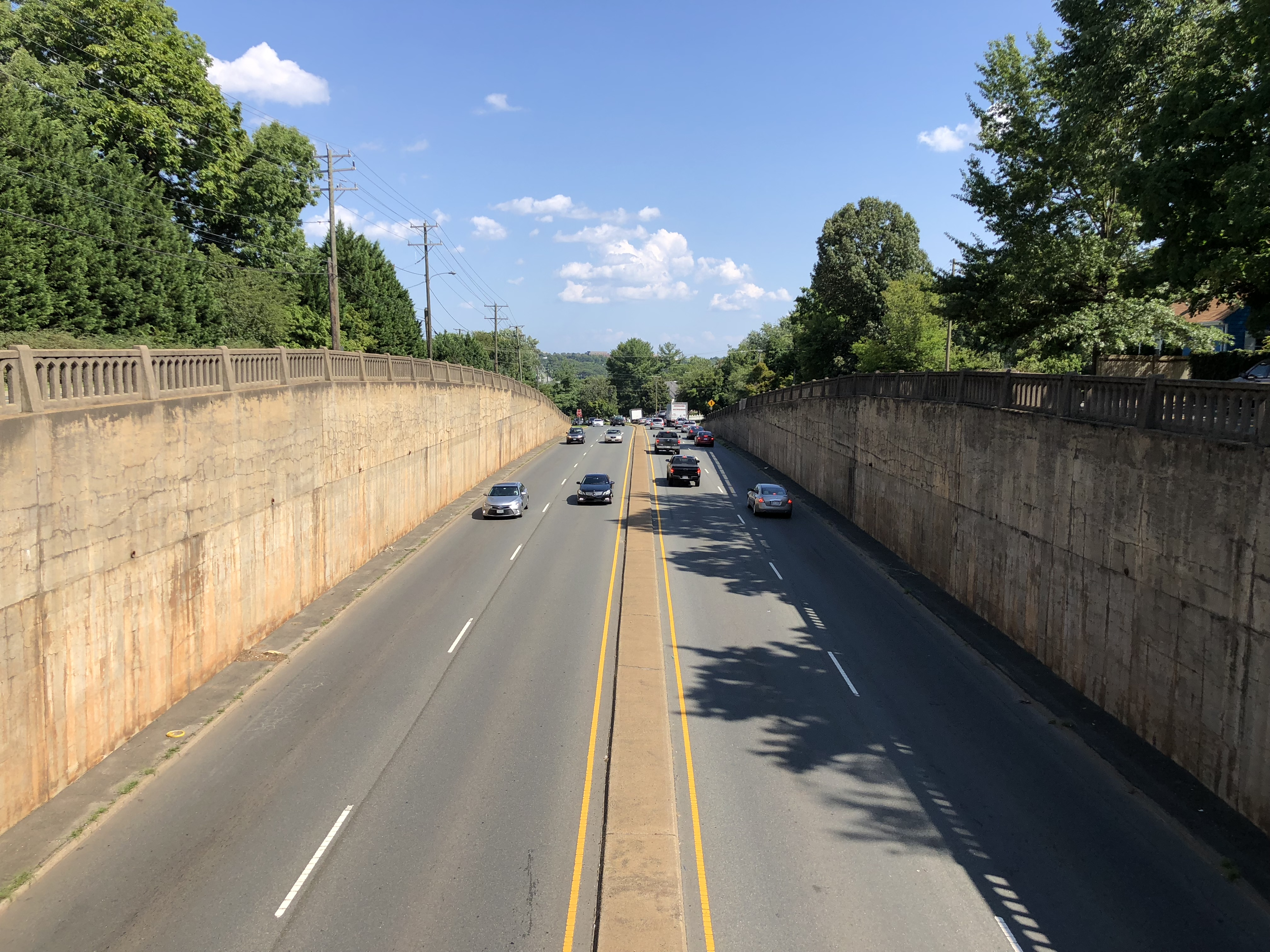
US 250 eastbound in Charlottesville

US 250 meets the eastern end of US 250 Business and SR 20 (High Street) just before crossing the Rivanna River on the Free Bridge to re-enter Albemarle County. East of the river, SR 20 heads north as Stony Point Road and the highway, now named Richmond Road, passes through the suburban community of Pantops before another diamond interchange with I-64. US 250 continues as a two-lane road through Shadwell, the birthplace of Thomas Jefferson, where the highway intersects SR 22 (Louisa Road) and crosses over CSX's Piedmont Subdivision. The highway passes through far northern Fluvanna County before entering Louisa County at the highway's intersection with US 15 (James Madison Highway) at Zion Crossroads. US 250 continues as Three Notch Road through Ferncliff, where the highway meets the southern end of SR 208 (Courthouse Road). The highway briefly passes through the northeastern corner of Fluvanna County and enters Goochland County as Broad Street Road. US 250 re-enters Louisa County for an intersection with US 522 (Cross County Road) at Gum Spring, then re-enters Goochland County.

US 250 passes through the hamlet of Oilville before entering a suburban area at the eastern edge of Goochland County. The highway expands to a six-lane divided highway a short distance west of its partial cloverleaf interchange with the SR 288 freeway and enters Henrico County as Broad Street. US 250 passes through the suburban community of Short Pump, which is home of Short Pump Town Center, an open-air shopping mall. The highway intersects SR 271 (Pouncey Tract Road) and has a partial cloverleaf interchange with I-64. Within the dense suburban area, US 250 has junctions with Cox Road, Gaskins Road, SR 157 (Pemberton Road/Springfield Road), Parham Road, and Hungary Spring Road. In Dumbarton, the highway has a partial interchange with I-64; the missing movements are completed via I-64's interchange with Glenside Drive next to the Reynolds Metals Company International Headquarters complex.

US 250 enters the city of Richmond adjacent to The Shops at Willow Lawn, where the GRTC Pulse bus rapid transit line begins following the road from its terminus at the Willow Lawn station. Soon after entering Richmond, the road comes to an intersection with US 33 (Staples Mill Road), where US 33 joins US 250 on Broad Street. The two highways parallel the city line to SR 197 (Malvern Avenue), then pass over I-195 with no access. US 33 and US 250 intersect SR 161 (Boulevard) northwest of the Science Museum of Virginia, in the former Broad Street railroad station. US 33 and US 250 split just east of the Siegel Center, home of the Virginia Commonwealth University Rams basketball teams, with US 250 continuing on Broad Street, while US 33 turns north onto Hancock Street. The highway intersects US 1 and US 301 at Belvidere Street, then passes through Downtown Richmond, including such buildings as the Masonic Temple, Carpenter Theater, the Library of Virginia, and the Old City Hall, which is one block north of the Virginia State Capitol and the Executive Mansion. US 250 passes by the headquarters of the Virginia Department of Transportation at its trumpet interchange with I-95 (Richmond–Petersburg Turnpike) at 14th Street. The GRTC Pulse line splits from Broad Street to follow 14th Street south. The highway passes to the north of Richmond's historic Main Street Station, then reaches its eastern terminus at US 360, which heads south along 17th Street and north on 18th Street. Broad Street continues east as an unnumbered city street through the city's Church Hill neighborhood.

== Major intersections ==
County	Location	mi	km	Destinations	Notes
Highland		0.00	0.00	US 250 north – Elkins	West Virginia state line
Highland	Monterey	13.76	22.14	US 220 (Potomac River Road / Jackson River Road) – Franklin, Warm Springs	
Highland	McDowell			SR 654 (Doe Hill Road) – Doe Hill	former SR 269 north
Highland	McDowell			SR 678 (Bullpasture River Road) – Williamsville	former SR 269 south
Augusta	West Augusta			SR 629 (Deerfield Valley Road) – Deerfield	former SR 272 south
Augusta	Whites Store			SR 728 (Stover Shop Road)	former SR 278 east
Augusta	Churchville	48.97	78.81	SR 42 north (Scenic Highway) – Harrisonburg	Western end of SR 42 concurrency
Augusta	Churchville	49.44	79.57	SR 42 south (Buffalo Gap Highway) – Clifton Forge, The Homestead	Eastern end of SR 42 concurrency
Augusta				SR 612 (Frog Pond Road)	former SR 56 east
City of Staunton		54.41	87.56	SR 262 / US 250 Truck east to I-81 / US 11	Interchange
City of Staunton		56.91	91.59	US 11 Bus. north (North Augusta Street)	Western end of US 11 Bus. concurrency
City of Staunton		57.29	92.20	SR 254 west (West Frederick Street)	West end of SR 254 east overlap (eastbound only)
City of Staunton				To SR 254 / West Johnson Street	
City of Staunton		57.67	92.81	US 11 north / SR 254 (Commerce Road / South Coalter Street)	Eastern end of US 11 Bus. concurrency; east end of SR 254 east overlap (eastbound only); western end of US 11 concurrency
City of Staunton		57.74	92.92	US 11 south (Greenville Avenue)	Eastern end of US 11 concurrency
City of Staunton		58.49	94.13	US 11 Truck / US 250 Truck west (Statler Boulevard / SR 261)	
Augusta	Peyton	59.96	96.50	I-81 to I-64 – Winchester, Roanoke, Waynesboro	Exit 222 (I-81)
Augusta	Fishersville			SR 608 (Long Meadow Road) – New Hope	West end of SR 608 overlap
Augusta	Fishersville	64.48	103.77	SR 285 south / SR 608 (Tinkling Spring Road) / SR 805 (Station House Road) to I-64 – Stuarts Draft, Expoland	East end of SR 608 overlap; former SR 273 south
City of Waynesboro		68.46	110.18	US 340 (Rosser Avenue / Main Street) / US 340 Truck north (Broad Street) to I-64 – Historic Downtown	Western end of US 340 Truck concurrency
City of Waynesboro		68.71	110.58	SR 254 (Poplar Avenue)	
City of Waynesboro		69.77	112.28	US 340 south (Main Street) / US 340 Truck south (Broad Street) – Historic Downtown	Eastern end of US 340 Truck concurrency; western end of US 340 concurrency
City of Waynesboro		69.96	112.59	US 340 north (Delphine Avenue) to I-64 – Elkton	Eastern end of US 340 concurrency
Augusta	Rockfish Gap	73.16	117.74	I-64 – Staunton, Charlottesville	Exit 99 (I-64)
Augusta	Rockfish Gap	73.99	119.08	SR 610 (Howardsville Turnpike) / Blue Ridge Parkway south / Skyline Drive north – Shenandoah National Park, Swannanoa	Northern terminus of Blue Ridge Parkway and southern terminus of Skyline Drive; interchange
Nelson		74.66	120.15	SR 6 east (Afton Mountain Road) – Afton	Western terminus of SR 6
Albemarle				SR 151 south (Critzers Shop Road) – Lynchburg, Wintergreen, Wintergreen Resort, truck route to SR 6	Northern terminus of SR 151
Albemarle				SR 690 (Greenwood Road / Ortman Road)	
Albemarle				SR 691 (Greenwood Station Road) – Greenwood	Southern terminus of SR 691
Albemarle	Yancey Mills	81.12	130.55	I-64 – Staunton, Richmond	Exit 107 (I-64)
Albemarle	Brownsville	82.81	133.27	SR 240 east (Crozet Avenue) / SR 635 (Miller School Road) – Crozet	Western terminus of SR 240
Albemarle	Mechums River	85.78	138.05	SR 240 west (Three Notch'd Road) / SR 680 (Browns Gap Turnpike) – Crozet	Eastern terminus of SR 240
Albemarle		92.87	149.46	US 29 south / US 250 Bus. east (Ivy Road) to I-64 – Charlottesville, Richmond, Staunton, Lynchburg, Monticello, Ash Lawn, Michie Tavern	Interchange; western end of US 29 concurrency
Albemarle				To SR 601	Interchange; westbound exit and eastbound entrance
Albemarle				Leonard Sandridge Road – University of Virginia	Eastbound access only
Albemarle		94.73	152.45	SR 654 (Barracks Road)	Interchange
City of Charlottesville		95.08	153.02	US 29 north / US 29 Bus. south (Emmet Street) – Charlottesville Albemarle Airport, Culpeper, Washington	Interchange; eastern end of US 29 concurrency
City of Charlottesville		95.52	153.72	Hydraulic Road to US 29 north	
City of Charlottesville		95.82	154.21	Dairy Road / Meadowbrook Heights Road	Interchange
City of Charlottesville		96.42	155.17	Rugby Avenue - McIntire Park	Interchange
City of Charlottesville		96.80	155.78	McIntire Road / John W. Warner Parkway / Hillcrest Road / Birdwood Road	Interchange; eastbound access only for Hillcrest, Birdwood Roads
City of Charlottesville		97.02	156.14	Park Street to SR 631 north	Interchange
City of Charlottesville		97.34	156.65	Locust Avenue / St. Charles Avenue / St. Clair Avenue	Interchange; St. Charles Avenue only on western signage; St. Clair Avenue only on eastern signage
City of Charlottesville		97.77	157.35	US 250 Bus. west / SR 20 south (High Street)	Western end of SR 20 concurrency
Albemarle	Pantops	98.03	157.76	SR 20 north (Stony Point Road) / SR 1116 (River Bend Drive) – Barboursville, Darden Towe Park	Eastern end of SR 20 concurrency
Albemarle		99.67	160.40	I-64 – Richmond, Staunton, Monticello, Ash Lawn, Michie Tavern	Exit 124 (I-64)
Albemarle	Shadwell	101.83	163.88	SR 22 east (Louisa Road) – Cismont, Boswells Tavern, Keswick	Western terminus of SR 22
Albemarle		105.40	169.62	SR 616 (Union Mills Road) to I-64	
Fluvanna	No major junctions				
Louisa	Zion Crossroads	112.23	180.62	US 15 (James Madison Highway) to I-64 – Gordonsville, Farmville	
Louisa	Ferncliff	118.76	191.13	SR 208 east (Courthouse Road) / SR 659 (Kents Store Road) to I-64 – Louisa, Kents Store, Columbia	former SR 27
Fluvanna	No major junctions				
Goochland	Shannon Hill			SR 605 (Shannon Hill Road) to I-64	former SR 162 south
Goochland				SR 629 (Old Fredericksburg Road) to I-64 / SR 606	
Louisa	Gum Spring	134.88	217.07	US 522 (Cross County Road) to I-64 – Culpeper, Goochland	
Goochland	Oilville			SR 617 (Oilville Road) to I-64 – Rockville, Montpelier	
Goochland	Oilville			SR 670 (Cardwell Road) – Crozier	former SR 159 south
Goochland				SR 623 (Ashland Road) to I-64 / I-295 – Ashland	
Goochland		150.75	242.61	SR 288 to I-64 – Richmond, Charlottesville, Chesterfield	Interchange
Henrico	Short Pump	153.17	246.50	SR 271 north (Pouncey Tract Road) / Pump Road – Short Pump Town Center	Southern terminus of SR 271
Henrico	Short Pump	154.01	247.86	I-64 to I-295 – Charlottesville, Richmond	Exit 178 (I-64)
Henrico				Gaskins Road to I-64	
Henrico		156.07	251.17	SR 157 (Springfield Road / Pemberton Road)	
Henrico	Dumbarton	159.21	256.22	I-64 to I-95 / Glenside Drive – Richmond, Charlottesville	Exit 183 (I-64); access from US 250 E to I-64 W via Glenside Drive
City of Richmond		161.77	260.34	US 33 west (Staples Mill Road) – Harrisonburg	Western end of US 33 concurrency
City of Richmond		162.56	261.61	SR 197 (Westwood Avenue / Malvern Avenue) to I-95	
City of Richmond				Hamilton Street to I-64 / I-95 / I-195 / SR 195	
City of Richmond		163.62	263.32	SR 161 (North Arthur Ashe Boulevard)	No direct access from US 250 E to SR 161 N
City of Richmond		164.93	265.43	US 33 ends / SR 33 begins (Harrison Street / Hancock Street)	Eastern end of US 33 concurrency; eastern terminus of US 33 and western terminus of SR 33
City of Richmond		165.17	265.82	US 1 / US 301 (North Belvidere Street) to I-64 / I-95 / SR 33 east	
City of Richmond		166.45	267.88	I-95 to I-64 – Washington, Petersburg	Exit 74C (I-95)
City of Richmond		166.68	268.25	US 360 west (North 17th Street)	
City of Richmond		166.74	268.34	US 360 east (North 18th Street) / East Broad Street	Eastern terminus
1.000 mi = 1.609 km; 1.000 km = 0.621 mi: Concurrency terminus; Incomplete access

== Bannered route ==
=== Staunton truck route ===
U.S. Route 250 Truck
- Location: Staunton

=== Charlottesville business route ===
U.S. Route 250 Business
- Location: Charlottesville
- Length: 4.55 mi (7.32 km)

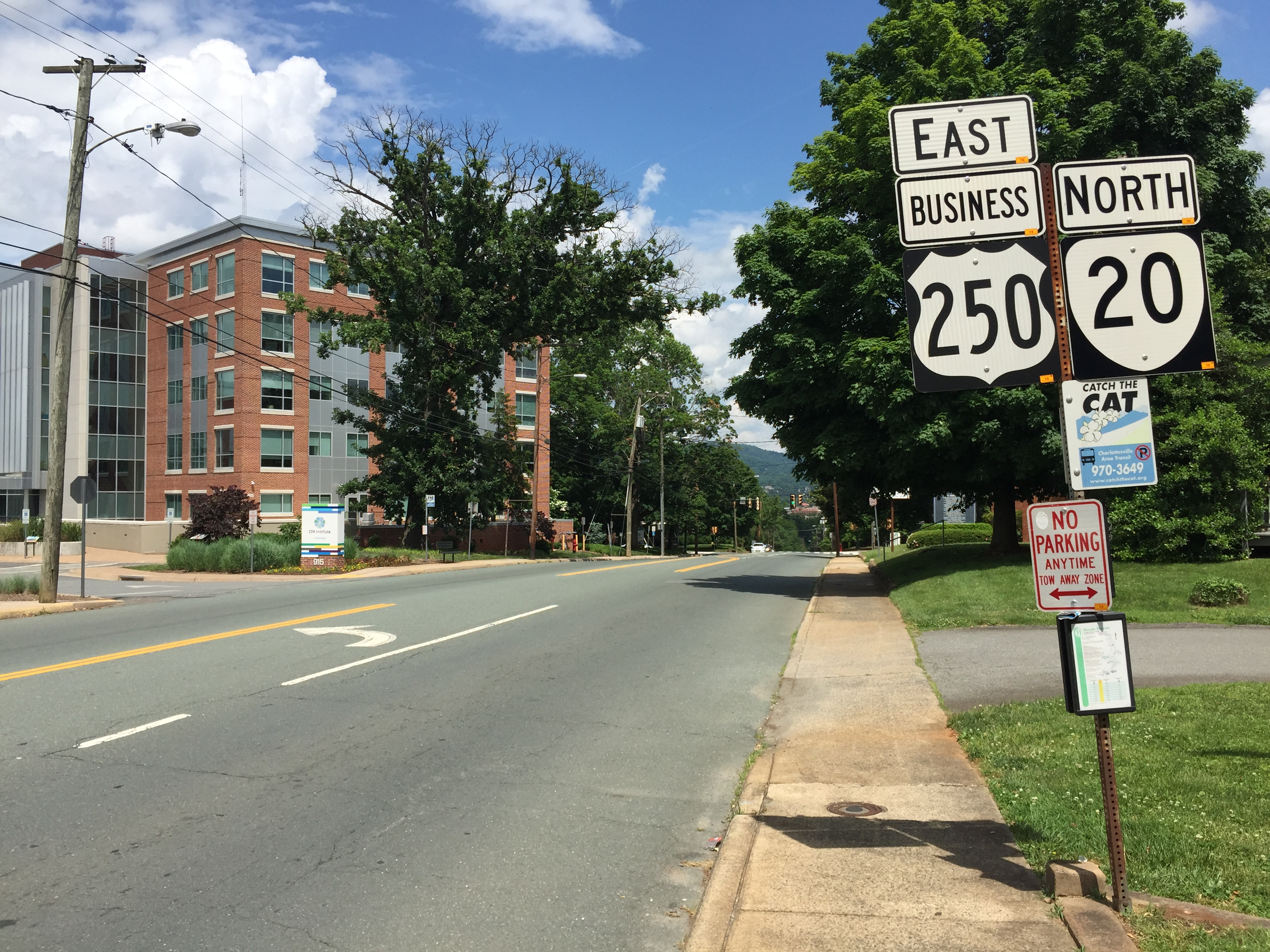
View east along US 250 Bus. and north along SR 20 in Charlottesville

US Route 250 Business (US 250 Business) is a business route of US 250 in Albemarle County and the city of Charlottesville. The highway runs 4.55 miles (7.32 km) from US 250 and US 29 west of Charlottesville to US 250 and SR 20 in the eastern part of Charlottesville. US 250 Business begins at the partial cloverleaf interchange where US 250 joins US 29 (Monacan Trail Road) on its bypass of Charlottesville. The business route heads east as Ivy Road, which parallels CSX's North Mountain Subdivision, to Old Ivy Road, where the highway veers away from the rail line and enters the city of Charlottesville. US 250 Business passes to the south of the University of Virginia sports complex, which includes Davenport Field, Klockner Stadium, and John Paul Jones Arena. At its intersection with US 29 Business (Emmet Street), the business route enters the University of Virginia grounds. US 250 Business's name changes to University Avenue, which passes to the north of The Lawn, The Rotunda, and the University of Virginia Health System.

At The Corner, US 250 Business leaves the university grounds and veers onto Main Street, which passes under the CSX rail line. The business route passes Charlottesville Union Station at its crossing of Norfolk Southern Railway's Washington District. At the west end of the city's Downtown Mall, US 250 Business turns north onto four-lane divided Ridge/McIntire Road, then turns east and splits into a one-way pair; the eastbound business route follows Market Street while the westbound highway uses High Street. Eastbound US 250 Business, after passing to the north of the Downtown Mall, becomes concurrent with SR 20 when it turns onto 9th Street; the two directions reunite at the intersection of 9th Street and High Street, where US 250 Business and SR 20 continue northeast as High Street. The two highways pass the CFA Institute (originally Martha Jefferson Hospital) on their way to US 250 Business's eastern terminus at US 250 (Long Street) just west of the eastern city limit of Charlottesville at the Rivanna River.

U.S. Route 250
Previous state: West Virginia	Virginia	Next state: Terminus
