= West Augusta, Virginia =

Unincorporated community in Virginia, United States

- Unincorporated community
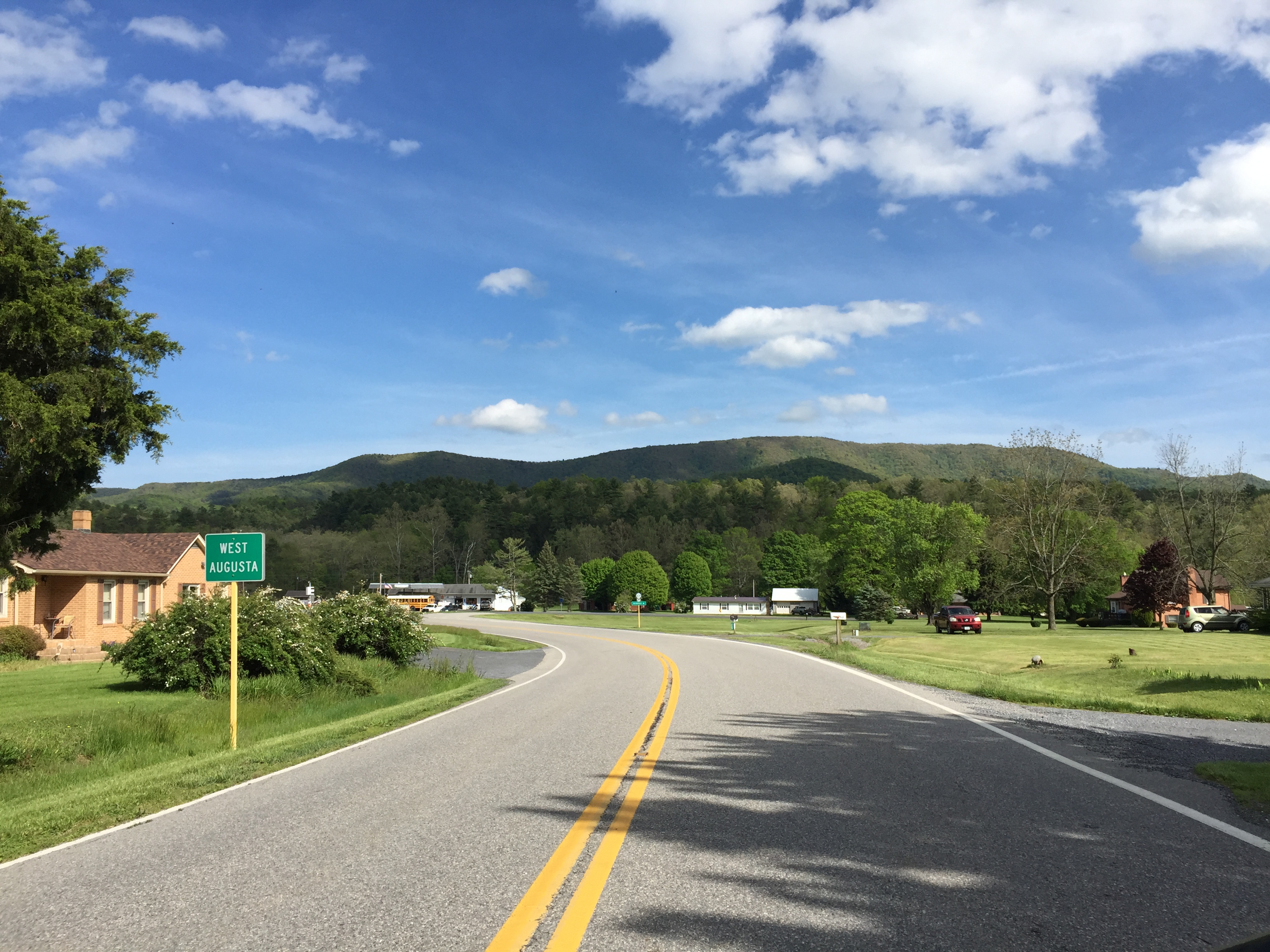
- View east along US 250 entering West Augusta

- Location within Virginia Location within the United States
- Coordinates: 38°16′12″N 79°18′28″W
- Country: United States
- State: Virginia
- County: Augusta
- Elevation: 1,890 ft (580 m)
- Time zone: UTC−5 (Eastern (EST))
  - Summer (DST): UTC−4 (EDT)
- ZIP code: 24485
- Area code: 540
- GNIS feature ID: 1500293

West Augusta is an unincorporated community in Augusta County, Virginia, United States. West Augusta is located at the intersection of U.S. Route 250 and Virginia State Route 629. The source of the Calfpasture River, which flows through West Augusta, is located near the community to the north.

== Climate ==
The climate in this area is characterized by hot, humid summers and generally mild to cool winters. According to the Köppen Climate Classification system, West Augusta has a humid subtropical climate, abbreviated "Cfa" on climate maps.
