= Virginia State Route 261 =

State highway in the City of Staunton, Virginia, US

State Route 261
- Statler Boulevard

Route information
- Maintained by VDOT
- Length: 2.21 mi (3.56 km)
- Existed: c. 1980–present

Major junctions
- South end: US 11 / US 11 Truck begin / SR 613 in Staunton
- US 250 / US 250 Truck begins in Staunton; SR 254 in Staunton; US 11 / US 11 Truck ends / US 250 Truck west in Staunton
- North end: North Coalter Street / Edgebrook Road in Staunton

Location
- Country: United States
- State: Virginia
- Counties: City of Staunton

Highway system
- Virginia Routes; Interstate; US; Primary; Secondary; Byways; History; HOT lanes
← SR 259	→ SR 262

State Route 261 (SR 261) is a primary state highway in the U.S. state of Virginia. Known as Statler Boulevard, the state highway runs 2.21 miles (3.56 km) from U.S. Route 11 (US 11) north to Coalter Street within the independent city of Staunton. SR 261 is an unsigned four-lane divided highway that provides an eastern truck bypass of downtown Staunton. The state highway is marked along much of its route as U.S. Route 11 Truck and US 250 Truck.

== Route description ==
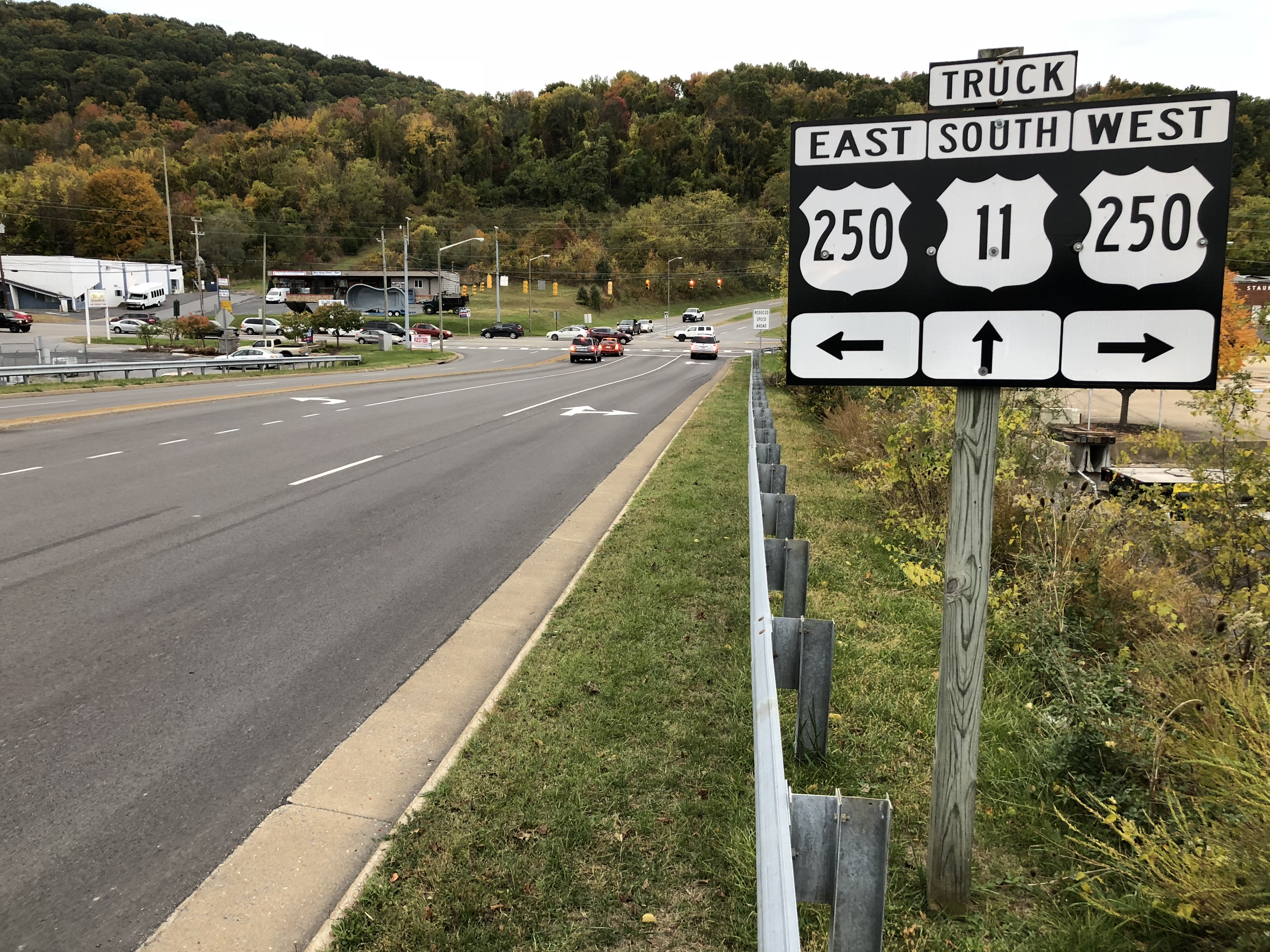
View south along SR 261 at US 250 in Staunton

SR 261 begins an intersection with US 11 (Greenville Avenue) and unnumbered Old Greenville Road southeast of downtown Staunton. This intersection is also the southern terminus of US 11 Truck. The four-lane divided highway intersects US 250 (Richmond Road), where the state highway also begins to run concurrently with US 250 Truck. SR 261 crosses over CSX's North Mountain Subdivision and curves west to intersect SR 254 (New Hope Road), the Chesapeake Western Railway, and US 11 (Commerce Road). At the US 11 intersection, US 11 Truck reaches its northern terminus and US 250 Truck turns north onto US 11. US 250 Truck follows US 11 and SR 262 north and west to reconnect with US 250 northwest of Staunton. SR 261 continues west to its northern terminus at the intersection of North Coalter Street and Edgewood Road northeast of downtown Staunton.

== Major intersections ==
The entire route is in Staunton.

mi	km	Destinations	Notes
0.00	0.00	US 11 (Greenville Avenue) / US 11 Truck begin / SR 613 (Old Greenville Road) to SR 262 – Staunton, Montgomery Hall Park, Lexington	Southern terminus; southern end of concurrency with US 11 Truck; northern terminus of SR 613
0.84	1.35	US 250 (Richmond Road) / US 250 Truck begin – Staunton, Frontier Culture Museum of Virginia, Waynesboro	Southern end of concurrency with US 250 Truck
1.62	2.61	SR 254 (New Hope Road) – Waynesboro	
1.76	2.83	US 11 / US 11 Truck end / US 250 Truck west (Commerce Road) – Staunton, Harrisonburg	Northern end of concurrency with US 11 Truck / US 250 Truck; northern terminus of US 11 Truck
2.21	3.56	North Coalter Street / Edgewood Road	Northern terminus; road continues as Edgewood Road
1.000 mi = 1.609 km; 1.000 km = 0.621 mi: Concurrency terminus
