= U.S. Route 11 in Virginia =

Highway in Virginia

U.S. Route 11
- US 11 highlighted in red

Route information
- Maintained by VDOT
- Length: 339.41 mi (546.23 km)
- Existed: 1926–present
- Tourist routes: Virginia Byway

Major junctions
- South end: US 11E / US 11W / US 19 / US 421 / SR 381 in Bristol
- I-81 in numerous locations; US 58 in Abingdon; I-77 / US 21 / US 52 in Wytheville; US 460 in Salem; Future I-73 / I-581 / US 220 / US 221 in Roanoke; I-64 / US 60 in Lexington; US 250 in Staunton; US 33 in Harrisonburg; US 211 in New Market; US 17 / US 50 / US 522 in Winchester
- North end: US 11 at Rest

Location
- Country: United States
- State: Virginia
- Counties: City of Bristol, Washington, Smyth, Wythe, Pulaski, City of Radford, Montgomery, Roanoke, City of Salem, City of Roanoke, Botetourt, Rockbridge, City of Lexington, Augusta, City of Staunton, Rockingham, City of Harrisonburg, Shenandoah, Warren, Frederick, City of Winchester

Highway system
- United States Numbered Highway System; List; Special; Divided; Virginia Routes; Interstate; US; Primary; Secondary; Byways; History; HOT lanes
| ← SR 10 | → US 11E |

U.S. Route 11 (US 11) is a north–south United States Numbered Highway in western Virginia. At 339 miles (546 km), it is the second longest numbered route (after US 58) and longest primarily north–south route in the state. It enters the state from Tennessee as the divided routes US 11E and US 11W at Bristol, roughly follows the West Virginia border through the Blue Ridge Mountains and Shenandoah Valley, and enters the Eastern Panhandle of West Virginia from Frederick County. Most of the route closely parallels I-81. From south to north, US 11 serves the cities and towns of Bristol, Abingdon, Wytheville, Pulaski, Radford, Christiansburg, Roanoke, Lexington, Staunton, Harrisonburg, Strasburg, and Winchester. As one of the original U.S. Highways, it was first designated through Virginia in 1926 and has largely followed the same route since. Prior to the construction of the Interstate Highway System, it was the primary long-distance route for traversing the western part of the state. Much of it roughly follows the Great Wagon Road, a colonial-era road that followed the Appalachian Mountains from Georgia to Pennsylvania.

== Route description ==
Virginia's portion of US 11 begins at the four-way intersection of east–west Euclid Avenue and north–south Commonwealth Avenue in Bristol. At this intersection, a pair of divided U.S. Highways, US 11W and US 11E, merge to form mainline US 11. US 11W and US 11E parallel each other through East Tennessee to Knoxville, where the divided routes merge to form mainline US 11 again. The west leg of the intersection features southbound US 11W and northbound US 421. The U.S. Highways split at the Tennessee state line; US 11W heads southwest toward Kingsport, Tennessee, while US 421 soon joins US 58 west toward Gate City. The south leg of the intersection includes southbound US 11E, southbound US 19, southbound US 421, and southbound SR 381. At the Tennessee state line at State Street in downtown Bristol, SR 381 has its southern terminus, US 421 turns east toward Mountain City, Tennessee, and US 11E and US 19 continue south to Johnson City, Tennessee. The north leg of the intersection is SR 381, which is a state-numbered, street-level continuation of I-381, a spur south from I-81.

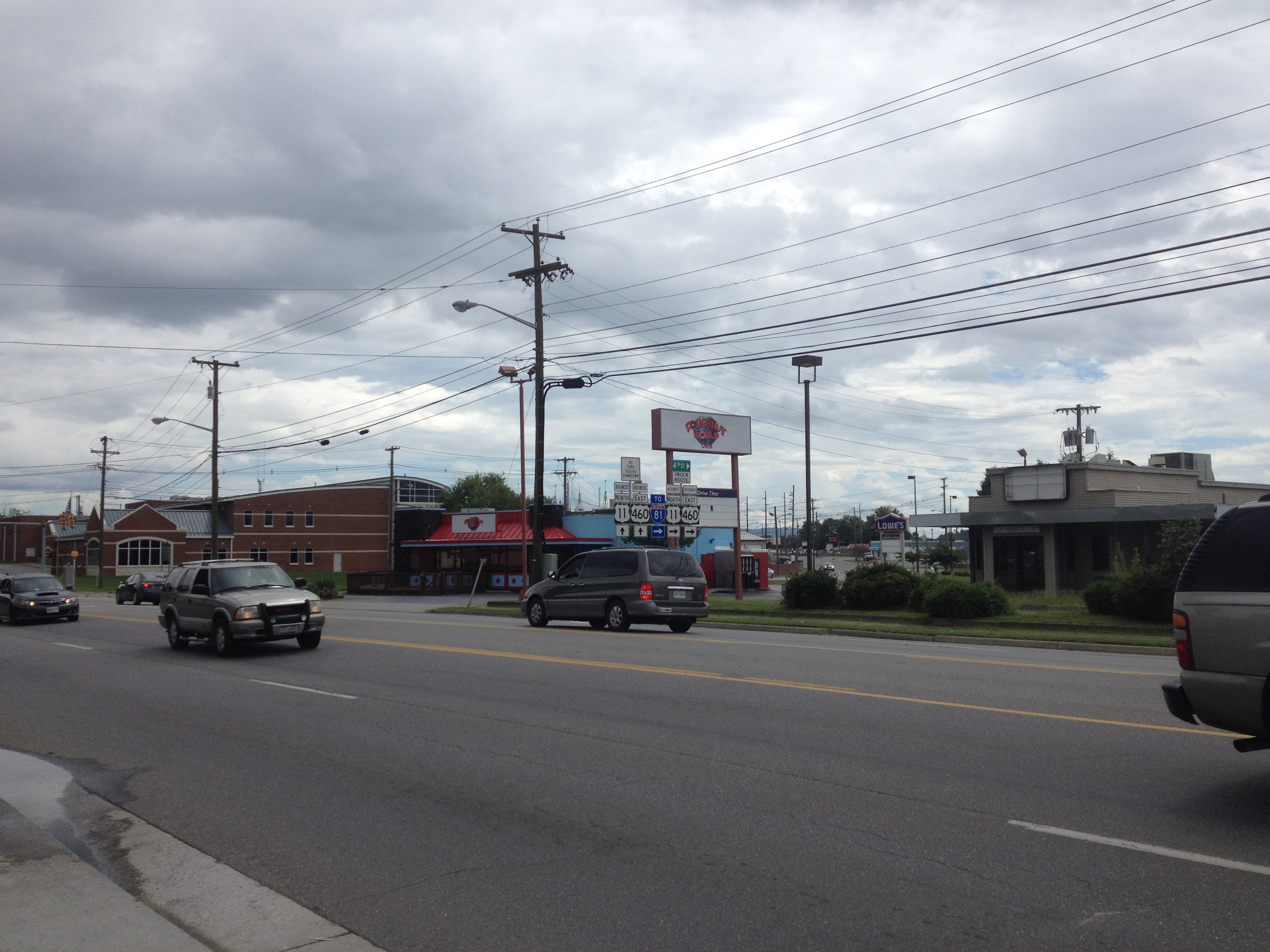
Northbound US 11/eastbound US 460 at the intersection with US 11 Alt./US 460 Alt. in Salem

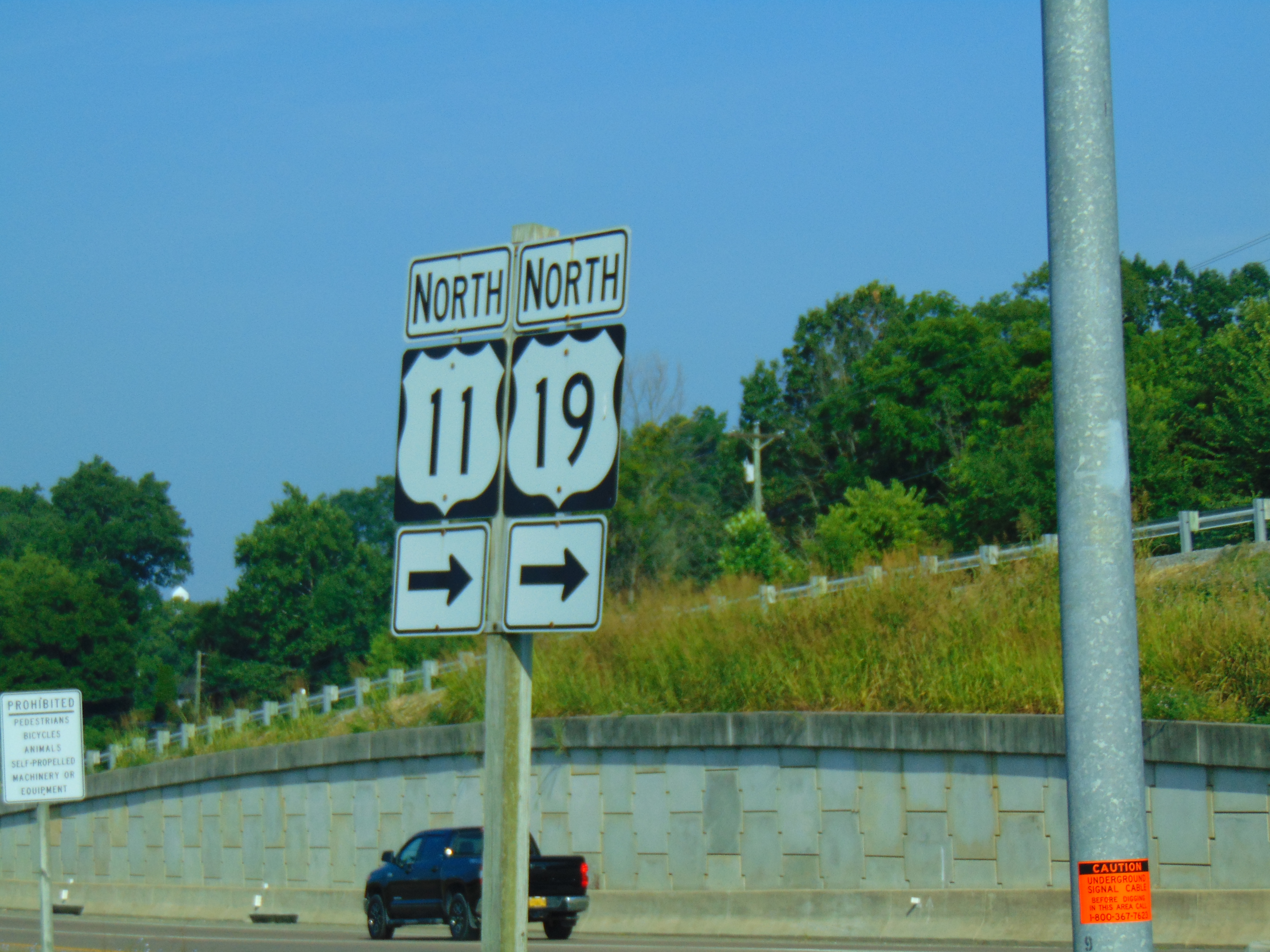
US 11/US 19 after intersecting I-81 in Bristol

US 11 and US 19 head east as a two-lane divided boulevard through a residential area. The street becomes undivided shortly before the U.S. Highways reach the northern end of SR 113 (Moore Street), which heads south toward Virginia Intermont College and downtown Bristol. US 11 and US 19 continue northeast on Lee Highway, which, here and in much of Virginia is a three-lane road with center turn lane. The highway meets I-81 and US 58 at a diamond interchange with a rakish angle. US 11 and US 19 pass under Norfolk Southern Railway's Pulaski District and cross Beaver Creek before leaving the city of Bristol. The two highways continue northeast through Washington County, where they pass Virginia Highlands Airport before entering the town of Abingdon. At the west end of town, US 11 and US 19 intersect SR 140 (Jonesboro Road), a connector between the U.S. Highways and I-81 that also serves Virginia Highlands Community College. The U.S. highways continue east as Main Street, which passes under the Norfolk Southern Railway line before US 19 turns north onto Porterfield Highway. US 11 becomes four lanes and then two at its intersection with US 58 Alternate (US 58 Alt.; Russell Street), which leads to the William King Museum of Art, in downtown Abingdon. The alternate route runs along Main Street for a short distance before turning south with SR 75 (Cummings Street) to rejoin US 58 at I-81. US 11 passes Barter Theatre. At the east end of town, US 11 crosses over the rail line and meets I-81 at a partial cloverleaf interchange. US 11 has a short concurrency with US 58 east of the interchange before US 58 splits to the east as Jeb Stuart Highway.

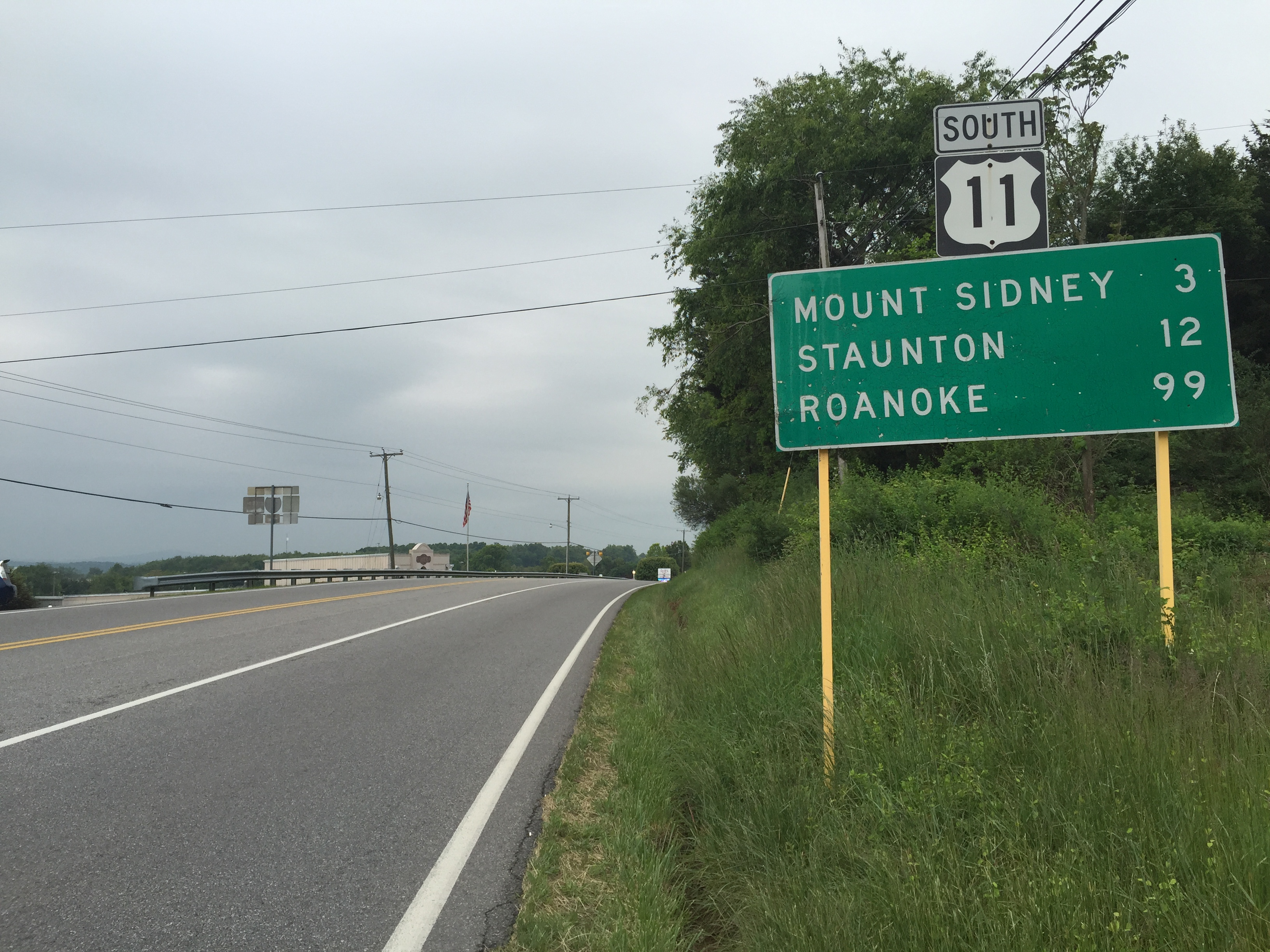
View south along US 11 near SR 256 in Weyers Cave, Augusta County

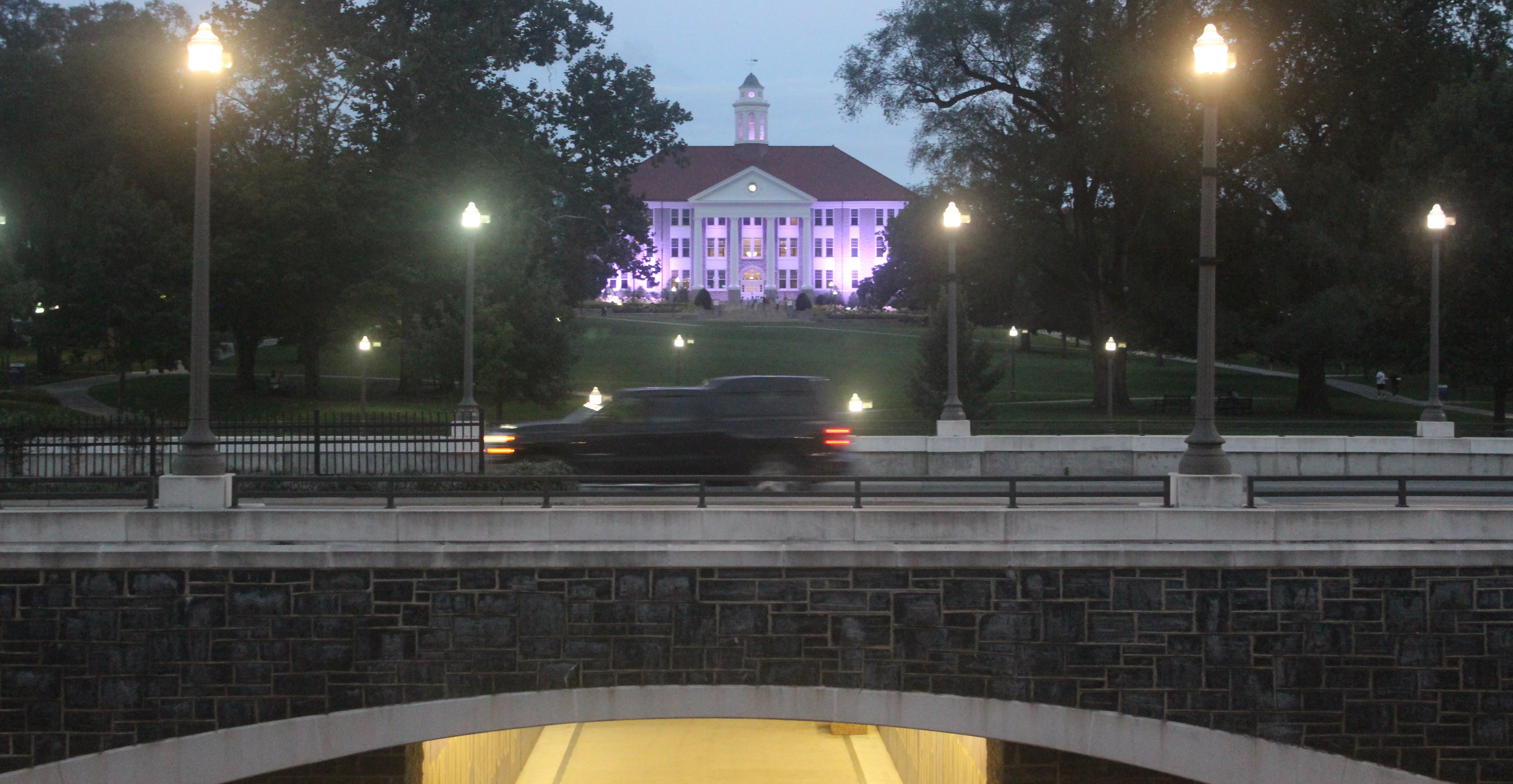
US 11 inside the James Madison University campus in Harrisonburg. Woodrow Wilson Hall can be seen in the background.

US 11 meets the southern end of SR 80 (Glenbrook Avenue) south of the communities of Meadowview and Emory; the latter village is the home of Emory and Henry College. The U.S. Highway intersects SR 91 (Maple Street) south of Glade Spring before the highway closely parallels I-81. US 11 has an interchange with I-81 where the highway crosses to the north side of the Interstate shortly before entering Smyth County.

== History ==
What is now US 11 was added to the state highway system in 1918 as portions of SR 10 (Bristol to Roanoke) and SR 3 (Roanoke to West Virginia). SR 3 became SR 33 in 1923, and US 11 was applied to its present alignment in 1926. SR 10 and SR 33 were dropped in 1933.

== Major intersections ==
| County | Location | mi | km | Destinations | Notes |
|---|---|---|---|---|---|
| City of Bristol | | 0.0 | 0.0 | US 11E south / US 19 south / US 421 south (Commonwealth Avenue / US 11 Truck north / SR 381) / US 11W south / US 421 south (Euclid Avenue) to I-81 | US 11 splits into US 11E and US 11W; south end of US 19 overlap |
| City of Bristol | | 1.0 | 1.6 | US 11 Truck south / US 19 Truck south (Moore Street / SR 113 south) | |
| City of Bristol | | 2.8 | 4.5 | I-81 / US 58 – Knoxville, Roanoke | I-81 exit 5 |
| City of Bristol | | | | Bonham Road | former SR 76 south |
| Washington | Abingdon | 12.5 | 20.1 | SR 140 south (Jonesboro Road) to I-81 / US 58 – Virginia Highlands Community College | |
| Washington | Abingdon | 13.4 | 21.6 | US 19 north (Porterfield Highway) – Hansonville, Bluefield | North end of concurrency with US 19 |
| Washington | Abingdon | 14.2 | 22.9 | US 58 Alt. west (Russell Road) to US 19 north | South end of concurrency with US 58 Alternate |
| Washington | Abingdon | 14.5 | 23.3 | US 58 Alt. east / SR 75 (Cummings Street) to I-81 | North end of concurrency with US 58 Alternate; no left turn northbound |
| Washington | | 17.1 | 27.5 | I-81 / US 58 west – Roanoke, Bristol | I-81 exit 19; south end of concurrency with US 58 |
| Washington | | 17.4 | 28.0 | US 58 east (J.E.B. Stuart Highway) – Damascus | North end of concurrency with US 58 |
| Washington | Cedarville | 22.1 | 35.6 | SR 80 west (Glenbrook Avenue) / SR 803 (Cedar Creek Road) to I-81 | |
| Washington | Old Glade Spring | 26.7 | 43.0 | SR 91 (Maple Street / Monroe Road) to I-81 – Glade Spring, Saltville, Damascus | |
| Washington | | 29.3 | 47.2 | I-81 – Bristol, Marion | I-81 exit 32 |
| Smyth | Chilhowie | 33.3 | 53.6 | SR 107 (White Top Road) to I-81 – Saltville | former SR 79 south |
| Smyth | Seven Mile Ford | 36.9 | 59.4 | I-81 – Marion, Abingdon | I-81 exit 39 |
| Smyth | | 41.3 | 66.5 | I-81 south – Abingdon | I-81 exit 44 |
| Smyth | Marion | 43.3 | 69.7 | SR 16 south (South Commerce Street) to I-81 | South end of concurrency with SR 16 |
| Smyth | Marion | 44.5 | 71.6 | SR 16 north (Park Boulevard) | North end of concurrency with SR 16 |
| Smyth | Mount Carmel | | | To Rifton Drive / I-81 – Wytheville, Bristol | I-81 exit 47 |
| Wythe | Rural Retreat (Staley Crossroads) | 58.2 | 93.7 | SR 90 (Black Lick Road / North Main Street) to I-81 – Rural Retreat | |
| Wythe | | 65.4 | 105.3 | I-81 south – Bristol | I-81 exit 67 |
| Wythe | Wytheville | 68.9 | 110.9 | US 21 south (Main Street) | South end of concurrency with US 21 |
| Wythe | Wytheville | 69.2 | 111.4 | US 21 north (Fourth Street) to I-77 / I-81 | North end of concurrency with US 21 |
| Wythe | Wytheville | | | SR 365 north – Wytheville Community College | |
| Wythe | Wytheville | 71.1 | 114.4 | I-77 north / I-81 south / US 52 north – Bluefield, Bristol | south end of concurrencies with I-77, I-81, and US 52; US 11 south follows exit 73 |
see I-81
| Pulaski | | 86.8 | 139.7 | I-81 north / SR 100 south (Wysor Road) – Roanoke, Hillsville | north end of concurrency with I-81; US 11 north follows exit 89B |
| Pulaski | Pulaski | 92.1 | 148.2 | SR 99 south (Main Street) | south end of SR 99 south overlap (southbound only) |
| Pulaski | Pulaski | 92.2 | 148.4 | SR 99 north (Third Street Northwest) | |
| Pulaski | Pulaski | | | Fourth Street Northwest | north end of SR 99 south overlap (southbound only) |
| Pulaski | Dublin | | | New River Community College (SR 373 east) | |
| Pulaski | Dublin | 99.1 | 159.5 | SR 100 to I-81 – NRV Airport, Pearisburg, Hillsville, Bristol, New River Community College | interchange |
| Pulaski | Fairlawn | 106.0 | 170.6 | SR 114 east (Peppers Ferry Road) | |
| City of Radford | | 107.1 | 172.4 | SR 232 south (West Main Street) to I-81 | |
| City of Radford | | 108.1 | 174.0 | SR 177 south (Tyler Avenue) to I-81 | former SR 102 south |
| Montgomery | Christiansburg | 116.3 | 187.2 | SR 8 south (West Main Street) to I-81 | |
| Montgomery | Christiansburg | 116.6 | 187.6 | US 460 Bus. west (North Franklin Street) | South end of concurrency with US 460 Business |
| Montgomery | Christiansburg | 117.8 | 189.6 | SR 111 west (Depot Street) | |
| Montgomery | Christiansburg | 118.6 | 190.9 | US 460 to I-81 / Falling Branch Road – Blacksburg, Bristol, Roanoke, Virginia Tech | interchange; US 460 exit 2 |
| Montgomery | Christiansburg | 119.6 | 192.5 | I-81 / US 460 west – Salem, Roanoke, Bristol | I-81 exit 118C; north terminus of US 460 Business overlap; south end of concurrency with US 460 |
| Roanoke | | | | SR 647 (Dow Hollow Road) to I-81 – Christiansburg, Salem | |
| City of Salem | | 139.7 | 224.8 | SR 112 west (Wildwood Road) to I-81 | |
| City of Salem | | 141.0 | 226.9 | US 11 Alt. north to US 460 Alt. east (4th Street) / I-81 | |
| City of Salem | | 141.8 | 228.2 | US 460 east (East Main Street) | East end of concurrency with US 460 |
| City of Salem | | 142.1 | 228.7 | SR 311 north (East Burwell Street to Thompson Memorial Drive) to I-81 | |
| City of Salem | | 142.4 | 229.2 | US 11 Alt. / US 460 Alt. (East 4th Street) | |
| City of Salem | | 143.8 | 231.4 | SR 419 (Electric Road) to US 220 / US 221 | |
| City of Roanoke | | 145.5 | 234.2 | SR 117 north (Peters Creek Road) | |
| City of Roanoke | | 147.2 | 236.9 | US 221 south / SR 116 south (Williamson Road) | South end of concurrency with US 221 and SR 116 |
| City of Roanoke | | 149.4 | 240.4 | I-581 north / US 220 north – Lexington, Salem | I-581 exit 5; northbound exit and southbound entrance |
| City of Roanoke | | 149.8 | 241.1 | US 221 north / US 11 Alt. south / US 460 / SR 116 north (Orange Avenue / US 220 Alt.) to I-581 / US 220 – Lynchburg | North end of concurrency with US 221 and SR 116 |
| City of Roanoke | | 152.5 | 245.4 | SR 101 west (Hershberger Road) to I-581 / US 220 – Roanoke Regional Airport | |
| City of Roanoke | | 152.6 | 245.6 | SR 118 north (Airport Road) – Roanoke Regional Airport | |
| Roanoke | Hollins | 154.6 | 248.8 | SR 117 south (Peters Creek Road) to I-581 – Salem | |
| Roanoke | Hollins | 154.9 | 249.3 | SR 115 (Plantation Road) to I-81 / US 220 | |
| Botetourt | | 159.0 | 255.9 | US 220 Alt. (Roanoke Road / Cloverdale Road) to I-64 / I-81 / US 220 north / US 460 – Fincastle, Lexington, Staunton, Roanoke, Bristol, Lynchburg | |
| Botetourt | Troutville | | | SR 670 (Trinity Road) – Fincastle | former SR 294 north |
| Botetourt | | 170.9 | 275.0 | I-81 – Lexington, Roanoke | I-81 exit 162 |
| Botetourt | Buchanan | 175.1 | 281.8 | SR 43 south (Parkway Drive) / SR 1305 (Lowe Street) – Blue Ridge Parkway | South end of concurrency with SR 43 |
| Botetourt | Buchanan | 175.9 | 283.1 | SR 43 north (First Street) / SR 1318 (Old Mill Road) – Eagle Rock | North end of concurrency with SR 43 |
| Botetourt | | 177.0 | 284.9 | I-81 south – Roanoke | south end of I-81 overlap; southbound exit and northbound entrance; US 11 south follows exit 167 |
| Botetourt | | 177.4 | 285.5 | SR 614 – Arcadia | I-81 exit 168 |
| Rockbridge | Springfield | 184.8 | 297.4 | I-81 north – Lexington | north end of concurrency with I-81; US 11 north follows exit 175 |
| Rockbridge | Natural Bridge | | | SR 130 east (Wert Faulkner Highway) – Natural Bridge, Glasgow, Lynchburg, Cave Mountain Lake | |
| Rockbridge | Fancy Hill | 190.1 | 305.9 | I-81 – Roanoke, Staunton | I-81 exit 180 |
| Rockbridge | | 198.5 | 319.5 | US 11 Bus. north (Main Street) / SR 251 south (Link Road) – Lexington, Collierstown | |
| Rockbridge | | 199.3 | 320.7 | US 60 to I-81 – Lexington, Buena Vista | interchange |
| City of Lexington | | 200.5 | 322.7 | US 11 Bus. south – Lexington | interchange; southbound exit and northbound entrance |
| Rockbridge | East Lexington | 201.5 | 324.3 | I-64 to I-81 – Charleston, Staunton | I-64 exit 55 |
| Rockbridge | East Lexington | 201.8 | 324.8 | SR 39 west (Maury River Road) – Rockbridge Baths, Goshen, Virginia Horse Center | |
| Rockbridge | | 205.4 | 330.6 | I-64 / I-81 – Staunton, Roanoke | I-81 exit 195 |
| Rockbridge | Steeles Tavern | | | SR 606 (Raphine Road) to I-64 / I-81 – Raphine | |
| Augusta | Steeles Tavern | 216.4 | 348.3 | SR 56 east (Tye River Turnpike) / SR 851 (Midway School Road) – Vesuvius | |
| Augusta | | | | SR 620 (Spottswood Road) – Spottswood | former SR 56 west |
| Augusta | | 224.1 | 360.7 | US 340 north (Stuarts Draft Highway) – Stuarts Draft, Waynesboro | |
| Augusta | | 224.2 | 360.8 | I-64 / I-81 – Lexington, Roanoke, Staunton | I-81 exit 213 |
| Augusta | | | | SR 701 (Howardsville Road) – Middlebrook | former SR 292 north |
| Augusta | Jolivue | 232.1 | 373.5 | SR 262 to I-64 / I-81 / SR 252 – Roanoke, Richmond, Winchester | interchange |
| City of Staunton | | 233.5 | 375.8 | US 11 Truck north (Statler Boulevard / SR 261) to US 250 | |
| City of Staunton | | 234.3 | 377.1 | US 250 east (Richmond Road) to I-64 / I-81 | South end of concurrency with US 250 |
| City of Staunton | | 234.4 | 377.2 | US 250 west / US 11 Bus. north (Greenville Avenue) / SR 254 west (South Coalter Street) – Historic District | North end of concurrency with US 250; south end of concurrency with SR 254 |
| City of Staunton | | 235.0 | 378.2 | SR 254 east (New Hope Road) | Interchange; north end of concurrency with SR 254 |
| City of Staunton | | 235.2 | 378.5 | US 11 Truck south / US 250 Truck east (Statler Boulevard / SR 261) to US 250 east | south end of US 250 Truck overlap |
| City of Staunton | | 237.1 | 381.6 | US 11 Bus. south (Augusta Street) | southbound exit and northbound entrance |
| City of Staunton | | 237.6 | 382.4 | SR 262 / US 250 Truck west (Woodrow Wilson Parkway) to I-81 / SR 254 – Waynesboro | north end of US 250 Truck overlap |
| Augusta | Weyers Cave | 246.3 | 396.4 | SR 256 east (Weyers Cave Road) to I-81 – Weyers Cave, Grottoes, Airport | |
| Augusta | | | | SR 646 (Fadley Road) to SR 42 | former SR 256 west |
| Rockingham | | 252.3 | 406.0 | SR 257 (Dinkel Avenue / Friedens Church Road) to I-81 – Bridgewater, Bridgewater College, Natural Chimneys | |
| City of Harrisonburg | | 255.4 | 411.0 | I-81 – Winchester, Roanoke | I-81 exit 243 |
| City of Harrisonburg | | 258.2 | 415.5 | To Maryland Avenue / Port Republic Road (SR 253 east) / I-81 / SR 42 | |
| City of Harrisonburg | | 259.3 | 417.3 | US 33 (Market Street) to I-81 | Court Square (traffic circle around Rockingham County Courthouse) (northbound only) |
| Rockingham | | 263.1 | 423.4 | I-81 – New Market, Staunton, Harrisonburg | I-81 exit 251 |
| Rockingham | Mauzy | 269.9 | 434.4 | SR 259 west (Mayland Road) – Broadway, Timberville | |
| Rockingham | Mauzy | 269.9 | 434.4 | I-81 – New Market, Harrisonburg | I-81 exit 257 |
| Rockingham | Mauzy | | | SR 608 (Mauzy Athlone Road) | former SR 259 east |
| Shenandoah | New Market | 277.1 | 445.9 | US 211 west (Old Cross Road / SR 1002) to I-81 | South end of concurrency with US 211 |
| Shenandoah | New Market | 277.4 | 446.4 | US 211 east (East Lee Highway) – Luray, Shenandoah National Park, Skyline Drive, Luray Caverns | North end of concurrency with US 211 |
| Shenandoah | | | | SR 767 (Quicksburg Road) to SR 42 – Quicksburg | former SR 262 west |
| Shenandoah | Mount Jackson | 284.0 | 457.1 | SR 263 west (Bryce Boulevard) – Basye, Orkney Springs | |
| Shenandoah | Mount Jackson | 285.3 | 459.1 | SR 292 west (Conicville Road) to I-81 / SR 703 – Conicville | |
| Shenandoah | Edinburg | 291.2 | 468.6 | SR 185 west / SR 675 west (Stoney Creek Boulevard) to I-81 / SR 42 – Lantz Mill | |
| Shenandoah | Woodstock | 295.5 | 475.6 | SR 42 south / SR 670 (Reservoir Road) to I-81 – Columbia Furnace | former SR 59 west |
| Shenandoah | Woodstock | | | Court Street | former SR 59 east |
| Shenandoah | Strasburg | 308.1 | 495.8 | SR 55 east (King Street) / to Industrial Access Road – Front Royal | South end of concurrency with SR 55 |
| Shenandoah | Strasburg | 308.3 | 496.2 | SR 55 west (John Marshall Highway) – Lebanon Church | North end of concurrency with SR 55 |
| Shenandoah | | 309.9 | 498.7 | I-81 to I-66 east – Woodstock, Winchester | I-81 exit 298 |
| Warren | No major junctions | | | | |
| Frederick | Stephens City | 318.6 | 512.7 | SR 277 east / SR 631 (Fairfax Street) to I-81 | |
| Frederick | Kernstown | 321.5 | 517.4 | SR 37 to I-81 – Romney, Berkeley Springs, Roanoke, Martinsburg | interchange |
| City of Winchester | | 325.8 | 524.3 | US 17 south / US 50 east / US 522 south (Millwood Avenue) to I-81 | south end of US 17 / US 50 / US 522 overlap |
| City of Winchester | | | | US 50 west (East Cork Street) | north end of US 17 / US 50 overlap |
| City of Winchester | | 326.8 | 525.9 | SR 7 east (East Piccadilly Street) | |
| City of Winchester | | | | US 522 north (Commercial Street) | north end of US 522 overlap |
| Frederick | | 328.7 | 529.0 | SR 37 south to US 522 north / US 50 west | interchange |
| Frederick | | 329.3 | 530.0 | I-81 – Martinsburg, Roanoke | I-81 exit 317 |
| Frederick | | | | SR 761 (Old Charlestown Road) – Summit Point | former SR 274 east |
| Frederick | Rest | 335.7 | 540.3 | US 11 north (Winchester Avenue) – Martinsburg | West Virginia state line |
1.000 mi = 1.609 km; 1.000 km = 0.621 mi: Concurrency terminus; Incomplete access

== See also ==
Spurs of US 11 in Virginia

- U.S. Route 11E, c. 1930 to present
- U.S. Route 11W, c. 1930 to present
- U.S. Route 211, 1926 to present
- U.S. Route 311, 1926 to mid-1930s, now part of U.S. Route 220
- U.S. Route 411, 1926 to early 1930s, now part of U.S. Route 58
- U.S. Route 411, mid-1930s to late 1970s, now U.S. Route 11E
- U.S. Route 511, 1926 to c. 1930, now U.S. Route 11E
- U.S. Route 11 Business (Virginia)

| Preceded by 11E - 11W | U.S. Route 11; Virginia | Succeeded by West Virginia |
