= Special routes of U.S. Route 11 =

Special routes of U.S. Route 11

Highway system
- United States Numbered Highway System; List; Special; Divided

At least 17 special routes of U.S. Route 11 (US 11) and at least one of US 11E have existed.

== Meridian business loop ==
U.S. Highway 11 Business
- Location: Meridian, Mississippi

== Tuscaloosa bypass route ==
U.S. Route 11 Bypass
- Location: Tuscaloosa, Alabama

== Chattanooga alternate route ==
U.S. Route 11 Alternate
- Location: Chattanooga, Tennessee

== Chattanooga business loop ==
U.S. Route 11 Business
- Location: Chattanooga, Tennessee

== Chattanooga bypass route ==
U.S. Route 11 Bypass
- Location: Chattanooga, Tennessee

== Cleveland bypass route ==
U.S. Route 11 Bypass
- Keith Street
- Location: Cleveland, Tennessee
- Length: 3.75 mi (6.04 km)
- Existed: 1956–present

U.S. Route 11 Bypass (US 11 Byp.) is a 3.75-mile-long (6.04 km) bypass route around downtown Cleveland, Tennessee, for US 11. It is a four-lane divided highway its entire length, and it is known as Keith Street.

US 11 Byp. begins at an intersection with US 11/US 64 (State Route 2 [SR 2], South Lee Highway) in Cleveland near Bradley Central High School. SR 2 turns north onto US 11 Byp. and runs as a hidden route. US 11/US 64 turns northeast into downtown as 3rd Street. At its terminus, it begins following immediately along South Mouse Creek. About one-third mile (0.54 km) later, the bypass intersects SR 312 (Harrison Pike/Inman Street), a connector to and formerly the route of US 64 about one-half mile (0.80 km) west of downtown. At this intersection, the Cleveland/Bradley County Greenway also begins, following alongside Mouse Creek. The route continues north through a historic residential district. Further along, US 11 Byp. comes to an intersection with SR 60 (25th Street). The route then enters a primarily commercial district, passing the corporate headquarters of Life Care Centers of America, and turns northeast, crossing Mouse Creek and the greenway. The route crosses Mouse Creek ridge, passing through commercial area, coming to an intersection with Woodcrest Avenue/Ocoee Crossing, a connector to US 11 (Ocoee Street). About one-half mile (0.80 km) later, the bypass comes to an end at an intersection with US 11 (Ocoee Street).

History
Built as a bypass to relieve downtown Cleveland from industrial and commercial traffic, Keith Street was the first bypass and four lane highway in Bradley County. The project began in 1956, with construction of a two-lane road by the city of Cleveland between US 11/64 (South Lee Highway/Third Street) and 17th Street. The section between 17th Street and US 11 was constructed as a four-lane divided highway by the state, with the construction contract let on October 30, 1959. The section opened to traffic on December 2, 1960. The state then assumed control of the remainder of the route, which was widened to four lanes in the earlier 1960s. Initially known as the Cleveland Bypass, Keith Street was named in honor of prominent local resident Keith Hines.

Originally, the route's state designation was SR 2 Byp., and SR 2 remained on the bypassed portion of US 11. In 1983, when the Tennessee Department of Transportation (TDOT) modified their highway numbering system, SR 2 was rerouted onto Keith Street. The section of US 11 between the southern terminus of Keith Street and the intersection with US 64 became part of SR 40 (which continues on US 64 into North Carolina, and the section between US 64 and Keith Street's northern terminus became part of SR 74.

Major intersections
The entire route is in Cleveland, Bradley County.

mi	km	Destinations	Notes
0.00	0.00	US 11 / US 64 (South Lee Highway/SR 2 west/SR 40 east) – Ooltewah, Downtown	Southern terminus; southern end of unsigned SR 2 concurrency
0.35	0.56	SR 312 west (Harrison Pike / W. Inman Street) – Downtown, Birchwood	
2.05	3.30	SR 60 (25th Street NW) to I-75 – Dayton, Dalton	Connector to APD-40
3.75	6.04	US 11 (Ocoee Street/SR 74 south/North Lee Highway/SR 2 east) – Downtown, Athens	Northern terminus of US 11 Bypass and unsigned SR 74; northern end of unsigned SR 2 concurrency
1.000 mi = 1.609 km; 1.000 km = 0.621 mi: Concurrency terminus

== Riceville–Athens business loop ==
U.S. Route 11 Business
- Location: Riceville–Athens, Tennessee
- Length: 9.7 mi (15.6 km)

U.S. Route 11 Business (US 11 Bus.) is a business route of US 11 that runs from Riceville to Athens, Tennessee. It runs along SR 39 in Riceville until it reaches downtown Athens where it becomes a one-way pair just before the intersection with Woodman Street. From there, US 11 Bus./SR 39 runs north and eastbound on Madison Avenue, while the southbound routes runs along Washington Street. At the McMinn County Courthouse, the routes turn onto a second one way pair specifically northbound along Jackson Street and southbound along White Street. The one-way pair ends as the routes merge into Jackson Street at Tennessee Wesleyan University between College Street and Coach Farmer Drive. On the verge of departing downtown, the road has one major intersection with SR 30 (Decatur Pike westbound and Green Street eastbound), then runs along the hills of the suburbanized landscape of the outskirts of the city. At an abandoned factory near a railroad line, Jackson Street ends as it makes a sharp turn west onto Redfern Drive and then crosses a railroad crossing before finally terminating at US 11.

Major Intersections
The entire route is in McMinn County.

Location	mi	km	Destinations	Notes
Riceville	0.0	0.0	US 11 / SR 39 west (Lee Highway/SR 2) – Calhoun, Charleston, Athens	Southern terminus; southern end of SR 39 concurrency
Athens	7.5	12.1	SR 39 east (East Washington Avenue/East Madison Avenue (one-way pair))	Northern end of SR 39 concurrency
Athens	8.0	12.9	SR 30 (Decatur Pike/Green Street) to I-75 – Decatur, Etowah	
Athens	9.7	15.6	US 11 (Congress Parkway/SR 2) – Sweetwater, Niota, Riceville, Calhoun	Northern terminus
1.000 mi = 1.609 km; 1.000 km = 0.621 mi: Concurrency terminus

== Greeneville business loop ==
U.S. Route 11E Business
- Location: Greeneville, Tennessee
- Length: 4.6 mi (7.4 km)

== Bristol truck route ==
U.S. Route 11 Truck
- Location: Bristol, Virginia
- Length: 2.2 mi (3.5 km)

U.S. Route 11 Truck (US 11 Truck), which shares a complete concurrency with US 19 Truck, provides a bypass route for truckers avoiding the residential area of Euclid Avenue.

== Salem–Roanoke alternate route ==
U.S. Route 11 Alternate
- Location: Salem–Roanoke, Virginia
- Length: 8 mi (13 km)

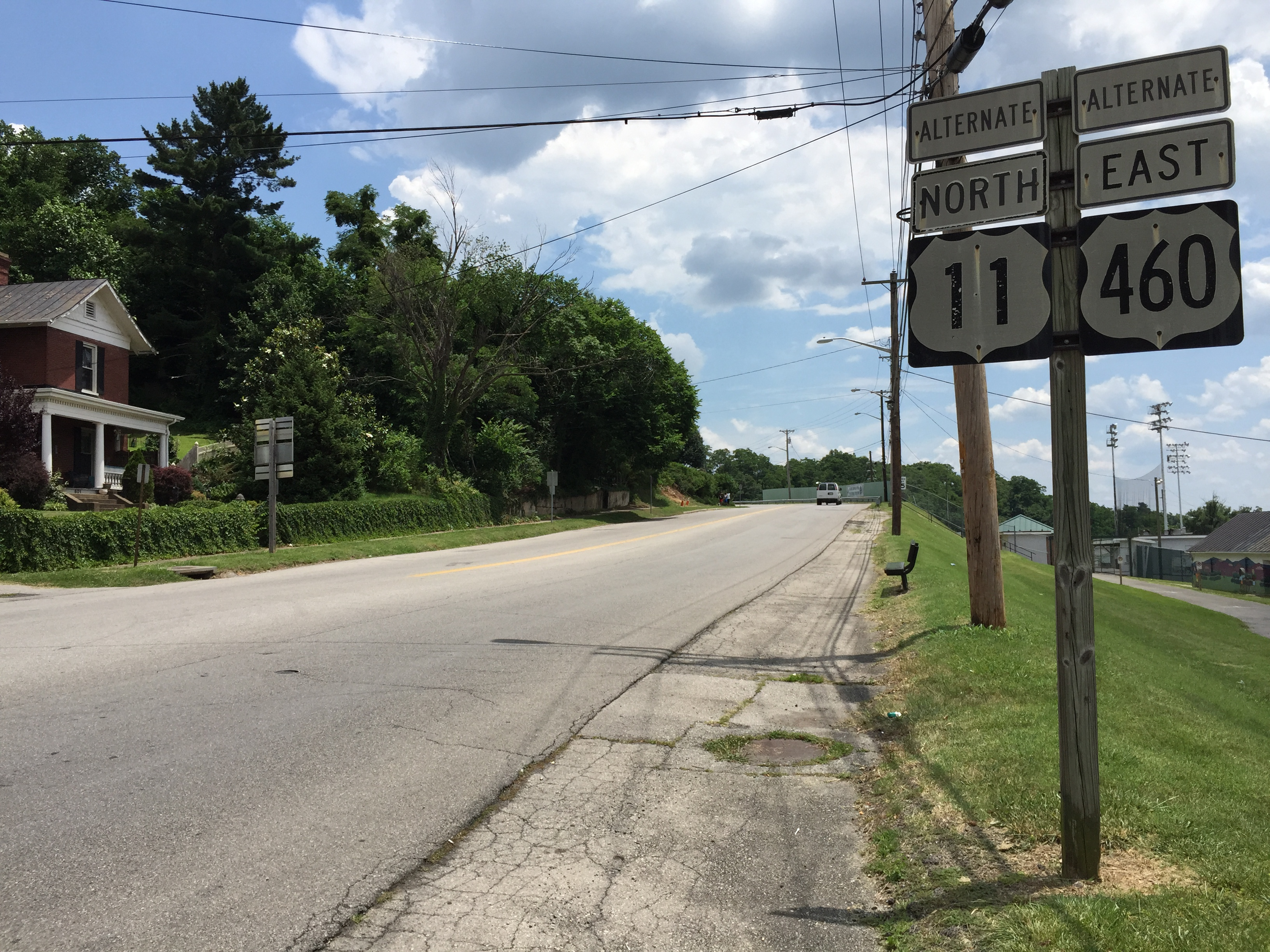
View north along US 11 Alt. and east along US 460 Alt. in Salem, Virginia

U.S. Route 11 Alternate (US 11 Alt.) is an eight-mile-long (13 km) alternate route in Salem and Roanoke, Virginia. It is concurrent with US 460 Alt. in Salem and US 460 in Roanoke for its entire length.

== Lexington business loop ==
U.S. Route 11 Business
- Location: Lexington, Virginia
- Length: 2.15 mi (3.46 km)

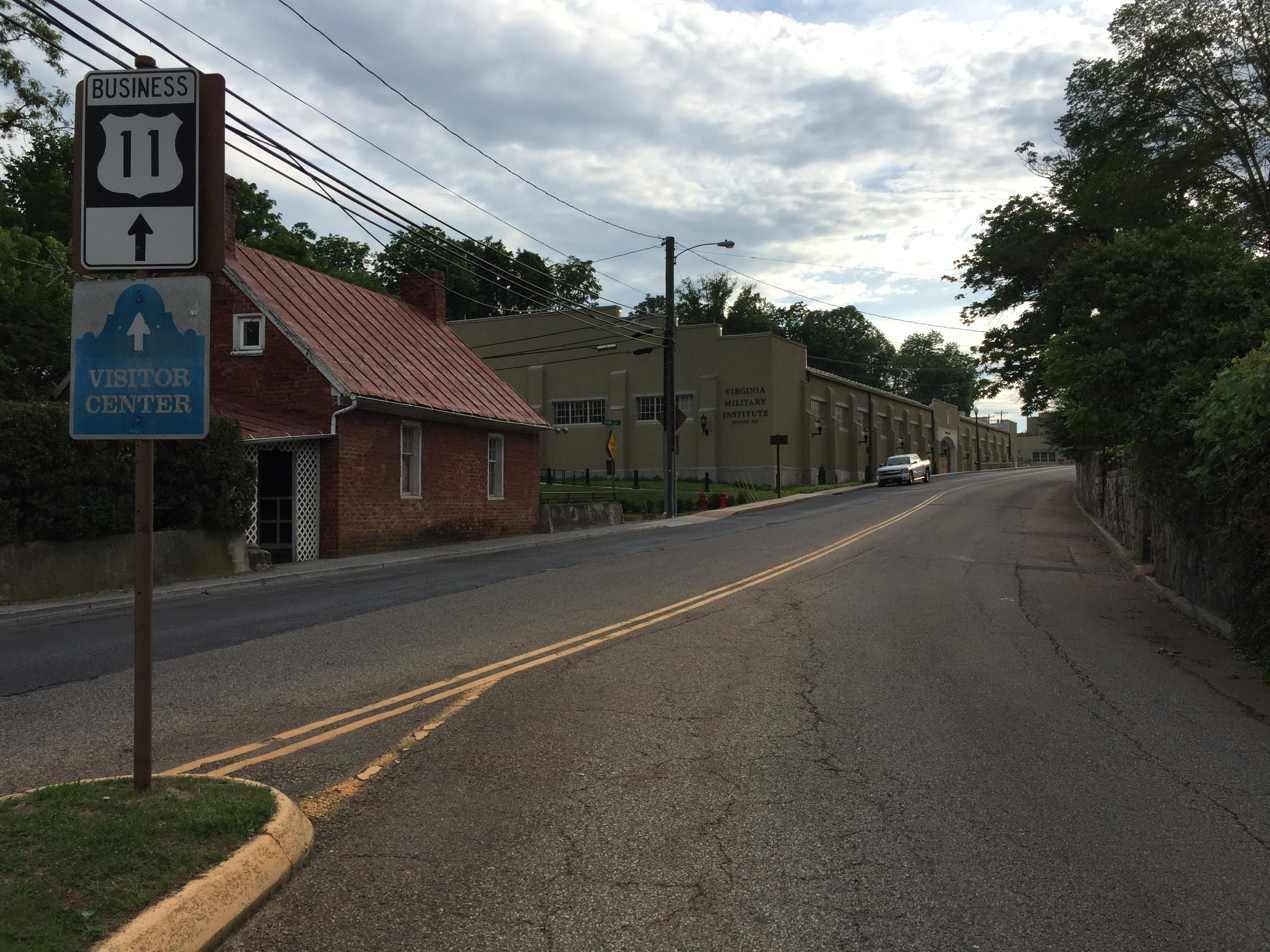
View south at the north end of US 11 Bus. at US 11 in Lexington, Virginia

U.S. Route 11 Business (US 11 Bus.) is a business route of US 11 in Lexington, Virginia, that is 2.15 miles (3.46 km) long. It starts at an intersection with US 11 and State Route 251 (SR 251) outside of Lexington and heads toward the center of town. In the center of town, it intersects US 60 and keeps heading through town. It then ends at an intersection with US 11.

History
In 1982, the section of US 11 Bus. between Jefferson and White streets was changed to be one-way northbound, and southbound US 11 Bus. was rerouted along Jefferson and White streets.

Major intersections

County	Location	mi	km	Destinations	Notes
Rockbridge		0.00	0.00	US 11 (Lee Highway) – Staunton, Natural Bridge State Park	Southern terminus
Rockbridge		0.00	0.00	SR 251 south (Thornhill Road) – Collierstown	Southern terminus
City of Lexington		1.2	1.9	US 60 (Nelson Street)	
City of Lexington		2.15	3.46	US 11 north (Lee Highway) to I-81	Northern terminus
1.000 mi = 1.609 km; 1.000 km = 0.621 mi

== Lexington bypass route ==
U.S. Route 11 Bypass
- Location: Lexington, Virginia

== Staunton business loop ==
U.S. Route 11 Business
- Location: Staunton, Virginia

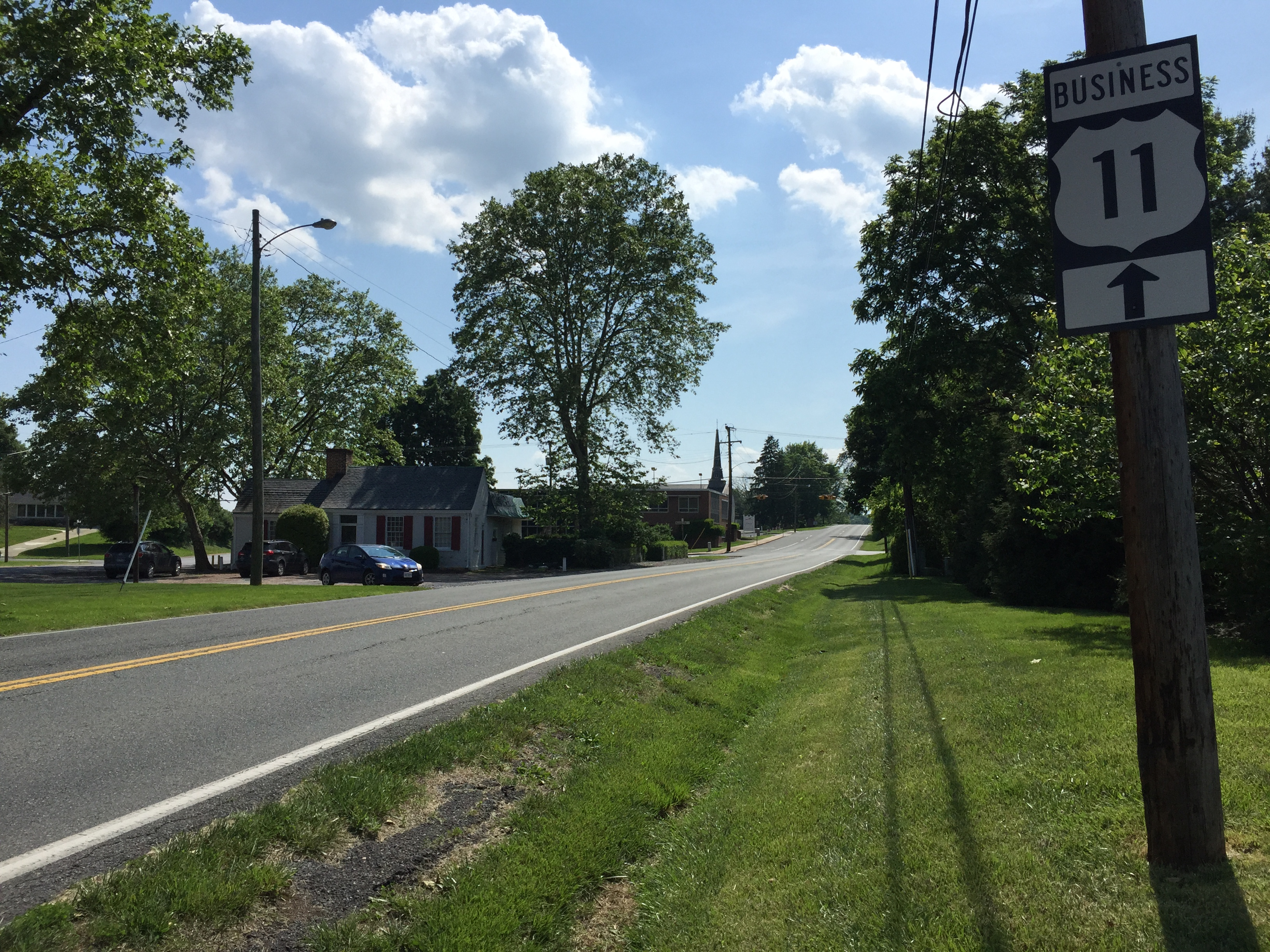
View south from the north end of US 11 Bus. in Staunton, Virginia

U.S. Route 11 Business (US 11 Bus.) is a business spur of US 11 in Staunton, Virginia. It is not a common Virginia Department of Transportation (VDOT) road because it only runs from the SR 262/US 11 intersection to US 11/US 250 in the downtown area. The road is commonly known as North Augusta Street and, prior to this, the Lee Highway. Some major points on this road include Terry Court Shopping Center, St. John's United Methodist Church, United States Postal Service Staunton Office, Kings Daughter Rehabilation Center, Staunton Public Library, and Staunton's Downtown District.

== Staunton truck route ==
U.S. Route 11 Truck
- Location: Staunton, Virginia

== Winchester alternate route ==
U.S. Route 11 Alternate
- Location: Winchester, Virginia

== Lemoyne alternate route ==
U.S. Route 11 Alternate
- Location: Lemoyne, Pennsylvania
- Existed: 1940s–1960s

U.S. Route 11 Alternate (US 11 Alt.) was an alternate route of US 11 between Camp Hill and Wormleysburg in Pennsylvania, passing through Lemoyne. US 11 Alt. began at US 11/US 15 at the intersection of 32nd and Market streets in Camp Hill, heading east along Market Street. The route continued into Lemoyne and curved to the northeast, intersecting US 111 at 3rd Street. At this point, US 11 Alt. became concurrent with US 111, and the two routes continued northeast along Market Street, crossing a Pennsylvania Railroad line as the road curved northwest to follow the west bank of the Susquehanna River. US 11 Alt./US 111 became Front Street and passed the western ends of the Market Street Bridge and the Walnut Street Bridge, which both cross the river to Harrisburg. The alternate route continued along the west bank of the Susquehanna River into Wormleysburg, where it and US 111 both ended at an intersection with US 11/US 15 at Walnut Street, where Front Street continued north as US 11/US 15.

With the creation of the U.S. Numbered Highway System in 1926, Market Street through Camp Hill and Lemoyne was designated as part of US 11/Pennsylvania Route 13 (PA 13), which crossed the Susquehanna River into Harrisburg on the Market Street Bridge. US 15 ran concurrent with US 11 on Market Street in Lemoyne east of State Street while US 111/PA 4 was concurrent east of 3rd Street in Lemoyne. In 1928, PA 5 was designated onto Front Street in Lemoyne and Wormleysburg while the PA 13 and PA 4 designations were decommissioned along Market Street. In the 1930s, PA 14 replaced the PA 5 designation along Front Street. US 11/US 15 were realigned to run along Front Street in 1941, replacing PA 14. In the 1940s, US 11 was shifted to bypass Lemoyne to the northwest, replacing US 11 Byp., while US 11 Alt. was designated onto the former alignment of US 11 between Camp Hill and Wormleysburg, running concurrent with US 15 between State Street in Lemoyne and Wormleysburg. US 15 was realigned to the west in the 1950s, following US 11 along the bypass, with US 111 extended north along US 11 Alt. to end at US 11/US 15 in Wormleysburg. US 11 Alt. was decommissioned in the 1960s, with the former alignment becoming unnumbered.

Major intersections
The entire route was in Cumberland County.

Location	mi	km	Destinations	Notes
Camp Hill			US 11 / US 15 (Market Street/32nd Street)	Southern terminus
Lemoyne			US 111 south (3rd Street)	South end of US 111 overlap
Wormleysburg			US 11 / US 15 (Walnut Street/Front Street)	Northern terminus; north end of US 111 overlap
1.000 mi = 1.609 km; 1.000 km = 0.621 mi: Concurrency terminus

== Lemoyne bypass route ==
U.S. Route 11 Bypass
- Location: Lemoyne, Pennsylvania
- Existed: 1930s–1940s

U.S. Route 11 Bypass (US 11 Byp.) was a bypass of the section of US 11 between Camp Hill and Wormleysburg in Pennsylvania, bypassing Lemoyne. The route began at an intersection with US 11 (Market Street) and the eastern terminus of PA 641 (32nd Street) in Camp Hill, heading north on multilane 32nd Street. The road curved east and became Cumberland Boulevard, heading into Wormleysburg. Here, US 11 Byp. became Walnut Street and headed northeast, crossing a Pennsylvania Railroad line and coming to its terminus at an intersection with US 11/US 15 (Front Street) on the west bank of the Susquehanna River.

US 11 Byp. was first designated in the 1930s. At this time, the route began at US 11/PA 641 in Camp Hill and headed north and east to Wormleysburg, where it intersected PA 14 at Front Street and headed southeast concurrent with that route on Front Street to end at US 11/US 15 at the west end of the Walnut Street Bridge over the Susquehanna River to Harrisburg. In 1941, the eastern terminus of the bypass route was cut back to Wormleysburg after US 11/US 15 were realigned to replace PA 14 on Front Street. In the 1940s, US 11 Byp. was replaced with mainline US 11, with the former alignment of US 11 between Camp Hill and Wormleysburg designated as US 11 Alt.

Major intersections
The entire route was in Cumberland County.

Location	mi	km	Destinations	Notes
Camp Hill			US 11 (Market Street) PA 641 west (32nd Street)	Southern terminus
Wormleysburg			US 11 / US 15 (Front Street) – Marysville, Selinsgrove, Harrisburg	Northern terminus
1.000 mi = 1.609 km; 1.000 km = 0.621 mi

== See also ==
- List of special routes of the United States Numbered Highway System
