= Virginia State Route 262 =

State highway in Virginia, United States

State Route 262
- Woodrow Wilson Parkway

Route information
- Maintained by VDOT
- Length: 13.70 mi (22.05 km)
- Existed: 1970s–present

Major junctions
- South end: I-64 / I-81 near Jolivue
- US 11 in Jolivue; SR 252 near Staunton; SR 254 near Staunton; US 250 in Staunton; I-81 near Staunton
- North end: SR 254 near Staunton

Location
- Country: United States
- State: Virginia
- Counties: Augusta, City of Staunton

Highway system
- Virginia Routes; Interstate; US; Primary; Secondary; Byways; History; HOT lanes
← SR 261	→ SR 263

State Route 262 (SR 262) is a primary state highway in the U.S. state of Virginia. Known as Woodrow Wilson Parkway or the Staunton Beltway, the state highway runs 13.70 miles (22.05 km) from Interstate 64 (I-64) and I-81 near Jolivue west, north, and east in a clockwise loop to SR 254 east of Staunton. SR 262 is a three-quarter circumferential highway around Staunton and adjacent portions of Augusta County. The highway contains two- and four-lane freeway and controlled-access segments and interchanges with several major highways, including U.S. Route 11 (US 11), SR 252, and SR 254 south of Staunton, US 250 on the west side of the city, and I-81 east of Staunton.

== Route description ==
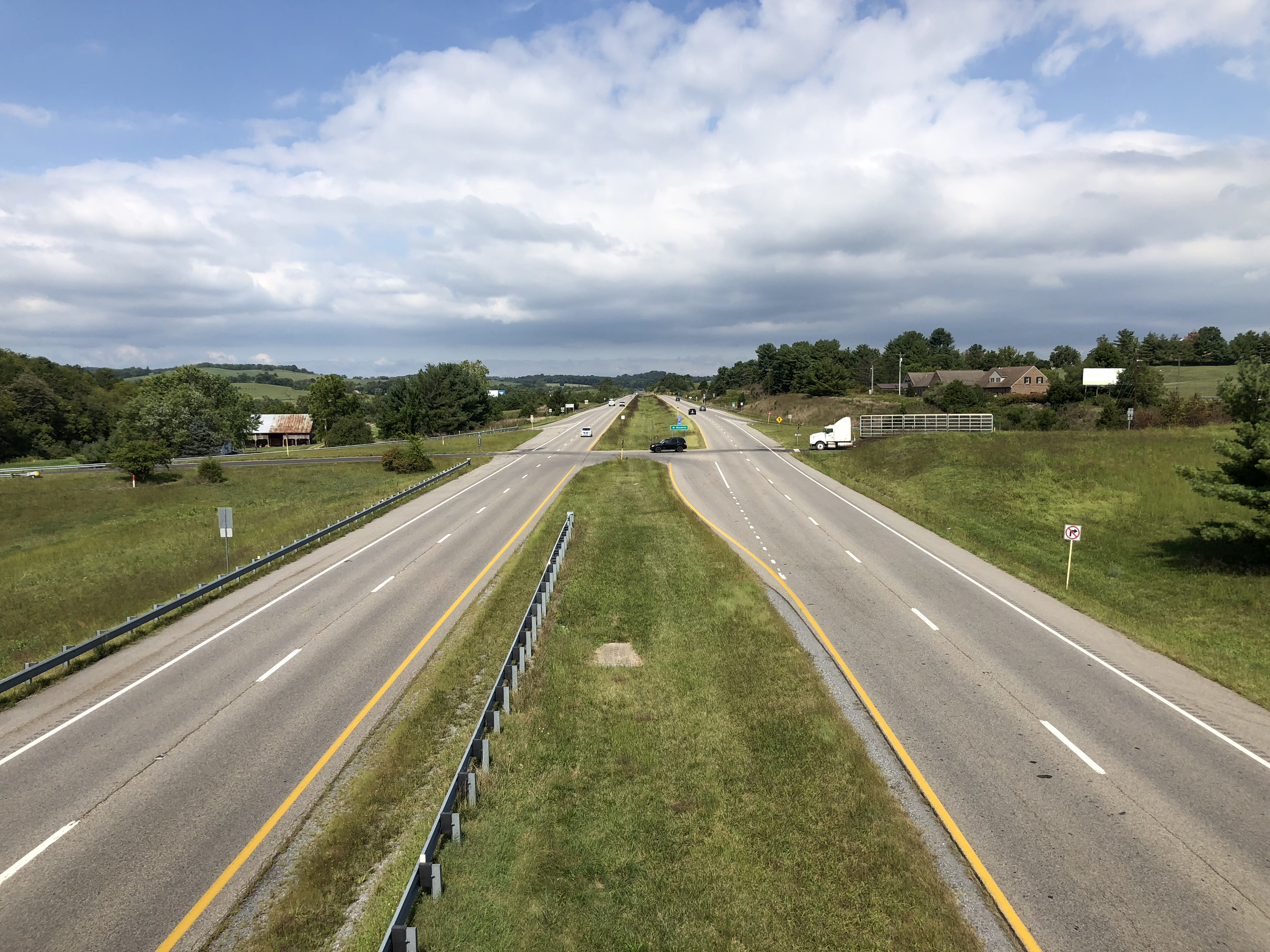
SR 262 southbound viewed from I-81 northeast of Staunton

SR 262 begins at a trumpet interchange with I-64 and I-81 a short distance south of where the Interstates diverge to head toward Richmond and Winchester, respectively. The state highway heads northwest as a four-lane freeway that meets US 11 (Greenville Avenue) at a partial cloverleaf interchange at the north end of Jolivue. West of its partial cloverleaf interchange with SR 613 (Old Greenville Road), SR 262 becomes a two-lane undivided freeway on a four-lane right-of-way. The state highway has a partial cloverleaf interchange with SR 252 (Middlebrook Avenue), after which the freeway follows the boundary between Augusta County and the independent city of Staunton. SR 262 curves north, crosses CSX's North Mountain Subdivision, and has diamond interchanges with SR 254 (Parkersburg Turnpike) and SR 720 (Morris Mill Road).

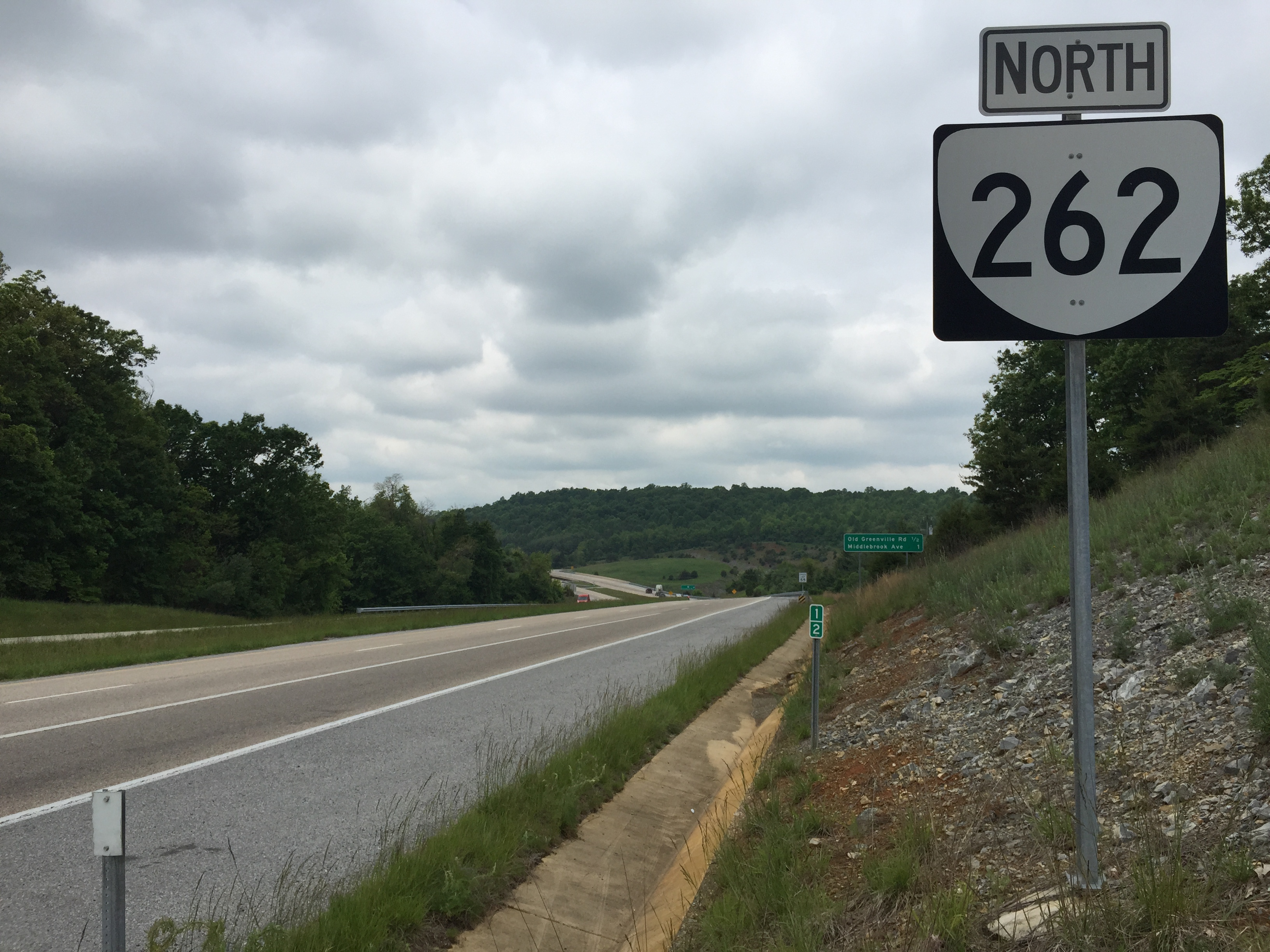
View north along SR 262 near US 11 south of Staunton

SR 262 enters the city of Staunton shortly before its diamond interchange with US 250 (Churchville Avenue), where the freeway ends and the highway begins to run concurrently with US 250 Truck. The highways head east through at-grade uncontrolled intersections with SR 742 (Shutterlee Mill Road) and SR 613 (Spring Hill Road). US 250 Truck diverges from SR 262 at its intersection with US 11 (Commerce Road). The state highway continues southeast through a grade crossing of the Chesapeake Western Railway and expands to a four-lane divided highway just west of SR F-224, which is used to access a country club to the north. SR 262 leaves Staunton and re-enters Augusta County just west of its diamond interchange with I-81. The state highway reduces to two lanes before reaching its northern terminus at SR 254, which heads southwest toward Staunton as New Hope Road and east toward Waynesboro as Hermitage Road.

== Major intersections ==
County	Location	mi	km	Destinations	Notes
Augusta		0.00	0.00	I-64 / I-81 – Richmond, Winchester, Roanoke, Charleston	Exit 220 (I-81); southern terminus
Augusta	Jolivue	1.07	1.72	US 11 – Greenville, Staunton	Partial cloverleaf interchange
Augusta		2.01	3.23	SR 613 (Old Greenville Road)	interchange
Augusta		3.14	5.05	SR 252 (Middlebrook Avenue)	interchange
Augusta		5.01	8.06	SR 254 (Parkersburg Pike)	Diamond interchange
Augusta				SR 720 (Morris Mill Road)	Diamond interchange
City of Staunton		7.42	11.94	US 250 (Churchville Avenue) – Monterey	Diamond interchange; south end of US 250 Truck overlap
City of Staunton				SR 742 (Shutterlee Mill Road)	north end of freeway
Augusta				SR 613 (Spring Hill Road)	
City of Staunton		11.38	18.31	US 11 / US 250 Truck east (Commerce Road) – Verona, Harrisonburg, Staunton	North end of concurrency with US 250 Truck
Augusta		12.77	20.55	I-81 – Winchester, Roanoke	Exit 225 (I-81)
Augusta	Annex	13.70	22.05	SR 254 (New Hope Road / Hermitage Road) – Waynesboro, Staunton	Northern terminus
1.000 mi = 1.609 km; 1.000 km = 0.621 mi: Concurrency terminus
