= Interstate 81 in Virginia =

Section of Interstate Highway in Virginia, United States

Interstate 81
- I-81 highlighted in red

Route information
- Maintained by VDOT
- Length: 324.92 mi (522.91 km)
- Existed: August 14, 1957–present
- NHS: Entire route

Major junctions
- South end: I-81 at the Tennessee state line in Bristol, TN
- I-381 in Bristol; US 21 / US 52 in Wytheville; I-77 near Wytheville; US 460 in Christiansburg; Future I-73 / I-581 / US 220 near Roanoke; US 60 in Lexington; I-64 from Lexington to Staunton; US 250 near Staunton; I-66 near Middletown; US 17 / US 50 / US 522 in Winchester
- North end: I-81 at the West Virginia state line in Rest

Location
- Country: United States
- State: Virginia
- Counties: City of Bristol, Washington, Smyth, Wythe, Pulaski, Montgomery, Roanoke, City of Salem, City of Roanoke, Botetourt, Rockbridge, Augusta, Rockingham, City of Harrisonburg, Shenandoah, Warren, Frederick

Highway system
- Interstate Highway System; Main; Auxiliary; Suffixed; Business; Future; Virginia Routes; Interstate; US; Primary; Secondary; Byways; History; HOT lanes
← SR 80	→ SR 82

Interstate 81 (I-81) is an 855.02-mile-long (1,376.02 km) Interstate Highway. In the US state of Virginia, I-81 runs for 324.92 miles (522.91 km), making the portion in Virginia longer than any other state's portion of the route. It is also the longest Interstate Highway within the borders of Virginia. It stretches from the Tennessee state line near Bristol to the West Virginia state line near Winchester. It enters Virginia from Bristol, Tennessee, and leaves Virginia into Berkeley County, West Virginia. The route passes through the cities of Bristol, Roanoke, Salem, Lexington, Staunton, and Harrisonburg.

== Route description ==
=== Tennessee to Wytheville ===
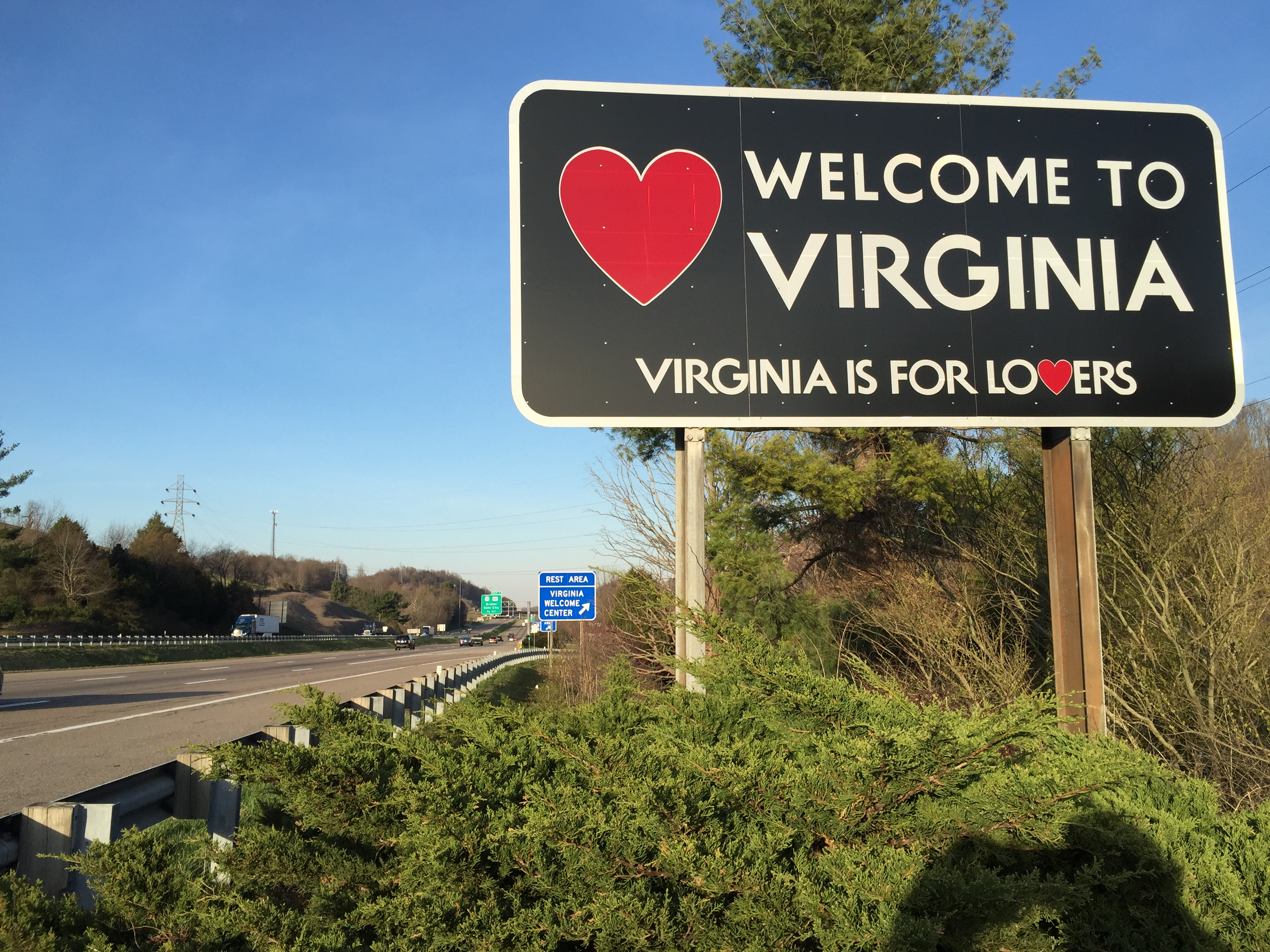
Welcome sign along northbound I-81 entering Virginia from Tennessee

I-81 enters Virginia from Tennessee, where the Interstate continues southwest toward Knoxville. After crossing the state line, the highway effectively becomes the border between Washington County to the northwest and the independent city of Bristol to the southeast. I-81 continues northeast as a six-lane freeway through sparsely populated residential areas on the outskirts of Bristol. The highway immediately comes to a northbound rest area that does not serve trucks, before it reaches an interchange with US Route 58 (US 58) and US 421 that also serve the town of Gate City, the county seat of neighboring Scott County to the west. Eastbound US 58 merges onto northbound I-81 to form a concurrency that continues northeast to a directional stack interchange with the northern terminus of I-381, an auxiliary Interstate Highway that serves downtown Bristol to the south. The freeway heads into a mix of commercial and residential areas where it has interchanges with US 11/US 19 prior to crossing over the Norfolk Southern Railway's Pulaski District, before the route fully enters Washington County. I-81/US 58 narrows to four lanes and heads into wooded rural areas with nearby development, coming to another interchange serving US 11/US 19 as well as an interchange with State Route 611 (SR 611) and a northbound truck rest area, before it passes along the southern edge of the town limits of Abingdon, the county seat of Washington County. South of Abingdon, the freeway interchanges with SR 140, which provides access to US 19 and Virginia Highlands Community College. North of this point are interchanges with US 58 Alternate (US 58 Alt)/SR 75, providing access to the Virginia Creeper Trail and Barter Theatre and with US 11, where eastbound US 58 splits from I-81 continuing east toward the town of Damascus.

I-81 continues northeast from Abingdon along its own alignment, interchanging with SR 704, SR 80 south of the unincorporated village of Meadowview, and SR 737 south of the unincorporated town of Emory. The highway then comes to an interchange with SR 91 in a commercial area, south of the town of Glade Spring that also provides access to the town of Saltville in the north. Past SR 91, the freeway begins to closely parallel US 11 on its southeastern side, reaching an interchange with that route before it curves and enters Smyth County, after which it crosses the Middle Fork of the Holston River and comes to an interchange with SR 107, within the town limits of Chilhowie. Northwest of Chilhowie, I-81 meets US 11/SR 645 at an interchange, southwest of the unincorporated village of Seven Mile Ford, where US 11 parallels the highway closely on the southeast once more. The freeway crosses over US 11, where that route moves to the northwest side of the highway, before reaching a split interchange serving the US Route, located to the southwest of the town of Marion, the county seat of Smyth County. Within Marion, I-81 interchanges with SR 16 that provides access to Mount Rogers National Recreation Area, Emory and Henry University's School of Health Sciences, and Grayson Highlands State Park, before reaching another interchange for US 11 outside the city limits, that also provides access to Hungry Mother State Park. From this point, the freeway is dedicated to Representative William C. Wampler and passes through rural areas of agriculture and rolling hills, with scattered areas of residences and industry. In this area, I-81 has interchanges with US 11 in the unincorporated town of Atkins. It then crosses over US 11 and the Pulaski District rail line and passes a southbound rest area, with SR 683 near the unincorporated village of Groseclose, before passing to the northwest of Mountain Empire Airport prior to coming into Wythe County.

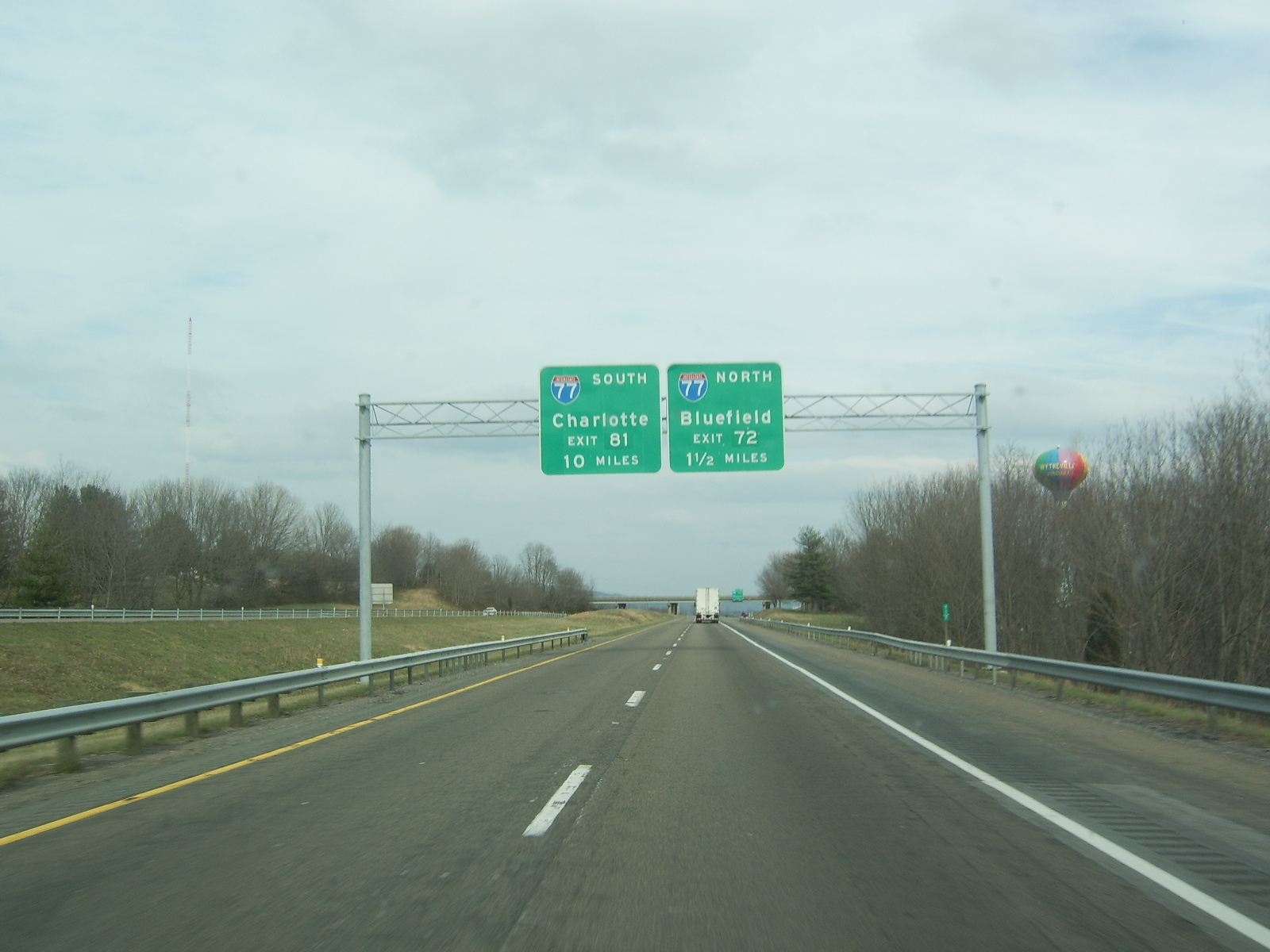
I-81 northbound at the southern end of the I-77 concurrency

Upon entering Wythe County, I-81 continues to an interchange with the northern terminus of SR 90 north of the town of Rural Retreat, before reaching a northbound cars-only rest area and passing southeast of the Wythe Raceway. Past the racetrack, the freeway travels northeast to a northbound exit and southbound entrance with US 11, located west of the town of Wytheville, the county seat of Wythe County. Inside the town limits of Wytheville, I-81 meets an interchange with the northern terminus of US 21 and US 52, where southbound US 52 joins the freeway in a wrong-way concurrency, before it reaches its southern junction with I-77, which heads north from the highway toward Bluefield and Charleston, West Virginia, at a trumpet interchange.

=== Wytheville to Roanoke ===
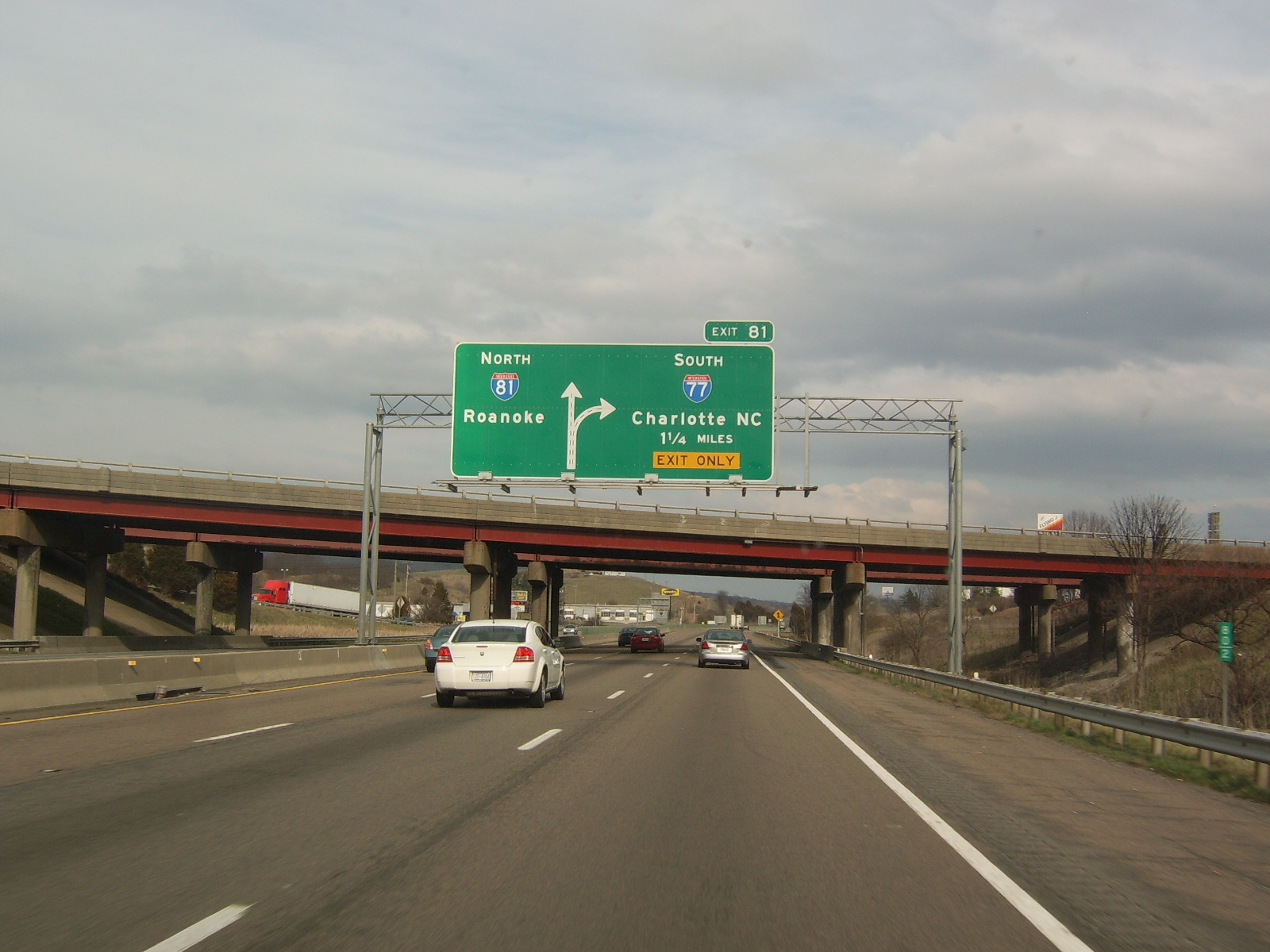
I-81 northbound at the northern end of the I-77 concurrency

At this point, I-77 joins I-81/US 52 in a wrong-way concurrency as the route expands to six lanes and deviates slightly to the southeast of its original heading, before picking up US 11 at another trumpet interchange, a short distance later. Northbound US 11 joins the extensive wrong-way concurrency as it crosses the Pulaski District line and zigzags away from Wytheville to an interchange with two state frontage roads, SR F042/SR F043. The median narrows to a Jersey barrier as the freeway comes to an interchange with the southern terminus of SR 121, where southbound US 52 splits from the concurrency to serve the unincorporated town of Fort Chiswell. Shortly afterward, southbound I-77 itself splits from I-81/US 11 at a trumpet interchange and heads south to serve Charlotte, North Carolina. Following the northern junction with I-77, the freeway resumes its northeasterly course, regains its median, and reduces back to four lanes as it comes to an interchange with SR 619 north of the hamlet of Graham's Forge. From here, I-81/US 11 continues to an interchange with another pair of state frontage roads, SR F044/SR F045, before it crosses into Pulaski County. Past the Pulaski County line, the freeway reaches an interchange with SR 100, which heads south toward the town of Hillsville in adjacent Carroll County and where northbound US 11 splits from I-81, which heads north to serve the town of Pulaski, the county seat of Pulaski County. Past this interchange, northbound SR 100 joins I-81 in another concurrency and reaches another interchange with SR 658 in the unincorporated village of Draper. The freeway heads through areas of wooded hills interchanging with the southern terminus of SR 99 near a park and ride lot, before reaching the northern junction with SR 100, where that route splits and provides access to the Wilderness Road Regional Museum, Southwest Virginia Veterans' Cemetery, New River Community College, New River Valley Airport, and the unincorporated town of Newbern as the route heads north to serve the towns of Dublin and Pearisburg; the latter town is the county seat of neighboring Giles County. I-81 again continues by itself, coming to an interchange with SR 660 north of Claytor Lake State Park, before it crosses a bridge dedicated to Trooper Andrew Fox over the New River and leaves Pulaski County.

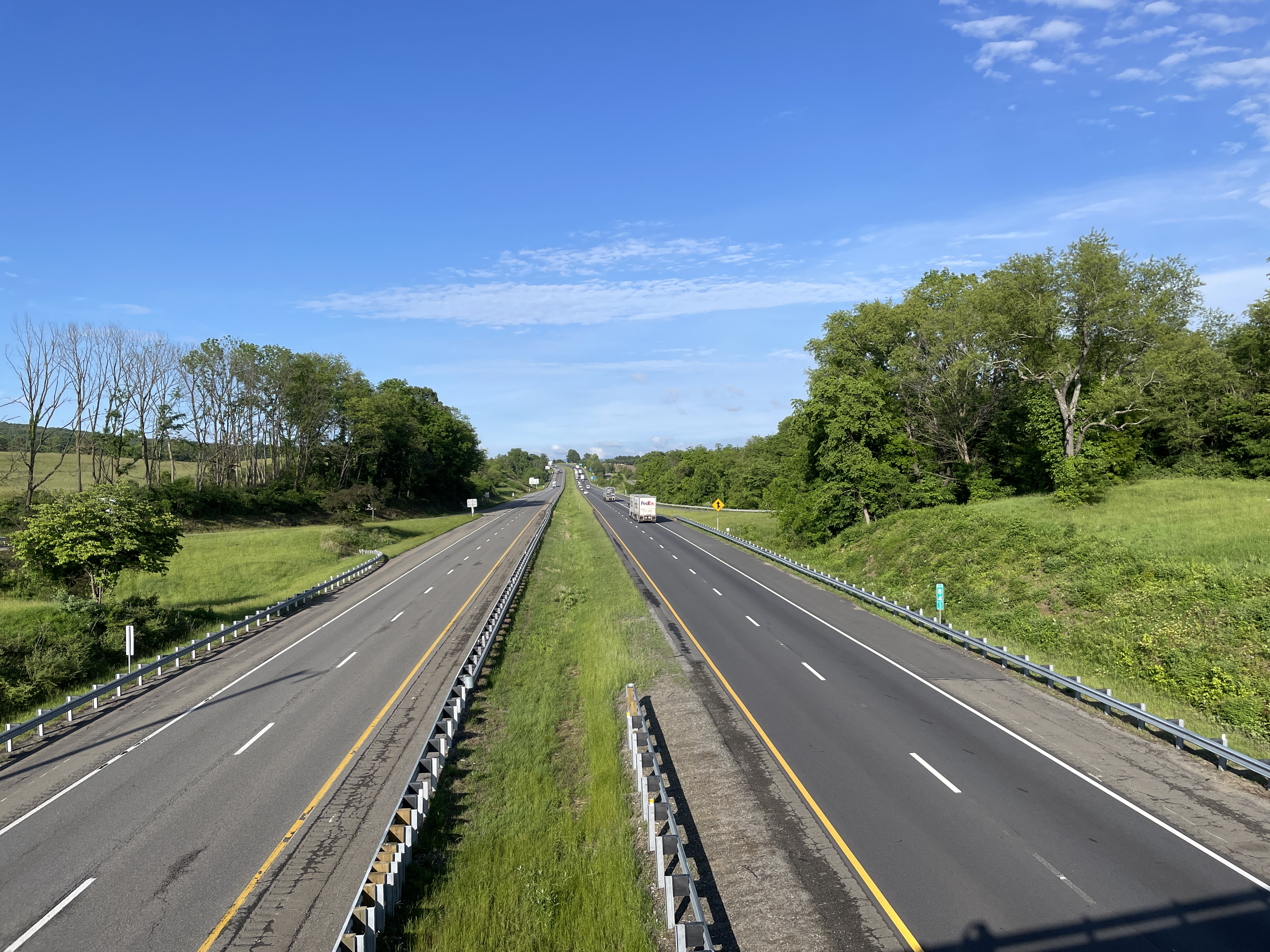
I-81/US 11 northbound at the SR 619 interchange in Max Meadows

Immediately past the New River, the freeway becomes the border between Montgomery County to the southeast and the independent city of Radford to the northwest, where it interchanges with SR 232/SR 605. From this point, I-81 fully enters Montgomery County, coming to rest areas in both directions prior to an interchange with SR 177/SR 600, which also provides access to Radford University. The freeway continues and meets an interchange with SR 8 that also provides access to the Montgomery Museum of Art & History and the Blue Ridge Parkway, before entering the town limits of Christiansburg. Shortly afterward, I-81 comes a large cloverleaf interchange for US 11, US 460, and Parkway Drive, where it splits with the outer lanes becoming a collector–distributor road, which US 11/US 460 briefly run along; southbound US 11/westbound US 460 provides to the main campus of Virginia Tech in the nearby town of Blacksburg. A short distance later, northbound US 11/eastbound US 460 split at another interchange and provide access to the communities of Shawsville and Elliston, while the freeway's collector–distributor carriageways ends and it enters widing alignments that heads toward the valley of the Roanoke River. I-81 crosses over Norfolk Southern Railway's Whitethorne District rail line as it continues through mountainous surroundings with no nearby exits, before it comes a distance to reach the next exit with SR 603 northeast of the unincorporated village of Ironto. From here, the freeway crosses Norfolk Southern Railway's Christiansburg District line and the North Fork of the Roanoke River to the west of the confluence with the South Fork of that river, that forms the Roanoke River, and then comes to a northbound rest area before the highway becomes dedicated to Andrew Lewis and crosses into Roanoke County. From this point, I-81 interchanges with SR 647 next to the Dixie Caverns attraction, before it becomes the border between Roanoke County to the northwest and the independent city of Salem to the southeast. Northwest of Salem, the freeway has interchanges at SR 112/SR 619, after crossing an overpass dedicated to Trooper Ricky McCoy with SR 311, that also provides access to Roanoke College, and SR 419 that provides access to the Salem Campus of American National University, the Salem VA Medical Center, and the Salem Fair grounds. Afterward, I-81 fully reenters Roanoke County and comes to a directional stack interchange with I-581/US 220 which lead south to the downtown area of the independent city of Roanoke and Roanoke–Blacksburg Regional Airport, as well as providing access to the Blue Ridge Parkway, Virginia Museum of Transportation, and Virginia Western Community College; I-581 is proposed to become part of I-73 in the future.

=== Roanoke to Lexington ===
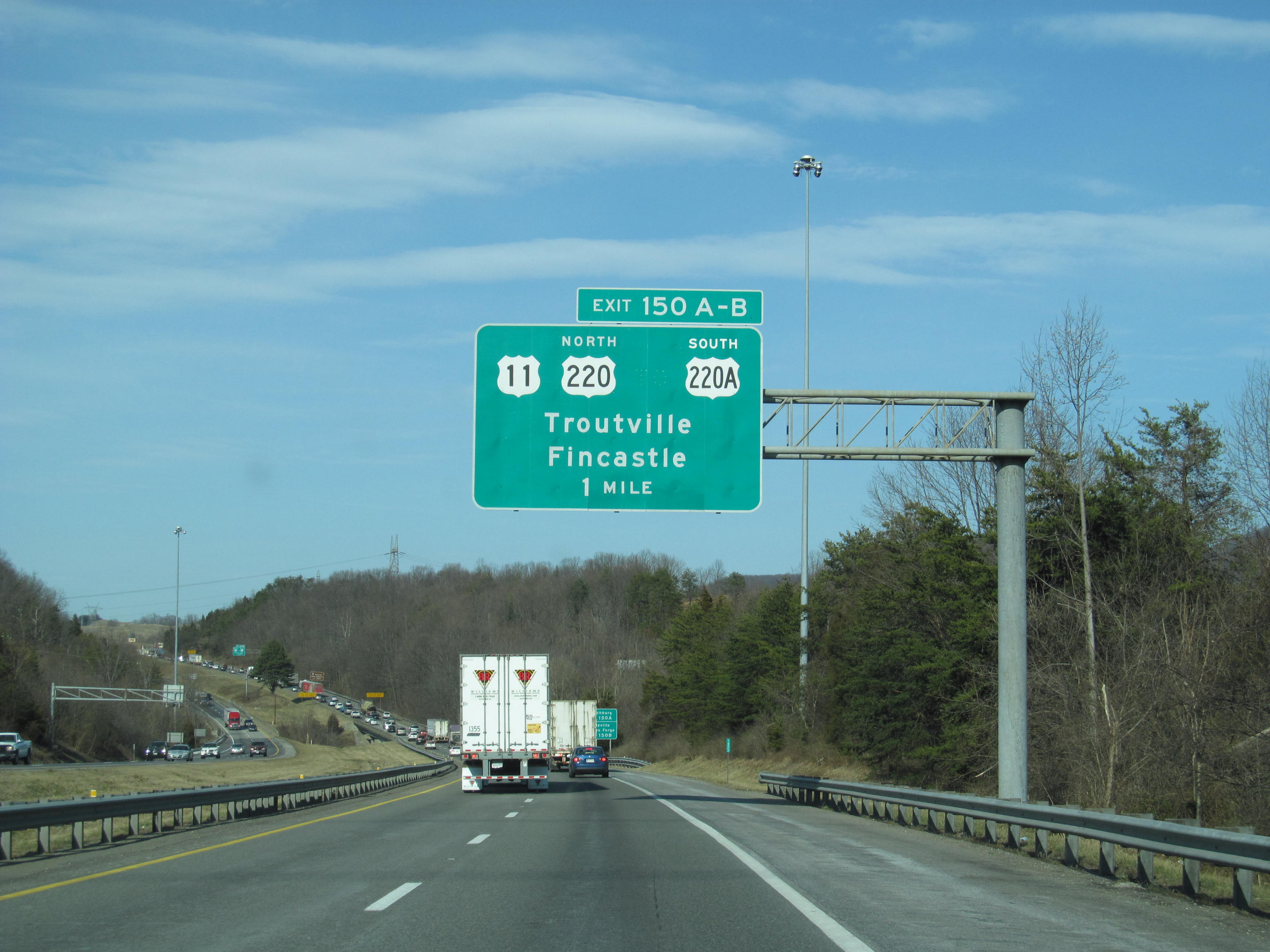
I-81 approaching exit 150

Past I-581, northbound US 220 joins northbound I-81 in a concurrency, as the routes come to an interchange with SR 115 north of the unincorporated city of Hollins, that also provides access to Hollins University. From this interchange, the freeway comes into Botetourt County, where it becomes dedicated to Andrew Lewis once more, and reaches weigh stations serving both directions of the highway. Beyond the weigh station, I-81/US 220 crosses the Cloverdale Branch of Norfolk Southern Railway's Roanoke District rail line, prior to reaching an interchange with US 11 and northern terminus of US 220 Alt, which heads south toward the unincorporated city of Cloverdale, also providing access to the city of Lynchburg and the National D-Day Memorial via US 460, where northbound US 220 splits and heads north toward the town of Fincastle, the county seat of Botetourt County, southwest of the town of Troutville. The freeway continues through wooded areas, where it has interchanges SR 640 that provides access to the parallel US 11, after a southbound rest area and passing under US 11, with that route that provides an additional outlet to the Blue Ridge Parkway via SR 43, before crossing the James River, CSX Transportation's James River Subdivision, and SR 43, before reaching a southbound exit and northbound entrance to southbound US 11, northeast of the town of Buchanan. From here, northbound US 11 joins northbound I-81 in a concurrency to reach a full interchange with SR 614, located west of the unincorporated village of Arcadia.

Shortly after this point, the freeway enters Rockbridge County, where northbound US 11 splits at an interchange to the west of the unincorporated village of Natural Bridge, which it also provides access to the town of Glasgow via SR 130 and Natural Bridge State Park. I-81 continues northeast on its own alignment, reaching another interchange for US 11 before entering a steep incline, where the northbound direction gains a third climbing lane. The northbound climbing lane ends as the freeway prepares to interchange with US 60 between the independent cities of Lexington to the west and Buena Vista to the east and also provides access to Southern Virginia University, Washington and Lee University, and Virginia Military Institute campusses. Shortly past US 60, I-81 crosses the Maury River on a bridge dedicated to Master Trooper Jerry L. Hines, before coming to directional stack interchange at the southern junction with I-64, which heads west toward Charleston, West Virginia.

=== Lexington to Middletown ===
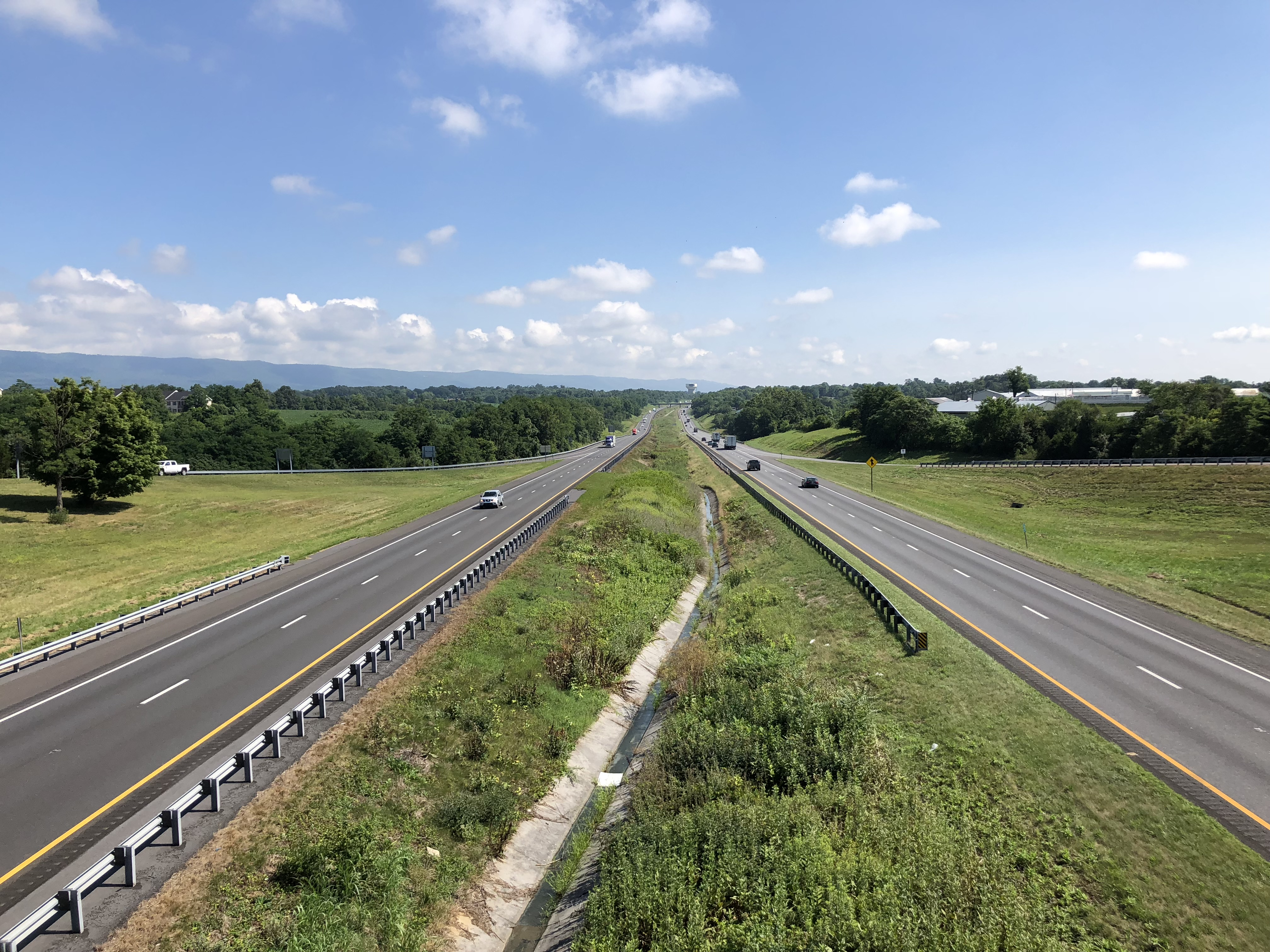
I-81 northbound in Woodstock

Past this interchange, eastbound I-64 joins northbound I-81 in a concurrency, where the freeway soon meets an interchange with US 11, a short distance to the northeast. The freeway gains a third northbound lane, before reaching a southbound rest area and an interchange with SR 710 in the unincorporated village of Fairfield, where the extra northbound lane disappears. After interchanging with SR 606 in the unincorporated village of Raphine, that also provides access to the Cyrus McCormick Farm, I-64/I-81 comes into Augusta County and the Shenandoah Battlefields National Historic District, before reaching the next exit at US 11, which provides access to the southern terminus of US 340 northeast of the unincorporated town of Greenville. The freeway continues to interchanges with SR 654 east of unincorporated village of Mint Spring and the southern terminus of SR 262, which also provides access to US 11, before coming a direction stack interchange with the northern junction of I-64, where that eastbound route splits from northbound I-81 and heads toward Richmond, the capital of the commonwealth of Virginia, also providing access to the Blue Ridge Parkway, Skyline Drive, and Shenandoah National Park, as well as the independent cities of Waynesboro and Charlottesville. Shortly past the split with I-64, I-81 becomes the eastern boundary of the independent city of Staunton, crosses over the Buckingham Branch Railroad's North Mountain Subdivision rail line, and reaches an interchange with US 250 that provides access to the Frontier Culture Museum and the Woodrow Wilson Presidential Library, as well as the campusses of the Virginia School for the Deaf and the Blind and Mary Baldwin University. Past US 250, the freeway becomes dedicated to John Lewis and meets an interchange with the northern terminus of the SR 262 loop, that also provides access to the town of Monterey, the county seat of adjacent Highland County via US 250 to the west. From here, I-81 fully comes back into Augusta County, where it interchanges with SR 612 in the unincorporated city of Verona, providing access to the Augusta Military Academy, passes a bidirectional rest area, crosses over the Roanoke District line, and meets another interchange with SR 256 in the unincorporated town of Weyers Cave, that also provides access Blue Ridge Community College and Shenandoah Valley Regional Airport, before it leaves Augusta County.

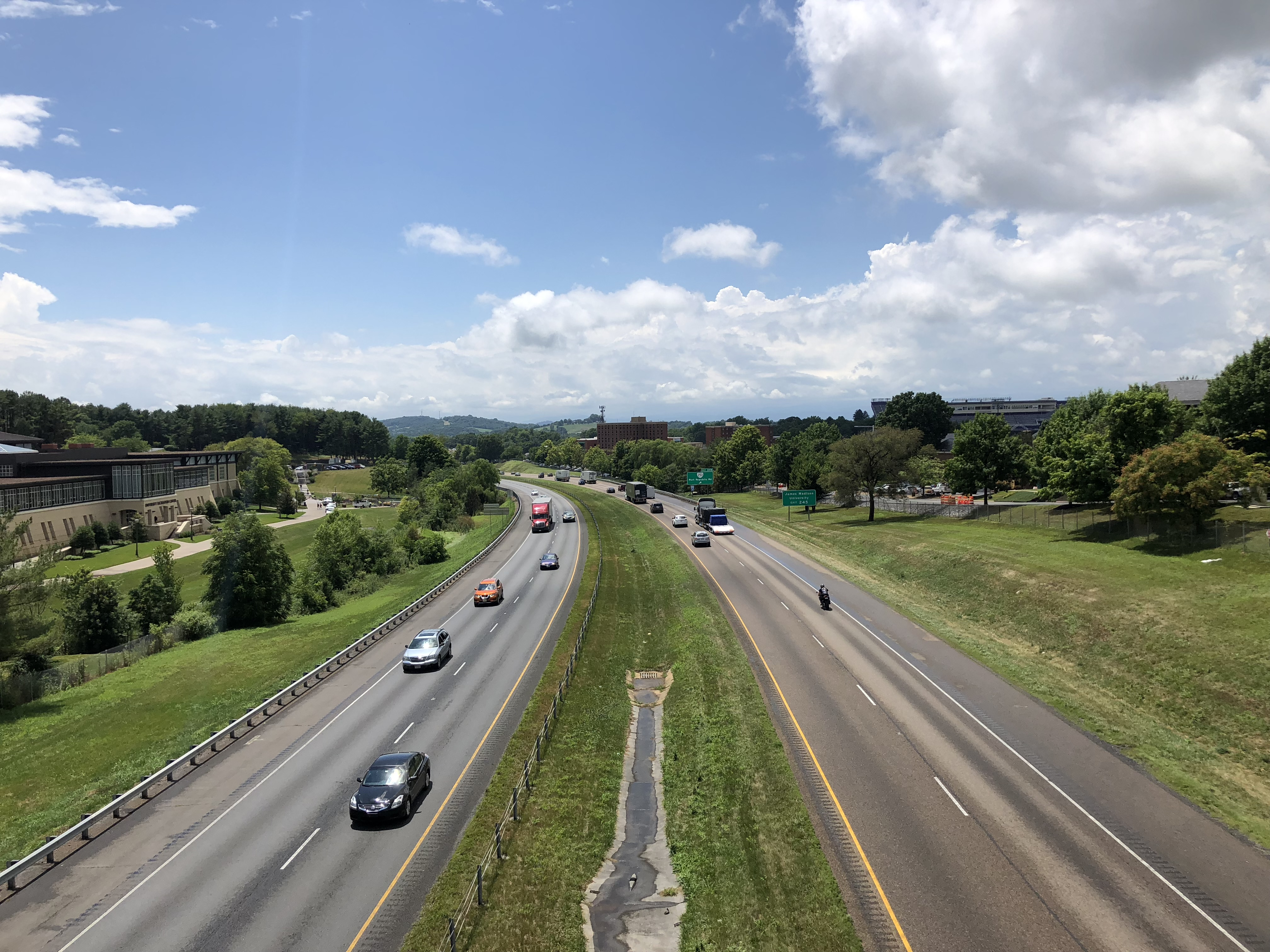
I-81 looking southbound near milepost 245 in Harrisonburg

The freeway enters Rockingham County, where it crosses the North River and meets SR 257/SR 682 at an interchange, east of the town of Mount Crawford that also provides access to Bridgewater College. From this point, I-81 enters commercial areas as it comes into the independent city of Harrisonburg and has its first interchange in that city with US 11 at a trumpet interchange. The freeway continues to cross over the Roanoke District's Chesapeake Western Branch rail line, interchange with SR 253 providing access to the downtown area of Harrisonburg and the James Madison University Convocation Center, before it passes along the southern edge of the campus of James Madison University and reaches an interchange with US 33 that provides another outlet to Skyline Drive and Shenandoah National Park, as well as to the campusses of the Harrisonburg Campus of the American National University and the Eastern Mennonite University. Just after this interchange, I-81 crosses over the Chesapeake Western Branch line again, before leaving Harrisonburg and reentering Rockingham County prior to reaching another trumpet interchange serving US 11. The freeway heads back into rural surroundings, where it meets another interchange with US 11, providing access to the southern terminus of SR 259 serving the towns of Broadway and Timberville, as well as the Endless Caverns site, in the hamlet of Mauzy. Afterward, I-81 continues northeast to another bidirectional rest area and then leaves Rockingham County.

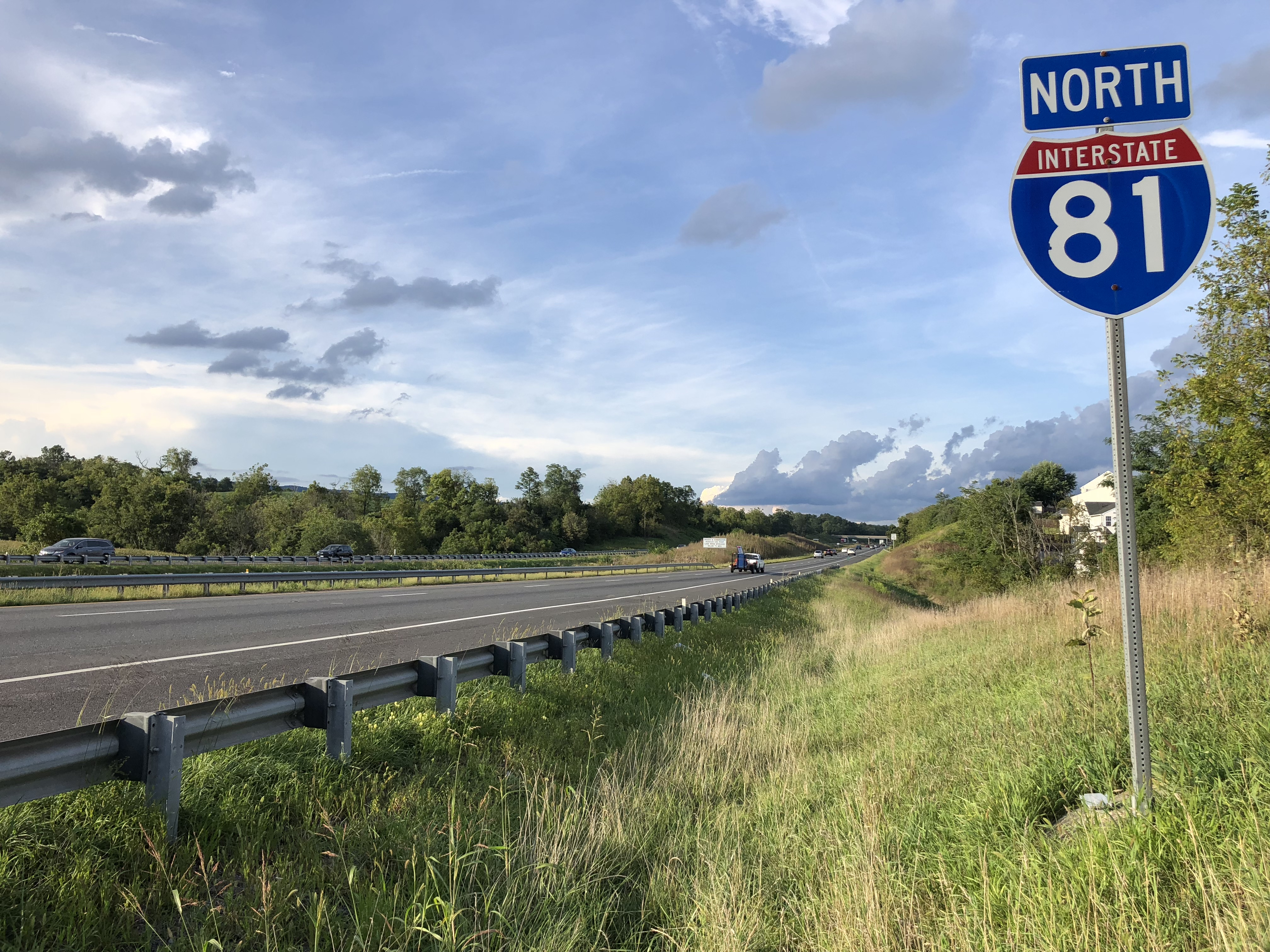
View north along I-81 just north of Exit 283 in Woodstock

The freeway comes into Shenandoah County and, a short distance later, interchanges with US 211 that provides an additional outlet to Skyline Drive and Shenandoah National Park, as well as the town of New Market, Luray Caverns, New Market Battlefield State Historical Park, and the Virginia Museum of the Civil War. I-81 crosses the North Fork of the Shenandoah River before its interchange with SR 730, that also provides access to US 11 and Shenandoah Caverns. The freeway passes through agricultural areas on the western edge of the town of Mount Jackson prior to crossing the Chesapeake Branch rail line, a tributary of the North Fork of the Shenandoah River, and SR 263, reaching an interchange with SR 292/SR 703 also providing access to the unincorporated city of Basye to the west, via SR 614 and SR 263. I-81 soon interchanges with SR 614 without a southbound exit and northbound entrance in the unincorporated village of Bowmans Crossing, SR 185/SR 675 near the town of Edinburg, providing access to Edinburg Mill, before interchanging with SR 42 within the town of Woodstock, the county seat of Shenandoah County, providing access to Massanutten Military Academy. I-81 continues northeast through wooded surroundings and interchanges with SR 651 northwest of the town of Toms Brook, before it turns more east and passes north of the town of Strasburg. Within the Strasburg area, the freeway interchanges US 48/SR 55, as well as US 11, which provides access to Cedar Creek and Belle Grove National Historical Park, before crossing over CSX Transportation's Shenandoah Subdivision rail line. I-81 then enters Warren County and turns back towards the northeast to its stack interchange with I-66 which heads east toward the town of Front Royal and Washington DC also providing access to the Virginia Inland Port, as well as additional access to Skyline Drive and Shenandoah National Park.

=== Middletown to West Virginia ===
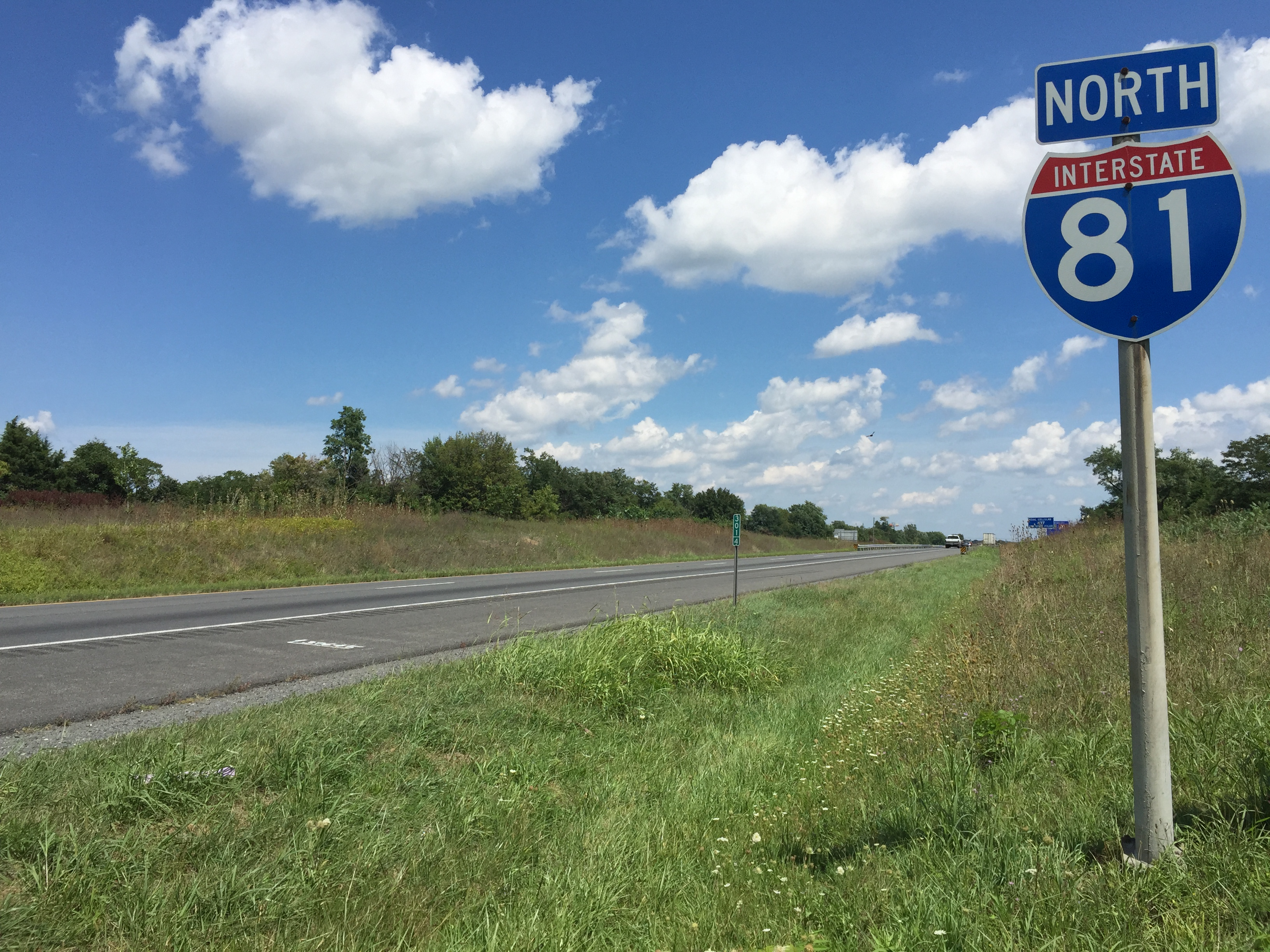
View north along I-81 north of I-66 in Frederick County

Within the I-66 interchange, I-81 enters Frederick County and meets SR 627 west of the unincorporated town of Middletown, that also provides access to Lord Fairfax Community College. Past this interchange, the freeway reaches a weigh station in both directions, before coming to an interchange with SR 277 on the eastern edge of the town of Stephens City, which also provides access to US 340. Soon, I-81 encounters the southern terminus of the SR 37 loop which leads to Romney, West Virginia, and Berkeley Springs, West Virginia, via connections with westbound US 50 and northbound US 522, respectively. SR 37 also provides access to US 11, SR 642, and the Museum of the Shenandoah Valley. From here, the freeway passes through areas of mixed development along the eastern boundary of the independent city of Winchester, reaching its next interchange with US 17, US 50, and US 522, providing access to the Stonewall Jackson's Headquarters Museum site, the campus of Shenandoah University, and the Apple Blossom Mall, the latter two of which are located at the two western corners of the interchange. On the northeastern edge of Winchester, I-81 interchanges with SR 7, which leads east toward the town of Berryville, the county seat of neighboring Clarke County. At this point, the freeway fully reenters Frederick County, as it meets an interchange with US 11, providing an additional outlet to westbound US 50 and northbound US 522, via a connection with the SR 37 loop. I-81 interchanges with SR 672 in the unincorporated village of Clear Brook, before reaching its last exit in the commonwealth of Virginia with SR 669, west of the unincorporated village of White Hall. Afterward, the freeway comes into the state of West Virginia and continues generally northeast toward the city of Martinsburg, the county seat of Berkeley County, which I-81 is completely within throughout its course in West Virginia.

== History ==
=== Planning and construction ===
The highway that is now I-81 had its origins in the late 1930s, when the federal government began planning for a national "superhighway" system. A 1939 report titled Toll Roads and Free Roads and published by the Bureau of Public Roads (BPR), the predecessor agency to the Federal Highway Administration (FHWA), recommended a controlled-access highway that would connect Bristol to Washington, D.C. The National Interregional Highway Committee's 1944 report, titled Interregional Highways, recommended that the route instead continue into West Virginia, and a separate route connect this route to Washington, D.C. Three years later, a plan produced by the Public Roads Administration of the now-defunct Federal Works Agency affirmed this recommendation. I-81 was one of the original Interstate Highways in Virginia authorized by the Federal-Aid Highway Act of 1956. The numbering was approved by the American Association of State Highway Officials (AASHO) on August 14, 1957.

The first section of I-81 in Virginia was the 3.9-mile-long (6.3 km) section from US 11/SR 100 to SR 99 in Pulaski, which opened on November 1, 1959. The 7.5-mile (12.1 km) section running between US 11 in Harrisonburg, referred to at the time as the Harrisonburg Bypass, was dedicated and opened on July 1, 1960. The five-mile (8.0 km) section spanning between US 11 around Buchanan known as the Buchanan Bypass was completed on December 23, 1960. On November 20, 1961, the 5.6-mile (9.0 km) section in Bristol between the Tennessee state line and US 11/19 known as the Bristol Bypass opened to traffic, along with I-381 and the northernmost one mile (1.6 km) in Tennessee. On June 28, 1962, the section between SR 611 and US 11/58, referred to as the Abingdon Bypass at the time, opened to traffic. The section between Fort Chiswell and US 11/SR 100 in Pulaski was completed in July 1962. The eight-mile (13 km) section between US 11/SR 645 in Seven Mile Ford and US 11 in Marion opened on June 28, 1963. On September 20, 1963, two noncontiguous sections; eight miles (13 km) between US 11 in Bristol and SR 611 near Abingdon and nine miles (14 km) between US 11/58 in Abingdon and SR 91 in Glade Spring; were opened. The five-mile (8.0 km) segment between US 11 in Marion and US 11 in Atkins opened on October 18, 1963. The following day, the 10-mile (16 km) section between SR 91 and US 11/SR 645 opened, completing I-81 between the Tennessee state line and Atkins. The 17-mile (27 km) section between US 11 in Atkins and US 11 in western Wytheville opened on November 1, 1964. On December 10, 1964, two lanes of the 7.7-mile (12.4 km) section between US 11 in Buchanan and US 11 near Natural Bridge opened. The 29-mile (47 km) section between SR 647 in Dixie Caverns west of Roanoke and US 11 near Buchanan opened on December 21, 1964.

On September 30, 1965, the six-mile (9.7 km) section spanning between US 11 in Wytheville opened. The 26-mile (42 km) section between US 11 in Strasburg and the West Virginia state line was dedicated and opened on November 4, 1965. On November 16, 1965, the 21-mile (34 km) section between SR 100 in Newbern and US 11/460 in Christiansburg was dedicated and opened to traffic. The northbound lanes of the section between US 11 in Harrisonburg and US 211 in New Market opened on December 23, 1965, and the southbound lanes opened on June 6, 1966. The eight-mile (13 km) segment between SR 256 in Weyers Cave and US 11 in Harrisonburg opened on November 15, 1966. The 33-mile (53 km) section between US/SR 211 in New Market and US 11 in Strasburg was dedicated and opened on December 8, 1966. On February 1, 1967, the 18.5-mile (29.8 km) section between US 11 north of Lexington and US 11 in Greenville opened. The 8.1-mile (13.0 km) segment between SR 612 in Verona and SR 256 in Weyers Cave opened on August 28, 1967. The 15-mile (24 km) section between US 11 in Fancy Hill and US 11 in Lexington opened on September 18, 1967. The two-mile (3.2 km) section between SR 262 in Staunton and SR 611 in Verona opened on June 10, 1968. On August 24, 1968, the 12-mile (19 km) section between US 11 in Greenville and SR 262 in Staunton was dedicated and opened. The last section of I-81 in Virginia, 14.4 miles (23.2 km) located between US 11/460 in Christiansburg and SR 647 near Dixie Caverns, was dedicated and opened on December 21, 1971.

=== Later history ===
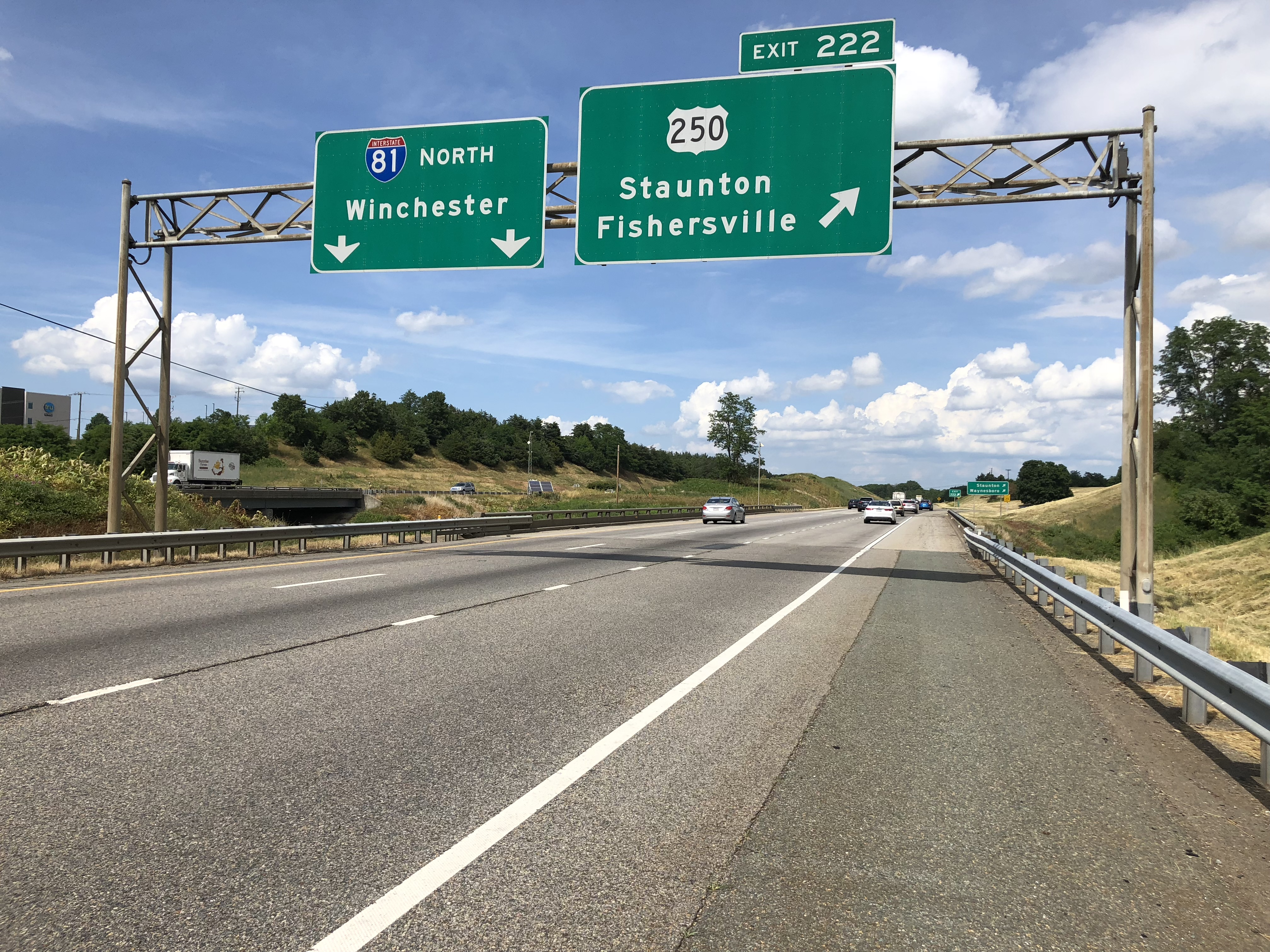
I-81 northbound near Staunton

The section through Wytheville concurrent with I-77, which reused a section of US 11/52 expanded to four lanes in the 1950s, did not initially meet Interstate Highway standards. On July 14, 1987, a ceremony was held to mark the completion of the upgrading of this section to Interstate Highway standards, which included new interchanges, widening of the route to six lanes, and paralleling frontage roads.

The state has proposed to widen its entire portion of I-81 to a minimum of three or four lanes in each direction to accommodate increased truck traffic and to toll nonpassenger vehicles. Some sections of the new widened highway may completely separate car and truck traffic.

On January 8, 2019, Governor Ralph Northam and Republican lawmakers agreed to a plan to add tolls to I-81 in Virginia in order to fund improvements to I-81 and parallel routes that would reduce traffic jams. I-81 would have used all-electronic tolling, with toll gantries every 40 to 60 miles (64 to 97 km) and a toll rate of $0.11 per mile ($0.068/km) for cars and $0.17 per mile ($0.11/km) for trucks; an annual pass would have been available for $30. Tolls would have been discounted during the overnight hours. This plan faced opposition from business and trucking groups, fearing economic hardship. On January 31, 2019, lawmakers rejected the plan and decided to seek other funding sources.

== Exit list ==
County	Location	mi	km	Exit	Destinations	Notes
City of Bristol		0.00	0.00		I-81 south – Kingsport, Knoxville	Continuation into Tennessee
City of Bristol		0.9	1.4	1	US 58 west / US 421 – Bristol, Gate City	Southern end of US 58 concurrency; signed as exits 1A (south) and 1B (north/west) southbound
City of Bristol		3.2	5.1	3	I-381 south – Bristol	Northern terminus and exits 1A-B on I-381
City of Bristol		5.6	9.0	5	US 11 / US 19 (Lee Highway)	
City of Bristol		7.4	11.9	7	Old Airport Road / Bonham Road	Former SR 76
Washington		10.3	16.6	10	US 11 / US 19 (Lee Highway)	Access via SR F310
Washington		13.6	21.9	13	SR 611 / Lee Highway (US 11 / US 19)	Access to Virginia Highlands Airport
Washington	Abingdon	14.4	23.2	14	SR 140 to US 19 – Abingdon	Access to Virginia Highlands Community College
Washington	Abingdon	17.6	28.3	17	US 58 Alt. / SR 75 – Abingdon, South Holston Dam	
Washington		19.5	31.4	19	US 11 / US 58 east – Abingdon, Damascus	North end of US 58 concurrency
Washington		22.2	35.7	22	SR 704 (Enterprise Road)	
Washington		24.7	39.8	24	SR 80 – Meadowview	
Washington		26.4	42.5	26	SR 737 – Emory	Access to Emory and Henry University
Washington	Old Glade Spring	29.5	47.5	29	SR 91 – Damascus, Glade Spring	
Washington		32.1	51.7	32	US 11 (Lee Highway) – Chilhowie	
Smyth	Chilhowie	35.7	57.5	35	SR 107 north – Chilhowie	Southern terminus of SR 107; former SR 79
Smyth	Seven Mile Ford	39.3	63.2	39	US 11 / SR 645 – Seven Mile Ford	
Smyth		44.1	71.0	44	US 11 – Marion	
Smyth	Marion	44.9	72.3	45	SR 16 – Marion	
Smyth	Mount Carmel	47.3	76.1	47	US 11 – Marion	
Smyth	Atkins	50.4	81.1	50	US 11 – Atkins	
Smyth		54.3	87.4	54	SR 683 – Groseclose	Access to Mountain Empire Airport
Wythe		60.6	97.5	60	SR 90 south – Rural Retreat	Northern terminus of SR 90
Wythe		67.4	108.5	67	US 11 – Wytheville	Northbound exit and southbound entrance
Wythe	Wytheville	70.4	113.3	70	US 21 south / US 52 north – Wytheville	Southern end of US 52 concurrency; northern terminus of US 21
Wythe	Wytheville	72.6	116.8	72	I-77 north – Bluefield, Charleston, WV	Southern end of I-77 concurrency; exit 40 on I-77
Wythe	Wytheville	73.6	118.4	73	US 11 south – Wytheville	Southern end of US 11 concurrency
Wythe		77.4	124.6	77	SR F042 (Chapman Road) / SR F043 (East Lee Highway)	
Wythe	Fort Chiswell	80.2	129.1	80	US 52 south / SR 121 north – Fort Chiswell, Max Meadows	Northern end of US 52 concurrency; southern terminus of SR 121
Wythe		81.6	131.3	81	I-77 south – Charlotte, NC	Northern end of I-77 concurrency; exit 32 on I-77
Wythe		84.5	136.0	84	SR 619 – Grahams Forge	
Wythe		86.6	139.4	86	SR F044 (East Lee Highway) / SR F045 (Topaz Drive)	
Pulaski		89.5	144.0	89	US 11 north / SR 100 south – Pulaski, Hillsville	Northern end of US 11 concurrency; southern end of SR 100 concurrency; signed as exits 89A (south) and 89B (north)
Pulaski	Draper	92.4	148.7	92	SR 658 – Draper	
Pulaski	McAdam	94.7	152.4	94	SR 99 north / Service Road (SR F047) – Pulaski	Signed as exits 94A (Service Road) and 94B (SR 99) northbound; southern terminus of SR 99
Pulaski	Newbern	98.1	157.9	98	SR 100 north – Dublin, Pearisburg	Northern end of SR 100 concurrency
Pulaski		101.4	163.2	101	SR 660 – Claytor Lake State Park	
Montgomery		105.4	169.6	105	SR 232 / SR 605 – Radford	Southern terminus of SR 232
Montgomery		109.6	176.4	109	SR 177 north / SR 600 – Radford	Southern terminus of SR 177
Montgomery	Christiansburg	113.9	183.3	114	SR 8 – Christiansburg, Floyd	
Montgomery	Christiansburg	118.4– 119.0	190.5– 191.5	118	US 460 Bus. west / US 11 / US 460 / Parkway Drive – Christiansburg, Blacksburg, Shawsville, Elliston	Signed as exits 118A (Parkway), 118B (US 460 west), and 118C (US 11/US 460 east/US 460 Bus.)
Montgomery		128.4	206.6	128	SR 603 – Ironto	
Roanoke		132.1	212.6	132	SR 647 – Dixie Caverns	
City of Salem		137.6	221.4	137	SR 112 / SR 619 – Salem	
City of Salem		140.4	226.0	140	SR 311 – Salem, New Castle	
Roanoke	Hanging Rock	141.2	227.2	141	SR 419 to SR 311 north – Salem, New Castle	
City of Roanoke		143.4	230.8	143	Future I-73 south / I-581 south / US 220 south – Airport, Roanoke	Directional T interchange; southern end of US 220 concurrency; northern terminus and exits 1N-S on I-581
City of Roanoke		146.4	235.6	146	SR 115 – Hollins, Cloverdale, Roanoke	Northern terminus of SR 115
Botetourt		150.3	241.9	150	US 11 / US 220 north / US 220A south to US 460 – Troutville, Daleville, Fincastle, Cloverdale	Signed as exits 150A (south) and 150B (north); northern end of US 220 concurrency
Botetourt		156.4	251.7	156	SR 640 to US 11 – Troutville	
Botetourt		162.6	261.7	162	US 11 – Buchanan	
Botetourt		167.3	269.2	167	US 11 south – Buchanan	Former southern end of US 11 concurrency; southbound exit and northbound entrance; closed in October 2020
Botetourt		168.4	271.0	168	US 11 south / SR 614 – Arcadia	Southern end of US 11 concurrency
Rockbridge		175.4	282.3	175	US 11 north – Natural Bridge	Northern end of US 11 concurrency
Rockbridge	Fancy Hill	180.5	290.5	180	US 11 – Fancy Hill, Natural Bridge, Glasgow	Signed as exits 180A (south) and 180B (north) southbound
Rockbridge		188.7	303.7	188	US 60 – Lexington, Buena Vista	Signed as exits 188A (east) and 188B (west)
Rockbridge		191.3	307.9	191	I-64 west – Lexington, Charleston	Southern end of I-64 concurrency; exit 56 on I-64
Rockbridge		195.6	314.8	195	US 11 (Lee Highway) – Lexington	
Rockbridge	Fairfield	200.2	322.2	200	SR 710 – Fairfield	
Rockbridge	Raphine	205.6	330.9	205	SR 606 – Raphine, Steeles Tavern	To SR 56
Augusta		213.4	343.4	213	US 11 to US 340 – Greenville	Signed as exits 213A (south) and 213B (north) southbound
Augusta	Mint Spring	217.2	349.5	217	SR 654 – Mint Spring, Stuarts Draft	
Augusta	Jolivue	220.1	354.2	220	SR 262 to US 11 – Staunton	Southern terminus of SR 262
Augusta		221.4	356.3	221	I-64 east – Richmond	Northern end of I-64 concurrency; exit 87 on I-64
Augusta	Peyton	222.2	357.6	222	US 250 – Staunton, Fishersville	
Augusta		225.1	362.3	225	SR 262 (Woodrow Wilson Parkway) – Staunton	
Augusta	Verona	227.6	366.3	227	SR 612 – Verona	
Augusta	Weyers Cave	234.9	378.0	235	SR 256 – Weyers Cave, Grottoes	
Rockingham		240.5	387.0	240	SR 257 west / SR 682 – Mount Crawford, Bridgewater	Eastern terminus of SR 257
City of Harrisonburg		243.1	391.2	243	US 11 – Harrisonburg	
City of Harrisonburg		245.6	395.3	245	SR 253 (Port Republic Road)	
City of Harrisonburg		247.5	398.3	247	US 33 – Harrisonburg, Elkton	Signed as exits 247A (east) and 247B (west)
Rockingham		251.1	404.1	251	US 11 – Harrisonburg	
Rockingham	Mauzy	257.0	413.6	257	US 11 / SR 259 north – Mauzy, Broadway, Timberville	Southern terminus of SR 259
Shenandoah	New Market	264.6	425.8	264	US 211 east / SR 211 west – New Market, Timberville, Luray	SR 211 not signed
Shenandoah		268.8	432.6	269	SR 730 to US 11 – Shenandoah Caverns, Mount Jackson	
Shenandoah		273.4	440.0	273	SR 292 / SR 703 – Mount Jackson, Basye	
Shenandoah	Bowmans Crossing	277.2	446.1	277	SR 614 – Bowmans Crossing	Northbound exit and southbound entrance
Shenandoah		279.6	450.0	279	SR 185 / SR 675 – Edinburg	
Shenandoah	Woodstock	283.4	456.1	283	SR 42 – Woodstock	
Shenandoah		291.1	468.5	291	SR 651 – Toms Brook	
Shenandoah		296.7	477.5	296	US 48 west / SR 55 – Strasburg	Eastern terminus of US 48
Shenandoah		298.3	480.1	298	US 11 – Strasburg	
Warren	No major junctions					
Frederick		300.6	483.8	300	I-66 east – Front Royal, Washington	Directional T interchange; western terminus and exits 1A-B on I-66
Frederick		302.3	486.5	302	SR 627 – Middletown	
Frederick	Stephens City	307.3	494.6	307	SR 277 to US 340 – Stephens City	
Frederick	Winchester	309.9	498.7	310	SR 37 north to US 50 west / US 522 north / US 11 / SR 642 – Romney, Berkeley Springs, Kernstown	
Frederick	Winchester	313.4	504.4	313	US 17 / US 50 / US 522 – Winchester	Signed as exits 313A (south/east) and 313B (north/west) southbound
Frederick	Winchester	314.9	506.8	315	SR 7 – Winchester, Berryville	
Frederick	Winchester	317.8	511.4	317	US 11 to SR 37 / US 522 north / US 50 west – Winchester, Stephenson	
Frederick	Clear Brook	321.6	517.6	321	SR 672 – Clear Brook, Brucetown	
Frederick	Rest	323.9	521.3	323	SR 669 to US 11 – Whitehall	
Frederick		324.92	522.91		I-81 north – Martinsburg	Continuation into West Virginia
1.000 mi = 1.609 km; 1.000 km = 0.621 mi: Concurrency terminus; Incomplete access

== Auxiliary routes ==
Interstate	City	Notes
Interstate 381	Bristol	
Interstate 581	Roanoke	Concurrent with US 220, future route of I-73

== See also ==
- George Washington and Jefferson National Forests

Interstate 81
Previous state: Tennessee	Virginia	Next state: West Virginia
