= Mountain Empire Airport =

Airport in Virginia, United States

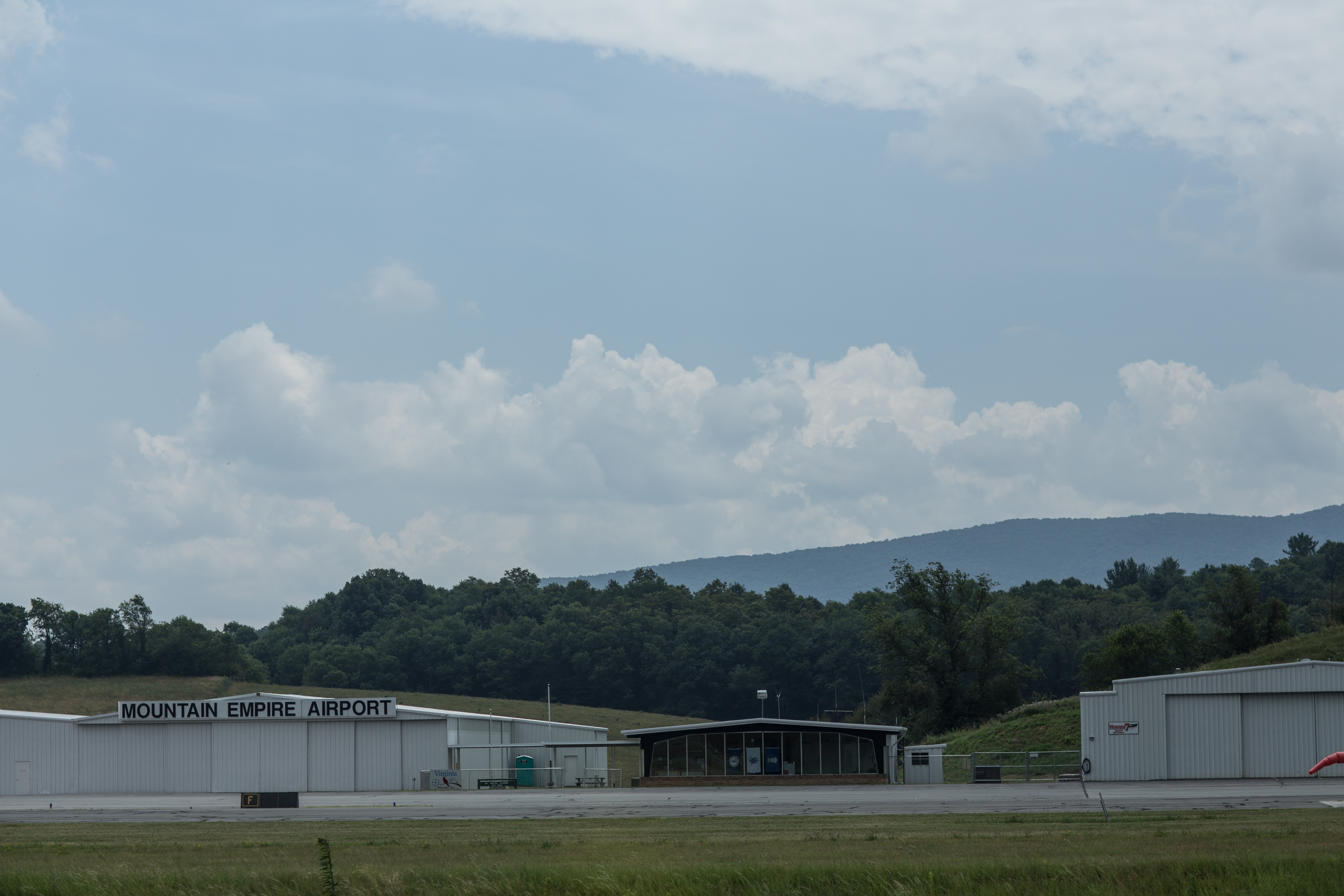
- IATA: none; ICAO: KMKJ; FAA LID: MKJ

Summary
- Airport type: Public
- Owner: Smyth Wythe Airport Commission
- Serves: Marion / Wytheville, Virginia
- Elevation AMSL: 2,558 ft (780 m)
- Coordinates: 36°53′42″N 081°20′59″W

Map
- Location of airport in Virginia

Runways
Direction	Length		Surface
Direction	ft	m	Surface
8/26	5,252	1,601	Asphalt

Statistics (2009)
- Aircraft operations: 10,405
- Based aircraft: 25
- Source: Federal Aviation Administration

Mountain Empire Airport (ICAO: KMKJ, FAA LID: MKJ) is a public use airport in Smyth County, Virginia, United States. It located nine nautical miles (10 mi, 17 km) northeast of the central business district of Marion (in Smyth County) and 13 nautical miles (15 mi; 24 km) west of Wytheville (in Wythe County). The airport is situated between Interstate 81 and U.S. Route 11 (Lee Highway), near Groseclose. It is owned by Smyth Wythe Airport Commission.

This airport was included in the National Plan of Integrated Airport Systems for 2011–2015, which categorized it as a general aviation facility. Although many U.S. airports use the same three-letter location identifier for the FAA and IATA, this airport is assigned MKJ by the FAA but has no designation from the IATA (which assigned MKJ to Makoua Airport in Makoua, Republic of the Congo).

== Facilities and aircraft ==
Mountain Empire Airport covers an area of 120 acres (49 ha) at an elevation of 2,558 feet (780 m) above mean sea level. It has one runway designated 8/26 with an asphalt surface measuring 5,252 by 75 feet (1,601 by 23 m).

For the 12-month period ending June 30, 2009, the airport had 10,405 aircraft operations, an average of 28 per day: 98% general aviation and 2% military. At that time there were 25 aircraft based at this airport: 92% single-engine, 4% multi-engine, and 4% helicopter.
