= VA-185 =

VA185 or VA-185 may refer to:

- Attack Squadron 185 (U.S. Navy)
- State Road 185 (Virginia)
