= Chapel Hill (Mint Spring, Virginia) =

Historic house in Virginia, United States

- U.S. National Register of Historic Places
- Virginia Landmarks Register
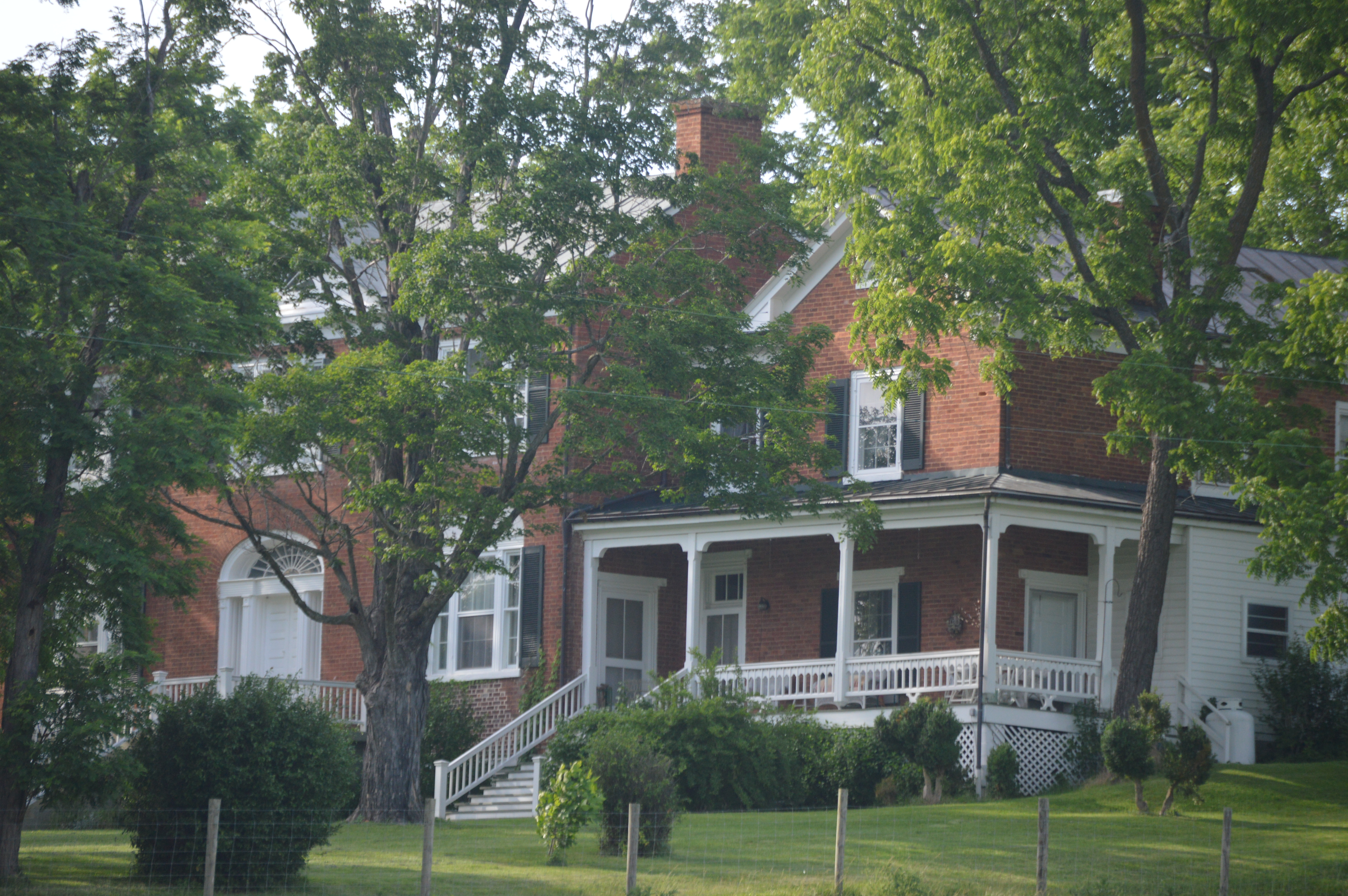
- Front of the house, with late-19th-century wing visible at right

- Location within Virginia Location within the United States
- Location: White Hill Road southeast of Mint Spring, Virginia
- Coordinates: 38°4′01″N 79°04′23″W
- Area: 50 acres (20 ha)
- Built: c. 1834
- Architectural style: Federal
- NRHP reference No.: 78003006
- VLR No.: 007-0012

Significant dates
- Added to NRHP: November 16, 1978
- Designated VLR: July 18, 1978

Chapel Hill is a historic home located near Mint Spring, Augusta County, Virginia. It was built about 1834, and is a two-story, three-bay, brick I-house dwelling in the Federal style. A matching ell to one end was added in the 1890s and a small addition was added behind the house in the mid-20th century.

It was listed on the National Register of Historic Places in 1978.

== History and description ==
John Knight Churchman purchased the property in 1826 and construction of the house was completed by 1834 when it was noted in the county tax records. He named the house after the (now destroyed) Episcopal chapel was on his property at that time. As of 1978, the house still remained in the hands of his descendants.

"The original section of Chapel Hill is a three-bay, single-pile structure built of brick laid in Flemish bond on the facade and in five-course American bond on the ends and on the rear. The front facade features a central pedimented pavilion with an elliptical fanlight over the doorway and another in the pediment. The doorway also incorporates sidelights with wooden interlaced mullions within its symmetrically molded frame. The lintel over the door and sidelights consists of six plain fascia bands, each corbelled out slightly beyond the one below. All of the windows on the two long sides are triple windows with 6/6 sash flanked by 2/2 sidelights. The interior features French scenic wallpaper, graining and marbleizing."

"At the end of the 19th century, a two-story brick wing was added to the east end of the house. Set with its gable to the front of the house and recessed from the facade of the main block, it has a double-pile, side-hall plan. There is no decoration of note on the interior, but there was once a Classical portico, since replaced, carried across the front. In the re-entrant angle created by the juxtaposition of these two blocks, a one-story, shed-roofed brick ell accommodating a kitchen and a dining room was added in the mid-20th century. Also on the property are an associated frame office with some Gothic details, a pyramidal-roofed frame smokehouse, and a gable-roofed dairy".
