= Clover Mount =

Historic house in Virginia, United States

- U.S. National Register of Historic Places
- Virginia Landmarks Register
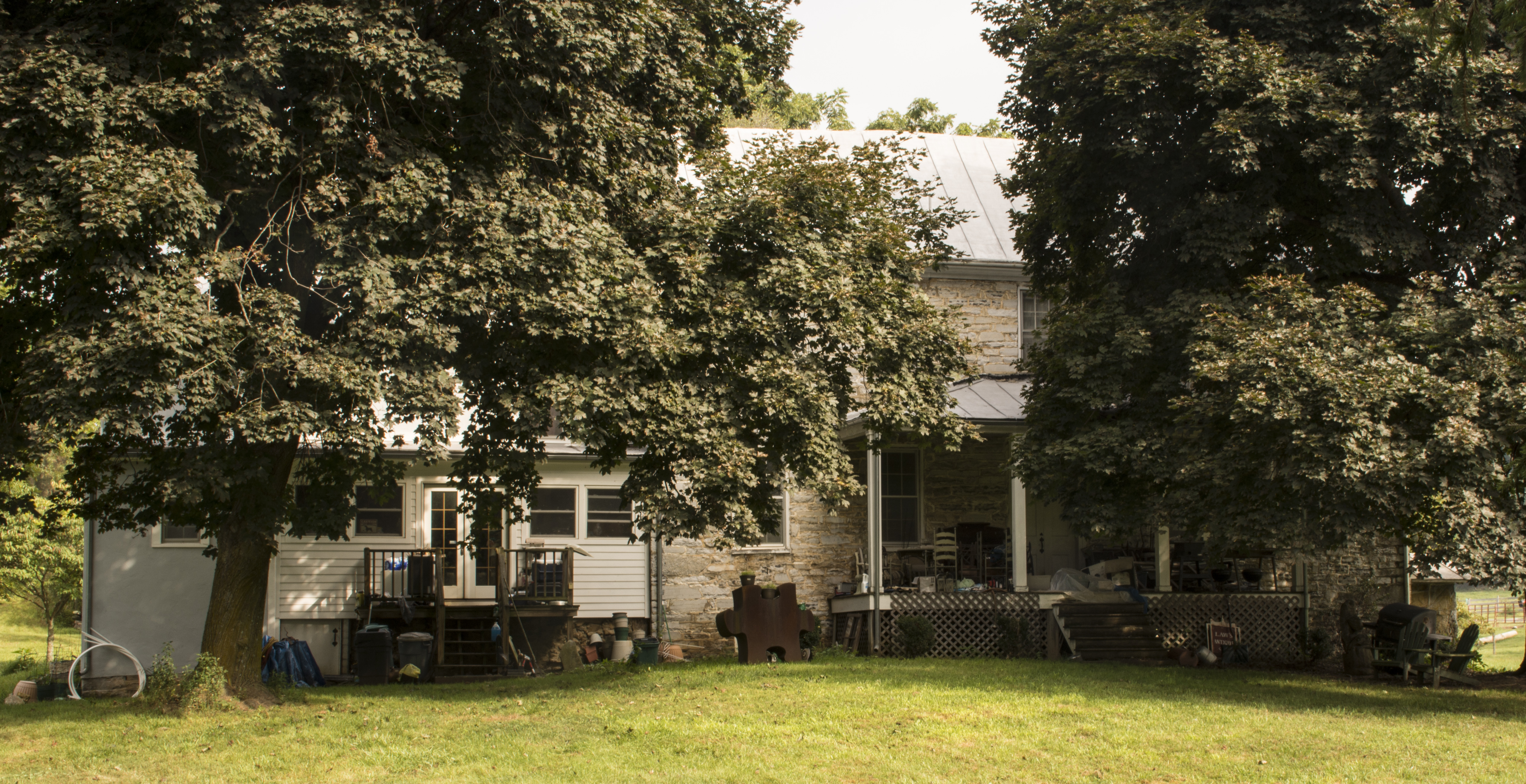

- Location within Virginia Location within the United States
- Location: West of Greenville on VA 674, near Greenville, Virginia
- Coordinates: 37.99969°N 79.20641°W
- Area: 8 acres (3.2 ha)
- Built: c. 1790, 1803
- NRHP reference No.: 82004540
- VLR No.: 007-0606

Significant dates
- Added to NRHP: September 16, 1982
- Designated VLR: June 16, 1981

Clover Mount, also known as Tate House and Stone House Farm, is a historic home located near Greenville, Augusta County, Virginia. The house dates to the late-18th century and is a two-story, five-bay, cut limestone dwelling built in two stages and completed before 1803. Extensive decorative stenciling dating back to the early 19th century was discovered during restoration work in the 1970s and 1980s.

It was listed on the National Register of Historic Places in 1982.

== History and description ==
The land that the house sits on was purchased by Robert Tate in 1775. When it was constructed is unknown, although an insurance assessment done in 1803 described it as decayed and in bad repair. This suggests that it may have been built about 1790. The original section was built on a two-room, hall-parlor plan, and measured 30 by 20 feet (9.1 by 6.1 m); only the north rooms had fireplaces. By 1803 a single-cell, double-pile extension had been added to it. This converted the house into a variation of a I-house with the former south rooms converted into the central hallway. The extension had corner fireplaces in its rooms. Restoration work in the 1970s and 1980s "uncovered early 19th-century stenciling below the wallpaper in seven rooms. This is a rare, but very extensive, survival of stenciling in the Valley of Virginia. Initial work has suggested that this decoration is found in the passages and south rooms on both floors and the second-floor north chamber; the first-floor north room apparently retained whitewashed plaster walls.

The 1805 insurance assessment reveals that a new kitchen 6 feet (1.8 m) away from the house had been added. "A two-story stuccoed ell was added to the house around 1900. Although this retains the usual local plan--two rooms with a wide porch--it was added in a different location, as a lateral extension rather than to the rear. The room directly off the main house served as the dining room and the one behind as the kitchen. A wide chimney with a fireplace opening into the kitchen and with an adjoining pass-through cupboard create the central partition in this addition. A side porch connects these two rooms and the pantry. Also on the property is an associated frame bank barn with heavy mortise-and-tenon construction."
