= Virginia State Route 90 =

State highway in Wythe County, Virginia, US

State Route 90
- Main Street

Route information
- Maintained by VDOT
- Length: 1.73 mi (2.78 km)
- Existed: 1933–present
- Tourist routes: Virginia Byway

Major junctions
- West end: I-81 / SR 680 in Rural Retreat
- US 11 in Rural Retreat
- East end: SR 616 / SR 749 in Rural Retreat

Location
- Country: United States
- State: Virginia
- Counties: Wythe

Highway system
- Virginia Routes; Interstate; US; Primary; Secondary; Byways; History; HOT lanes
← SR 89	→ SR 91

State Route 90 (SR 90) is a primary state highway in the U.S. state of Virginia. Known as Main Street, the state highway runs 1.73 miles (2.78 km) from SR 616 and SR 749 north to Interstate 81 (I-81) within Rural Retreat in western Wythe County. SR 90 connects Rural Retreat with I-81 and U.S. Route 11 (US 11).

== Route description ==
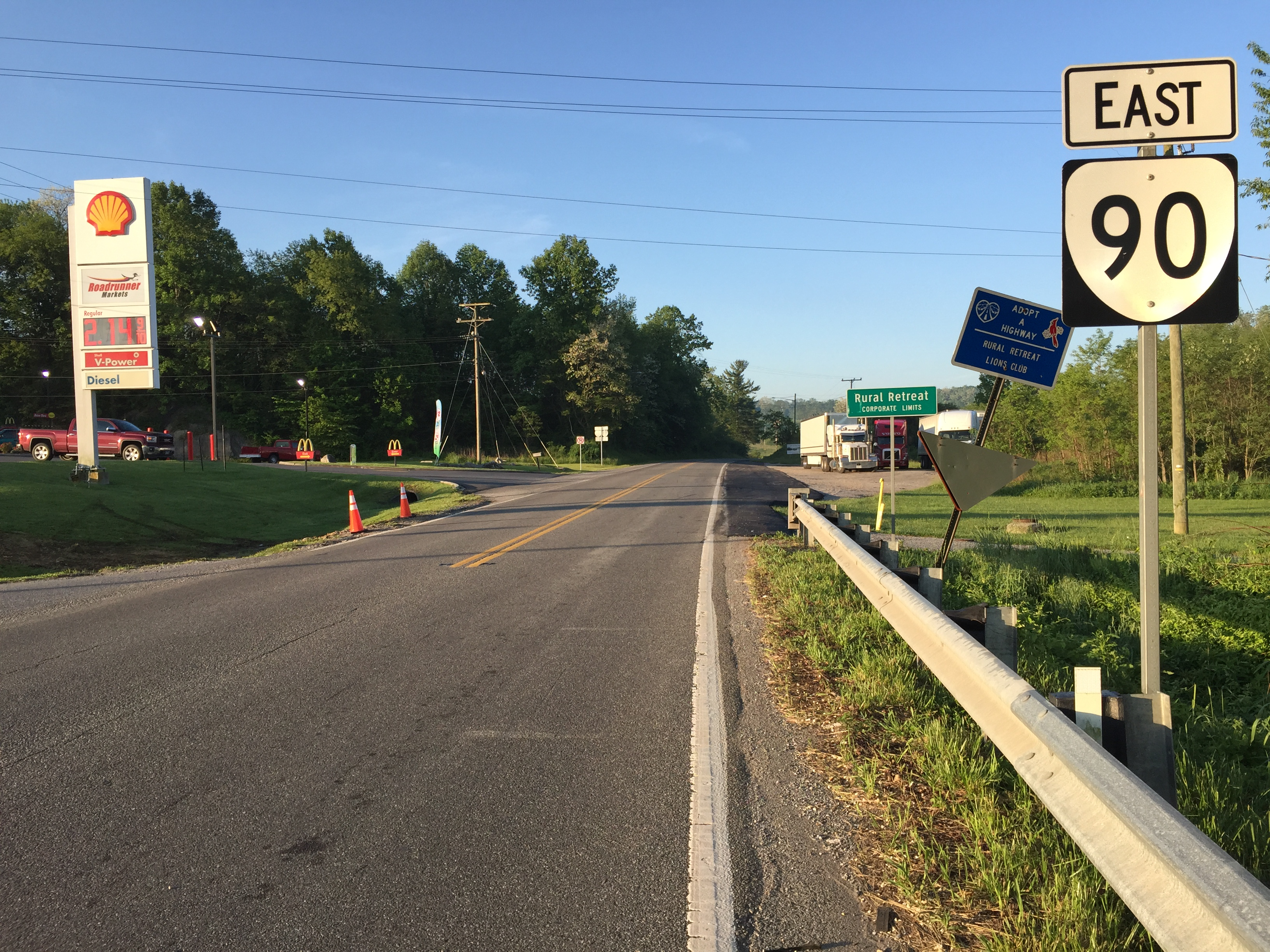
View south at the north end of SR 90 at I-81 in Rural Retreat

SR 90's southern terminus is at the center of the town of Rural Retreat at the intersection of Main Street and Baumgardner Avenue. Main Street continues south as SR 749 and Baumgardner Avenue is SR 616 in both directions. The state highway heads north and has a grade crossing of Norfolk Southern Railway's Pulaski District. SR 90 leaves the town limits and intersects US 11 (Lee Highway) at Staley Crossroads. The state highway continues to its northern terminus at the southbound ramps of its diamond interchange with I-81. The roadway continues north as SR 680 (Blacklick Road).

=== History ===
From about 1946 to 1952, this route ran from U.S. Route 21 in Speedwell, down what is now SR 749 into Rural Retreat, then down what is now SR 680, Blacklick Road, to U.S. Route 52 in Favonia, although the portion in between what is now U.S. 11 and I-81 was not part of the road until 1980. This routing also briefly took the road through Smyth County, and may explain why it is still signed as an east-west route even though it currently runs fully north-south.

== Major intersections ==
The entire route is in Wythe County.

Location	mi	km	Destinations	Notes
	0.00	0.00	I-81 / SR 680 (Black Lick Road) – Wytheville, Marion	Exit 60 (I-81); western terminus
Rural Retreat	0.47	0.76	US 11 (West Lee Highway) – Wytheville, Marion	
Rural Retreat	1.73	2.78	SR 616 (Baumgardner Avenue) / SR 749 (South Main Street)	Eastern terminus
1.000 mi = 1.609 km; 1.000 km = 0.621 mi
