= Virginia State Route 232 =

State highway in Virginia, United States

State Route 232
- Main Street

Route information
- Maintained by VDOT
- Length: 4.33 mi (6.97 km)
- Existed: 1968–present

Major junctions
- South end: I-81 near Radford
- North end: US 11 in Radford

Location
- Country: United States
- State: Virginia
- Counties: Montgomery, City of Radford

Highway system
- Virginia Routes; Interstate; US; Primary; Secondary; Byways; History; HOT lanes
← SR 231	→ SR 233

State Route 232 (SR 232) is a primary state highway in the U.S. state of Virginia. Known as Main Street, the state highway runs 4.33 miles (6.97 km) from Interstate 81 (I-81) near Radford to U.S. Route 11 (US 11) in Radford. SR 232 functions as a spur from the Interstate into the western part of the independent city of Radford.

== Route description ==
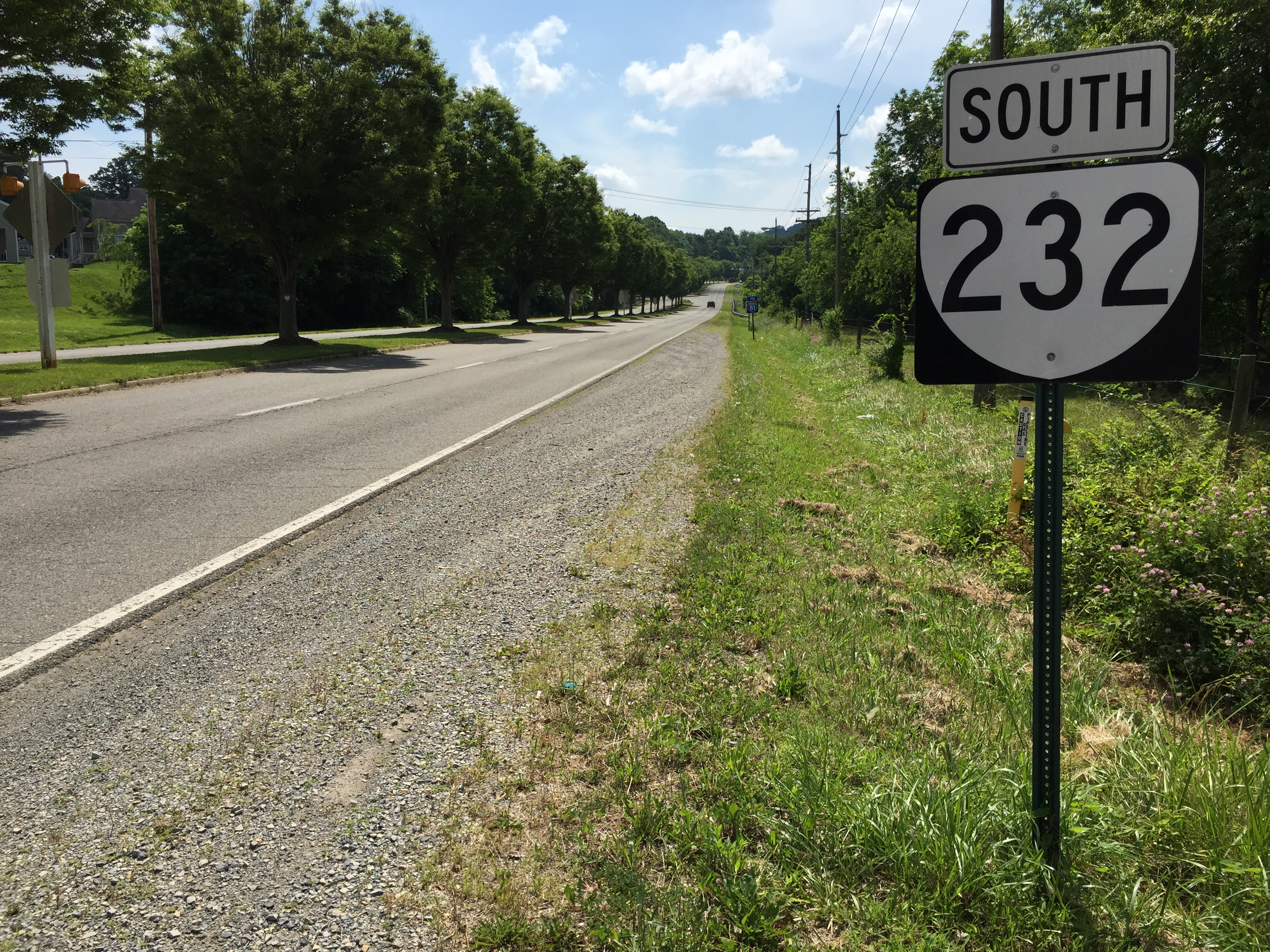
View south along SR 232 in Radford

SR 232 begins at an interchange with I-81 just east of the Interstate's bridge over the New River just south of Radford in Montgomery County. The interchange consists of a half-trumpet with northbound I-81 and a pair of ramps—one straight and one loop—with southbound I-81. SR 232 enters the city of Radford at its intersection with SR 605 (Little River Road), which follows the river south to its impoundment, Claytor Lake. The state highway heads north as a four-lane divided highway through an S-curve, then reduces to a two-lane undivided road at the southern edge of the city's street grid at Highland Avenue. SR 232 heads straight north as the main commercial street of the city. The state highway gradually curves to the northeast before reaching its northern terminus at US 11. Main Street continues east as US 11 toward the eastern part of Radford; US 11 also heads north as Lee Highway to cross the New River into Pulaski County.

== Major intersections ==
County	Location	mi	km	Destinations	Notes
Montgomery		0.00	0.00	I-81 – Roanoke, Bristol	Exit 105 (I-81); southern terminus
Montgomery				SR 605 south (Little River Dam Road) – Snowville	
City of Radford		4.33	6.97	US 11 (East Main Street) – Speedway	Northern terminus
1.000 mi = 1.609 km; 1.000 km = 0.621 mi
