= Bethel Green =

Historic house in Virginia, United States

- U.S. National Register of Historic Places
- Virginia Landmarks Register
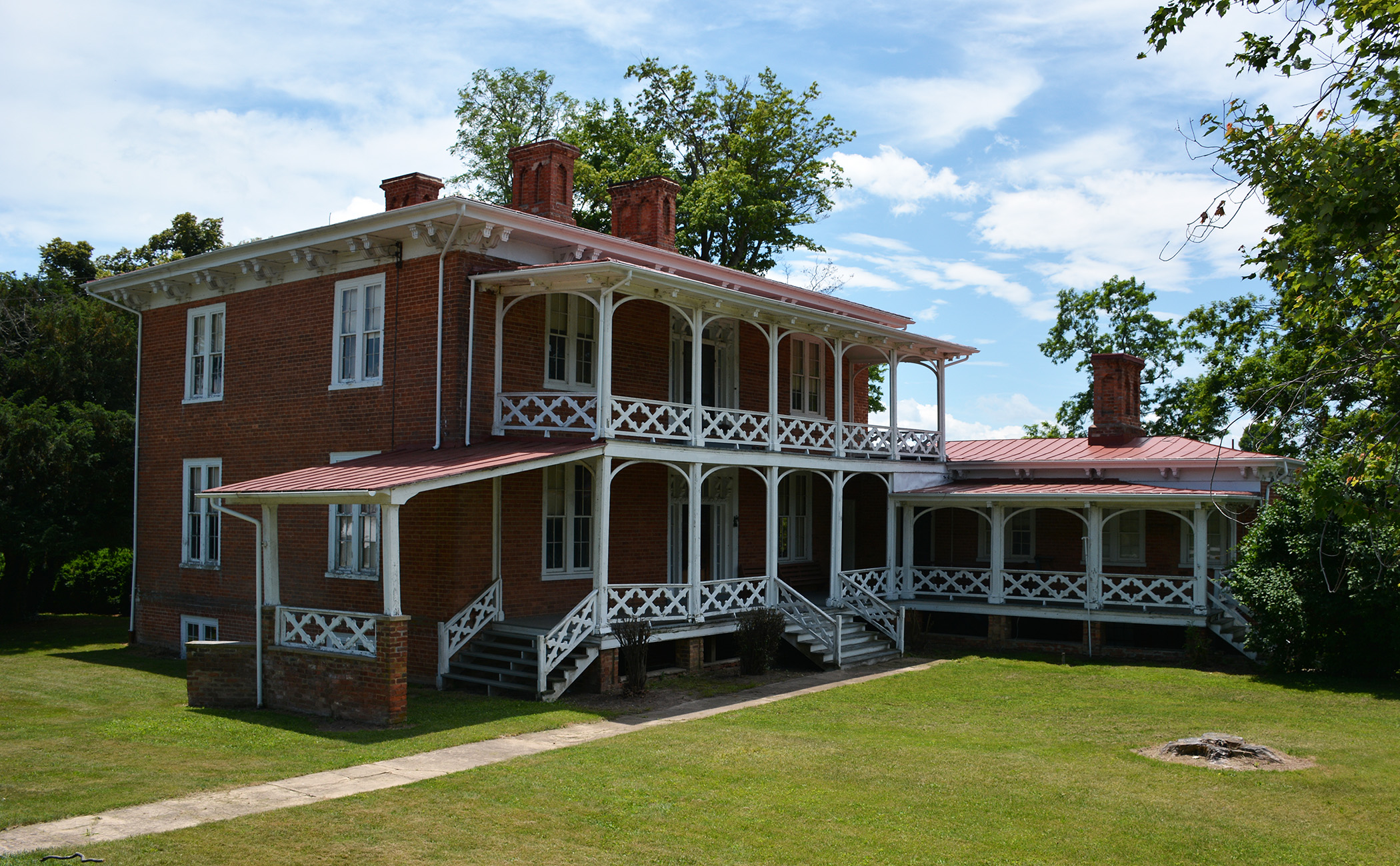

- Location within Virginia Location within the United States
- Location: Rte. 701, near Greenville, Virginia
- Coordinates: 38°2′31″N 79°10′34″W
- Area: 21 acres (8.5 ha)
- Built: 1857
- Built by: Brown, Jonathan
- NRHP reference No.: 82004539
- VLR No.: 007-0126

Significant dates
- Added to NRHP: August 26, 1982
- Designated VLR: May 18, 1982

Bethel Green, also known as the James Bumgardner House, is a historic home located near Greenville, Augusta County, Virginia, "essentially undisturbed since its completion in 1857. Although the basic house is conservative with its straightforward double-pile Georgian plan, such embellishments as its Gothic-style porches, fancy chimney stacks, and Italianate-bracketed cornice make Bethel Green a stylish amalgam of contemporary architectural modes. Of exceptional interest is the Victorian interior, especially the parlors, which preserve their original textiles, furniture, and other decorations. The scrolled wallpaper, floral carpeting, and heavy silk curtains well illustrated the rich palette and mixed patterns characteristic of antebellum taste."

It was listed on the National Register of Historic Places in 1982.

== History and description ==
The house sits on land that was purchased by James Bumgartner's grandfather, Christian, in either 1775 or 1784. Christian's son Jacob founded a distillery on the farm in 1820 that produced the popular "J. Bumgartner's Pure Old Rye Whiskey". James acquired the land, slaves and other property from his father by covenant in 1847, although the transfer was not documented in the tax records until 1855. James hired Jonathan Brown, a Richmond contractor and carpenter, to build a replacement for the previous dwelling in 1854. Completed three years later, the house... James' son J. Alexander inherited the property upon his father's death in 1890. Five years later the distillery went bankrupt and the farm had to be auctioned off to pay off debts. It was purchased by his sister Bettie and has remained in her family through 2007.

James decorated and furnished his house in the latest fashion and it serves as an important example of upper-middle-class taste of the mid-Victorian period. The majority of these pieces were purchased from Richmond-area merchants. Most of these survived due to a female family member's determination to keep the rooms as she remembered them from her childhood.

The house is a two-story, square, brick dwelling with a double-pile, central-passage plan, and a single-story, rear-service ell. It features a one-story Greek Ionic portico with fancy scrolled lattice, rear porches with Gothic railings, and bracketed cornices. Also on the property are an associated bank barn, granary, and shed.

== Bibliography ==
- Nutt, Joe (2007). Historic Houses of Augusta County, Virginia: Pen & Ink Drawings of Fifty-two Homes with Historical Narratives. The Humphries Press. ISBN 978-1-4243-3276-2.
