= Greenville, Virginia =

- CDP
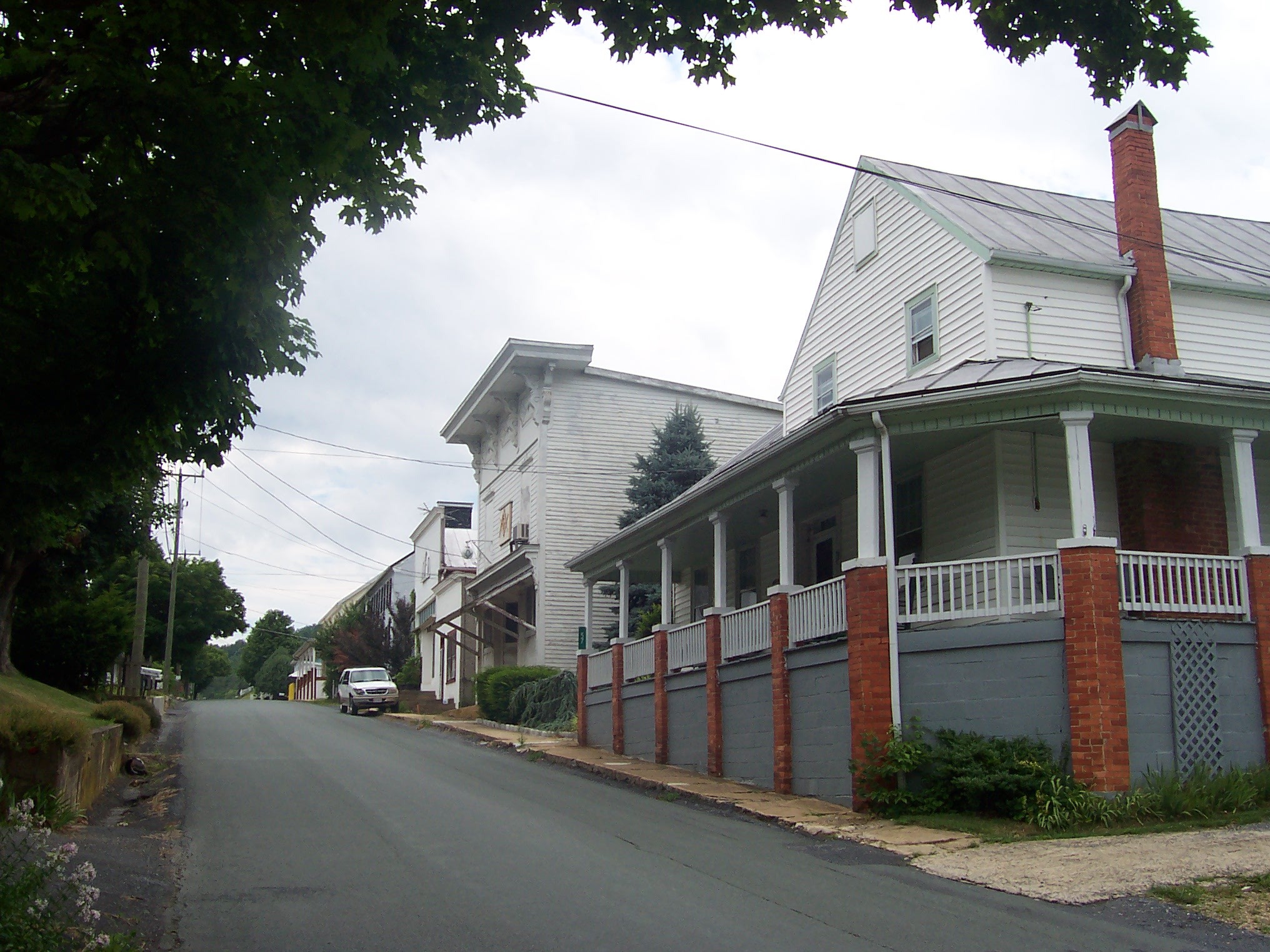
- Main Street, Greenville, showing the old Masonic building

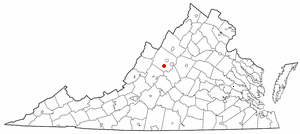
- Location of Greenville, Virginia
- Coordinates: 38°0′16″N 79°9′29″W
- Country: United States
- State: Virginia
- County: Augusta

Area
  - Total: 3.7 sq mi (9.5 km^{2})
  - Land: 3.7 sq mi (9.5 km^{2})
  - Water: 0 sq mi (0.0 km^{2})
- Elevation: 1,601 ft (488 m)

Population (2020)
  - Total: 887
  - Density: 240/sq mi (93/km^{2})
- Time zone: UTC−5 (Eastern (EST))
  - Summer (DST): UTC−4 (EDT)
- ZIP code: 24440
- Area code: 540
- FIPS code: 51-32944
- GNIS feature ID: 1495616

Greenville is a census-designated place (CDP) in Augusta County, Virginia, United States. The population was 887 at the 2020 census. It is part of the Staunton–Waynesboro Micropolitan Statistical Area.

== History ==
As early as 1794, Greenville was platted and divided into 14 lots of 1-acre (4,000 m^{2}) and sold by Thomas and Jane Steele. Greenville soon became a very busy stagecoach stop. This was because there were 3 major roads all intersecting at or near Greenville. One road connected Greenville with Staunton, another ran from Waynesboro to Middlebrook, and the south road led to Midway (now Steeles Tavern), Fairfield, and Lexington. The town slowly grew, and by 1810, the population had grown to 162, comparing to Staunton's 1225, and Waynesboro's 250. An 1835 account of Greenville said that it had an extensive manufacturing flour mill and a woolen manufactory, two physicians in the area, contained 50 dwelling houses, 3 general stores, 2 taverns, 1 academy, 2 tanyards, 2 saddlers, 2 tailors, 1 blacksmith shop, 1 cabinet maker, 1 wheelwright, 1 saddle tree maker, 3 house carpenters, 1 hatter, and 4 boot and shoe makers. The population was about 250 in 1928.

Bethel Green and Clover Mount are listed on the National Register of Historic Places.

The 2023 Virginia plane crash happened near here but across the border in Nelson County.

== Notable person ==
Kate Smith (1907-1986), a popular American radio singer of the Great Depression and World War II years, was born in Greenville. A statue of her stands outside the Wachovia Spectrum in Philadelphia because her rendition of "God Bless America" has long been considered a good luck charm for important games of the Philadelphia Flyers hockey team.

== Geography ==
Greenville is located at 38°0′16″N 79°9′29″W (38.004412, −79.157964).

According to the United States Census Bureau, the CDP has a total area of 3.7 square miles (9.5 km^{2}), all land.

== Demographics ==
Historical population
Census	Pop.	Note	%±
2000	886		—
2010	832		−6.1%
2020	887		6.6%
U.S. Decennial Census; 2000 2010 2020

Greenville was first listed as a census designated place in the 2000 U.S. census. As of the census of 2000, there were 886 people, 234 households, and 193 families residing in the CDP. The population density was 242.7 people per square mile (93.7/km^{2}). There were 251 housing units at an average density of 68.8/sq mi (26.6/km^{2}). The racial makeup of the CDP was 82.84% White, 16.70% African American, 0.34% Native American, and 0.11% from two or more races. Hispanic or Latino of any race were 0.45% of the population.

There were 234 households, out of which 33.3% had children under the age of 18 living with them, 69.7% were married couples living together, 8.5% had a female householder with no husband present, and 17.1% were non-families. 15.4% of all households were made up of individuals, and 6.0% had someone living alone who was 65 years of age or older. The average household size was 2.66 and the average family size was 2.95.

In the CDP, the population was spread out, with 16.3% under the age of 18, 7.8% from 18 to 24, 42.0% from 25 to 44, 22.5% from 45 to 64, and 11.5% who were 65 years of age or older. The median age was 37 years. For every 100 females there were 184.0 males. For every 100 females age 18 and over, there were 198.0 males.

The median income for a household in the CDP was $44,313, and the median income for a family was $48,571. Males had a median income of $38,750 versus $21,161 for females. The per capita income for the CDP was $14,598. About 2.6% of families and 2.4% of the population were below the poverty line, including none of those under age 18 and 4.0% of those age 65 or over.
