= Shenandoah Caverns =

Cave in Virginia, United States

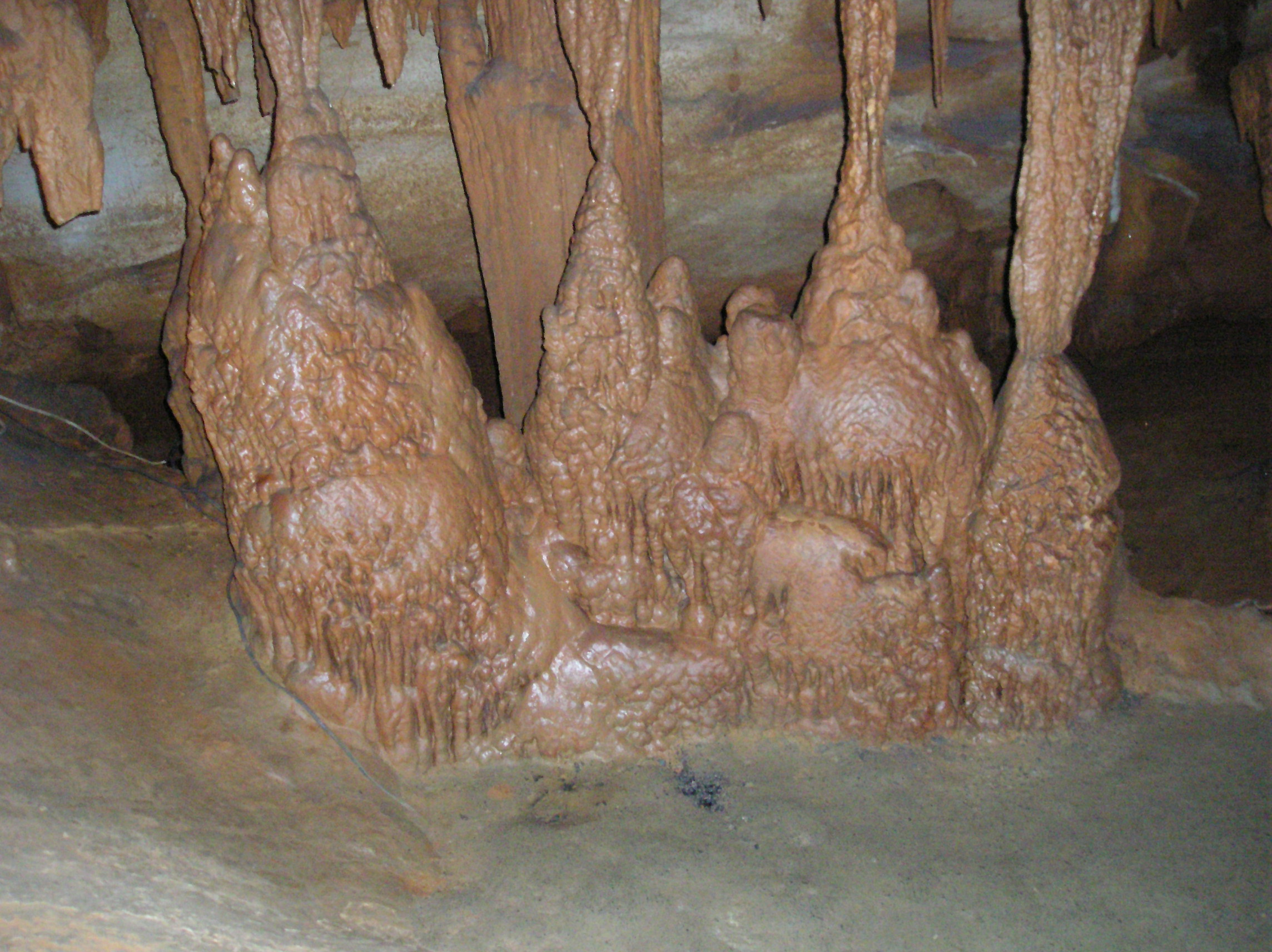

- Location within Shenandoah Valley Location within Virginia Location within the United States
- Location: near Mount Jackson, Virginia, U.S.
- Coordinates: 38°42′56″N 78°40′9.40″W
- Website: shenandoahcaverns.com

Shenandoah Caverns is a commercial show cave located near Mount Jackson, Virginia, in the Shenandoah Valley. It is the only cavern in Virginia that has elevator access.

The Shenandoah Caverns has a mile-long guided tour, and its temperature naturally remains at 54 degrees year-round. Seventeen "rooms" of connecting chambers are traveled through during this time. Geological formations have been named: the Diamond Cascade, the Grotto of the Gods, the Rainbow Lake, the Oriental Tea Garden, and the Capitol Dome, and these are lighted for display. The "bacon" formations were featured in a 1964 issue of National Geographic Magazine.

== History ==
Shenandoah Caverns was discovered in 1884 during the construction of the Southern Railway through the Shenandoah Valley. Many local farmers, including Abraham Neff, donated stone of their own property for the construction of the railway. The Neff family allowed the railroad to quarry rock on their property, near where the railroad was built. Neff's two sons were playing in quarry when they discovered cold air rising from a hole in the ground. Their curiosity was piqued, so the boys retrieved ropes and candles and scrambled down the 275-foot twisting and winding shaft to make their way into the caverns.

The railway was instrumental to the opening of Shenandoah Caverns. A local businessman in Woodstock, Hunter Chapman, was a stockholder in the B&O railroad. When he heard about the railroad going through, and the discovery of the caverns, he saw an opportunity to open an attraction on the railway. He approached Abraham Neff and asked him to sell his property, which he did so in 1922. Chapman opened Shenandoah Caverns, with a full-service hotel on the second and third floors. The passenger train ran until after WWII.

The caverns were sold to H. B. Long in 1954. In 1957, during a remodeling project, the caverns' lodge caught fire and destroyed the top two floors.

In 1966 Earl C. Hargrove, Jr., owner of Hargrove, Inc. in Lanham, Maryland, purchased Shenandoah Caverns. Mr. Hargrove's company was responsible for the creation of parade floats and props for every Inaugural since Truman's in 1949, as well as Miss America Pageants, Philadelphia Thanksgiving Day Parades, and many other national celebrations. To display retired parade floats, American Celebration on Parade was opened in 2000 on the Shenandoah Caverns property.

In the 1990s, the second floor of the caverns' lodge was renovated, and Main Street of Yesteryear opened in 1996.

In 2007, Hargrove opened the Yellow Barn to showcase his antique carriages and farm equipment, as well as to be a wedding and special events venue.

== Caverns formation ==
The Shenandoah Valley is underlying with limestone and also has karst topography, forming caves throughout the region. Rainwater becomes slightly acidic as it seeps through the soil. The acid slowly erodes the calcium carbonate, the main component of limestone, creating caves, sinkholes and springs throughout the landscape. There are many caves and caverns throughout the surrounding area.
