= Mint Spring, Virginia =

Unincorporated community in Virginia, United States

- Unincorporated community
- Location within Virginia Location within the United States
- Coordinates: 38°04′28″N 79°06′03″W
- Country: United States
- State: Virginia
- County: Augusta
- Elevation: 1,627 ft (496 m)
- Time zone: UTC-5 (Eastern (EST))
  - Summer (DST): UTC-4 (EDT)
- ZIP code: 24463
- Area code: 540
- GNIS feature ID: 1499751

Mint Spring is an unincorporated community in Augusta County, Virginia, United States. Mint Spring is located 6.1 miles (9.8 km) south-southwest of Staunton on U.S. Route 11 and has a post office with ZIP code 24463.

Chapel Hill was listed on the National Register of Historic Places in 1978.

A church, Mint Spring United Methodist is also located in the area.
