= Bowmans Crossing, Virginia =

- CDP
- Interactive map of Bowmans Crossing, Virginia
- Coordinates: 38°48′29″N 78°35′31″W
- Country: United States
- State: Virginia
- County: Shenandoah
- Time zone: UTC−5 (Eastern (EST))
  - Summer (DST): UTC−4 (EDT)
- FIPS code: 51-04928

Bowmans Crossing is a CDP in Shenandoah County, Virginia, United States.

== Demographics ==
Historical population
Census	Pop.	Note	%±

The United States Census Bureau defined Bowmans Crossing as a census designated place (CDP) in 2023.
