= Salem Fair =

Agricultural fair

Coordinates: 37.285524°N 80.039329°W

- Genre: Fair
- Location: Salem, Virginia
- Years active: 1988–2019, 2021–
- Website: http://www.salemfair.com

The Salem Fair is an agricultural fair in Salem, Virginia, in the United States. It is the largest free fair in the state of Virginia. The fair takes place annually from late June through early July. Attractions include live music and various performances, Fourth of July fireworks, commercial exhibits, and a petting zoo.

The COVID-19 pandemic caused officials to scrap 2020's fair.
