= Fairfield, Rockbridge County, Virginia =

Fairfield, Virginia
- Census-designated place
- Location within Virginia Location within the United States
- Coordinates: 37°52′58″N 79°16′58″W
- Country: United States
- State: Virginia
- County: Rockbridge

Area
  - Total: 0.68 sq mi (1.76 km^{2})
  - Land: 0.68 sq mi (1.75 km^{2})
  - Water: 0 sq mi (0.0 km^{2})
- Elevation: 1,588 ft (484 m)

Population (2020)
  - Total: 337
- Time zone: UTC-5 (Eastern (EST))
  - Summer (DST): UTC-4 (EDT)
- ZIP Code: 24435
- Area code: 540
- FIPS code: 51-26656
- GNIS feature ID: 2807437

Fairfield is an unincorporated community and census-designated place (CDP) in Rockbridge County, Virginia, United States. As of the 2020 census, it had a population of 257.

The CDP is in the northeastern part of the county, along U.S. Route 11 (North Lee Highway), which leads northeast 12 miles (19 km) to Greenville and southwest 11 miles (18 km) to Lexington. Interstate 81/64 forms the northwestern edge of the community, with access from Exit 200 (Sterrett Road). The Interstate highway runs parallel to US 11 and leads northeast 23 miles (37 km) to Staunton and southwest 8 miles (13 km) to where the highways split near Lexington.

== Geography ==
Fairfield is drained by Marlbrook Creek, which flows southeast to the South River, a southwestward-flowing tributary of the Maury River and part of the James River watershed.

It lies at an elevation of 1,588 feet.

== Demographics ==
Fairfield first appeared as a census designated place in the 2020 U.S. census.
