= Virginia State Route 185 =

State highway in Shenandoah County, Virginia, US

State Route 185
- Stoney Creek Boulevard

Route information
- Maintained by VDOT
- Length: 1.00 mi (1.61 km)
- Existed: 1964–present

Major junctions
- West end: SR 675 / SR 686 near Edinburg
- I-81 near Edinburg
- East end: US 11 in Edinburg

Location
- Country: United States
- State: Virginia
- Counties: Shenandoah

Highway system
- Virginia Routes; Interstate; US; Primary; Secondary; Byways; History; HOT lanes
← SR 184	→ SR 186

State Route 185 (SR 185) is a primary state highway in the U.S. state of Virginia. Known as Stoney Creek Boulevard, the state highway runs 1.00 mile (1.61 km) from SR 675 and SR 686 near Edinburg east to U.S. Route 11 (US 11) in Edinburg. SR 185 serves as a connector between Edinburg and Interstate 81 (I-81) in central Shenandoah County.

== Route description ==
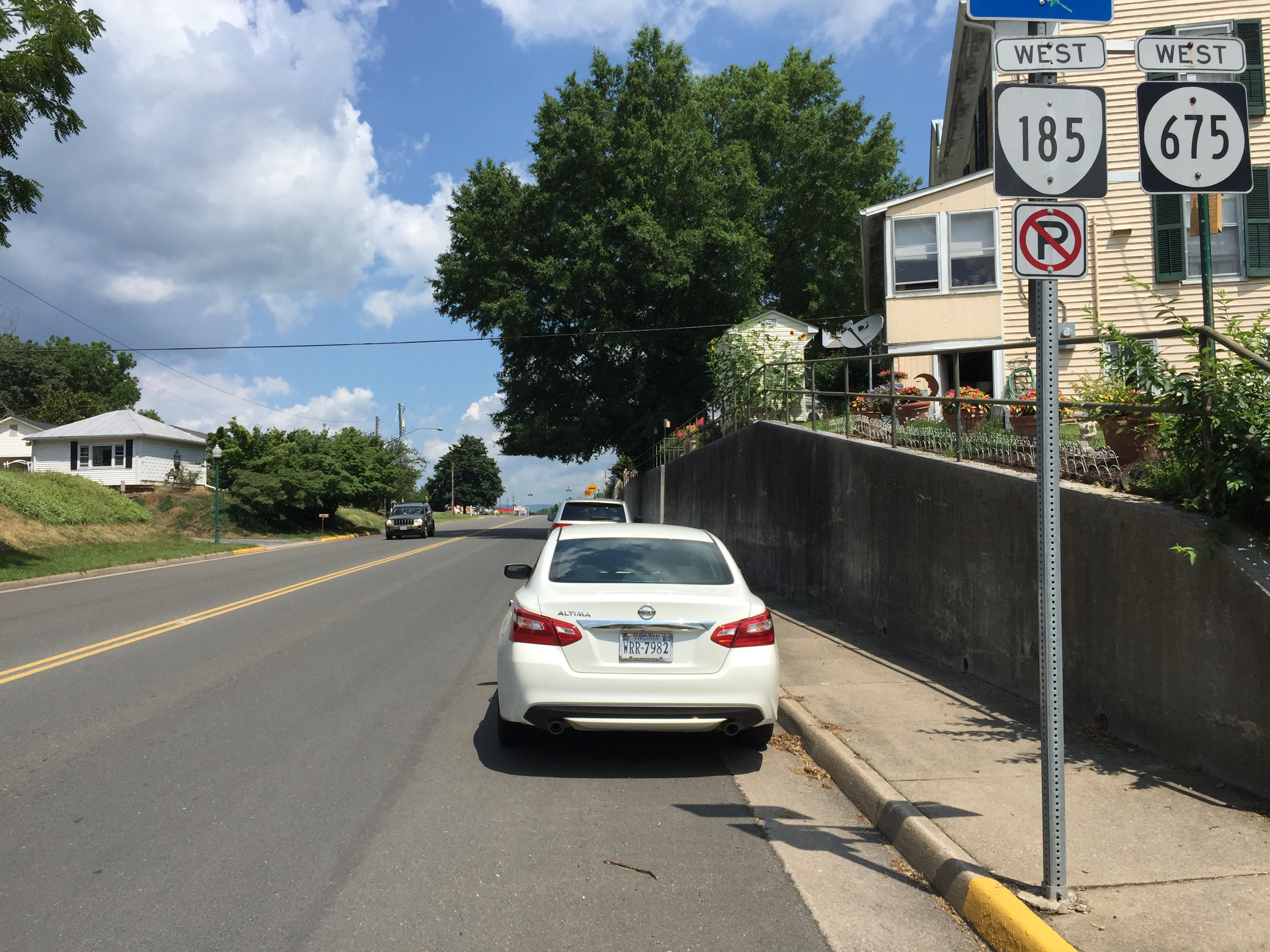
View west along SR 185 at Picadilly Street in Edinburg

SR 185 begins at a three-way intersection at the southern end of SR 686 (South Ox Road) just west of Edinburg. The road continues west as SR 675 (Stoney Creek Road); that secondary highway has a signed concurrency with SR 185, although the secondary highway is not officially part of the primary highway. SR 185 heads southeast through a diamond interchange with I-81 and enters the town of Edinburg running parallel to Stony Creek to the south. The state highway has a grade crossing of Norfolk Southern Railway's B-Line before reaching its eastern terminus at US 11 (Main Street) at the west end of downtown Edinburg.

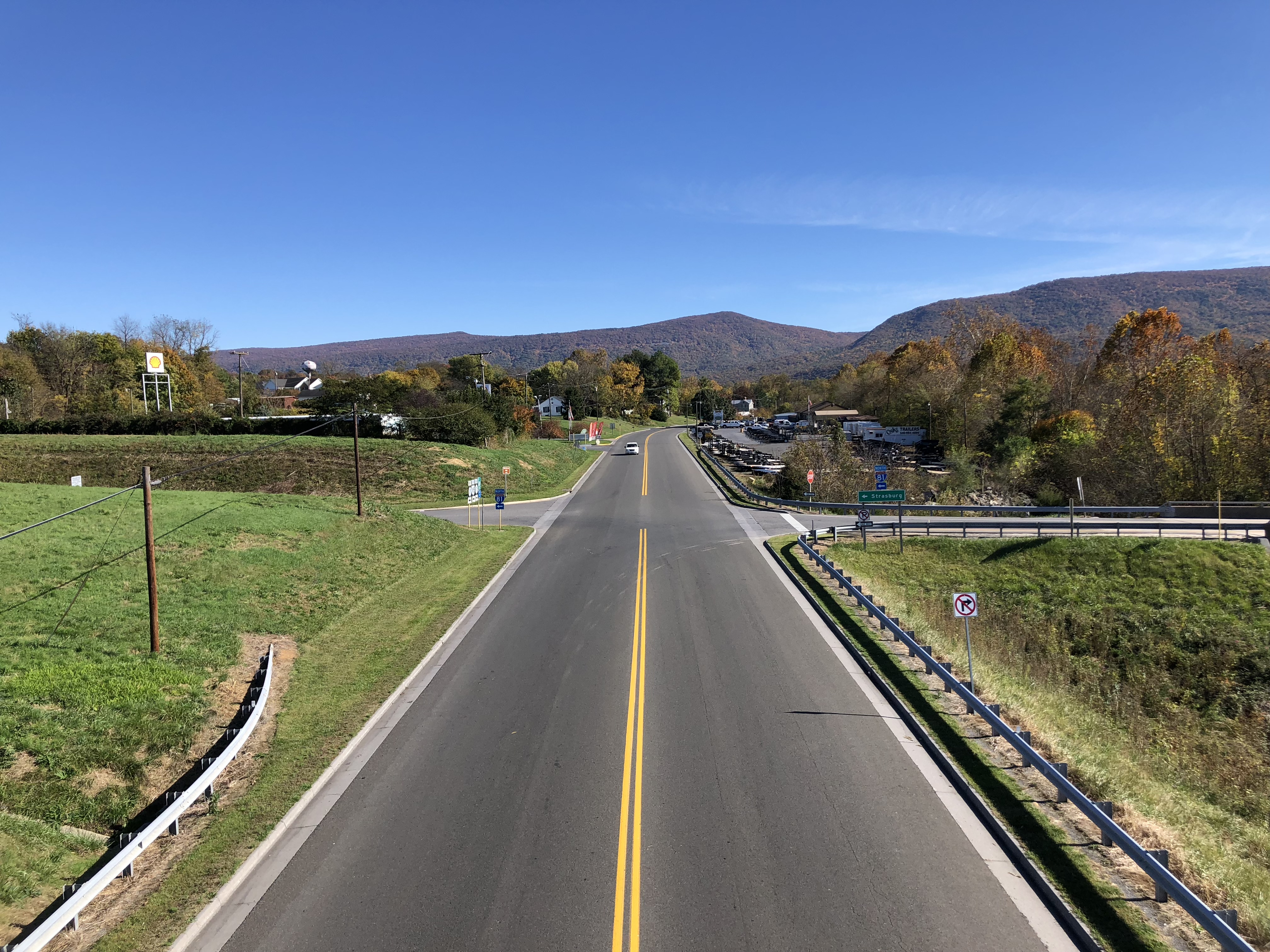
SR 185 eastbound viewed from I-81

== Major intersections ==
The entire route is in Shenandoah County.

Location	mi	km	Destinations	Notes
	0.00	0.00	SR 675 west / SR 686 (Stoney Creek Road / South Ox Road)	Western terminus
	0.08	0.13	I-81 – Strasburg, New Market	Exit 279 (I-81)
Edinburg	1.00	1.61	US 11 (South Main Street)	Eastern terminus
1.000 mi = 1.609 km; 1.000 km = 0.621 mi
