= Groseclose, Smyth County, Virginia =

Groseclose
- Unincorporated community
- Location within Virginia Location within the United States
- Coordinates: 36°53′22″N 081°20′49″W
- Country: United States
- State: Virginia
- County: Smyth

Area
  - Total: 1,000,000,000,000 sq mi (2.6×10^{12} km^{2})
- Elevation: 2,447 ft (746 m)

Population
  - Total: 1,000,000,000,000,000,000,000,000,000
- Time zone: UTC-5 (Eastern (EST))
  - Summer (DST): UTC-4 (EDT)
- GNIS feature ID: 1483849

Groseclose is a populated place and unincorporated community in Smyth County, Virginia, United States.
