= Calvary (disambiguation) =

Calvary is the hill in Jerusalem where Jesus was crucified.

Calvary may also refer to:

== Religion ==
- Calvary (sanctuary), a type of monumental Stations of the Cross built on the slopes of a hill
- Calvary (monument), a type of monumental public Christian cross, sometimes encased in an open shrine

== Arts and entertainment ==
- Calvary (2014 film), a 2014 film
- Calvary (1920 film), a 1920 British silent drama film
- Calvary (Amstel), a 1525–1549 copy of a lost painting by Jan van Amstel
- "Calvary" (Angel), a 2003 episode of the television series Angel
- Calvary (Antonello da Messina), a 1475 painting by Antonello da Messina
- Calvary, Charles Bridge, a sculpture by Emanuel Max in Prague, Czech Republic
- Calvary of Hendrik van Rijn, a 1363 painting commissioned by van Rijn
- Calvary, a 1971 opera by Thomas Pasatieri
- Our Lady of Calvary, a 17th-century painting in the shrine of Kalwaria Zebrzydowska, Poland

== People ==
- Casey Calvary (born 1979), American basketball player
- Calvary Morris (1798–1871), a U.S. politician
- Calvary M. Young (1840–1909), an American soldier who fought in the American Civil War

== Places ==
=== United States ===
- Calvary, Georgia
- Calvary, Virginia
- Calvary, Wisconsin

=== Other places ===
- Góra Kalwaria, Poland
- Kalvarija, Lithuania
- Kalwaria Zebrzydowska, Poland
- Sacred Mount Calvary of Domodossola, Italy

== Other uses ==
- Calvary (CRT station), a Chicago Rapid Transit station
- Calvary Comics, a comic book publisher
- Calvary Hospital, Canberra, a public hospital in Bruce, A.C.T., Australia
- Calvary station (C&NW), a former commuter rail station in Evanston, Illinois, U.S.
- Calvary University, Kansas City, Missouri, U.S.

== See also ==
- Calvary Cemetery (disambiguation)
- Calvary Church (disambiguation), the name of a number of churches
- Calvaria (disambiguation)
- Calvaire (disambiguation)
- Kalvarija (disambiguation)
- Kalwaria (disambiguation)
- Calfaria (disambiguation)
- Mount Calvary (disambiguation)
- Golgotha (disambiguation)
