= Calvary Church =

Calvary Church may refer to:

- Calvary Church of Santa Ana, California
- Calvary Church, Hillcrest, Delaware
- Calvary Church (Grand Rapids), Michigan
- Calvary Church (Manhattan), New York
- Calvary Church (Charlotte), North Carolina
- Calvary Church (Santo Stefano di Camastra), Sicily

== See also ==
- Calvary (disambiguation)
- Calvary Chapel, a Christian denomination
- Calvary Methodist Church, Boston, Massachusetts
- Calvary United Methodist Church, Philadelphia, Pennsylvania
- Calvary Holiness Church (disambiguation)
- Calvary Baptist Church (disambiguation)
- Calvary Episcopal Church (disambiguation)
- Calvary Lutheran Church and Parsonage (Silverton, Oregon)
- Calvary Presbyterian Church (disambiguation)
- Calvary Memorial Church, Oak Park, Illinois
- Calvary Reformed Church, Kampala, Uganda
- Calvary Christian Church, a multi campus Pentecostal church based in Australia
