= Calfaria =

Calfaria (the Welsh name for Calvary) may refer to:

- Calfaria Baptist Chapel, Llanelli
- Calfaria Chapel, Abercynon
- Calfaria Chapel, Aberdare
- Calfaria Chapel, Penygroes

== See also ==
- Bryn Calfaria, a hymn tune
- Calvaria (disambiguation)
- Calvary Church (disambiguation)
