= Calvary Episcopal Church =

Calvary Episcopal Church may refer to:

In the United States

- Calvary Episcopal Church (Golden, Colorado), listed on the U.S. National Register of Historic Places (NRHP) in Colorado
- Calvary Episcopal Church (Americus, Georgia), on watchlist of the Georgia Trust for Historic Preservation
- Calvary Episcopal Church (Batavia, Illinois)
- Calvary Episcopal Church (Louisville, Kentucky), listed on the NRHP in Kentucky
- Calvary Episcopal Church (Rochester, Minnesota)
- Calvary Episcopal Church (Red Lodge, Montana), listed on the NRHP in Montana
- Calvary Episcopal Church (Summit, New Jersey)
- Calvary Episcopal Church (Burnt Hills, New York), listed on the NRHP in Saratoga County
- Calvary Episcopal Church (Manhattan), New York City, New York
- Calvary Episcopal Church (McDonough, New York), listed on the NRHP in Chenango County, New York
- Calvary Episcopal Church (Utica, New York), listed on the NRHP in Utica, New York
- Calvary Episcopal Church and Churchyard (Tarboro, North Carolina), listed on the NRHP in North Carolina
- Calvary Episcopal Church (Cincinnati), Ohio; and Sunday School Building
- Calvary Cathedral (Sioux Falls, South Dakota)
- Calvary Episcopal Church (Pittsburgh), Pennsylvania
- Calvary Episcopal Church (Memphis, Tennessee), listed on the NRHP in Tennessee

== See also ==
- Calvary Church (disambiguation)
