= Kalvaria =

Kalvaria may refer to:

- Góra Kalwaria, Poland
- Kalwaria Pacławska, Poland
- Kalwaria Zebrzydowska, Poland

== See also ==
- Kalvarija (disambiguation), the name of two locations in Lithuania and one in Serbia
- Calvary, the site of Jesus's crucifixion after which all of the above are named
- Calvaria (disambiguation), multiple meanings
