= Samuel Jemigbon =

Nigerian Christian clergyman

- Born: Sadiq Jemigbon; March 4, 1934; Ayeh-Gbede, Kogi State, Nigeria
- Died: June 17, 2009 (aged 75); Lagos State, Nigeria
- Other names: Samuel Sunday Jemigbon
- Occupation: clergyman
- Years active: 1948–2009
- Spouse: Mary Olanrewaju

Samuel Sunday Jemigbon (March 4, 1934–June 17, 2009) was a Nigerian Christian clergyman who doubled as the Chairman of the Lagos, Western/Northern Area (LAWNA) Territory and Vice-President of The Apostolic Church Nigeria.

== Life ==
Born Sadiq Jemigbon to a Muslim father and a Christian mother in Ayeh-Gbede, Kogi State, Nigeria, he had his early education through the attendance of Islamic schools after he chose to practice his father's religion. In 1948, he converted to the Christian faith and adopted the name Samuel before he went on to acquire western education in 1950 at the age of sixteen.

Upon completing his education at the Metropolitan College, Lagos, Jemigbon was a class teacher in a local school in his community before he left to become full member of The Apostolic Church in 1969 where he rose through the ranks of district pastor and LAWNA Territorial administrative secretary to become the third LAWNA Territorial Chairman upon his installment on 31 July 1994 following the death of Isaiah Sakpo. He was later appointed Vice-President of The Apostolic Church Nigeria that same year. His many contributions to the church included the rapid construction of the National Temple during his tenure.

== Death ==
He died in his sleep on 17 June 2009 at his residence in Lagos.
