= Eyo Edet Okon =

1st President of The Apostolic Church Nigeria
- Preceded by: Pastor Idris Vaughn
- Succeeded by: Gabriel Olutola

Personal details
- Born: Eyo Edet Okon; June 10, 1914 Odukpani, Cross River State
- Died: September 28, 2010 (aged 96) Calabar, Cross River State
- Spouse: Late Nyong Okpo Mfon
- Education: The Apostolic Church Bible College, Pen-y-groes; The Apostolic Bible College, Obot Idim, Uyo
- Occupation: Pastor; minister

Eyo Edet Okon (10 June 1914 – 28 September 2010) colloquially called Akamba Ete (Great Papa) was a Nigerian Christian clergyman and minister. He was the first indigenous President and third overall National president of The Apostolic Church Nigeria, a position he held until his death in 2010.

favourite songs are -

1) Ata Ata Ubong eyene Abasi'o, Ubong isong emi mmowo ke'yanga ekpanga.

2) Hallelujah Hallelujah Hallelujah Ubong eyene Jehovah.

== Early life and education ==
Eyo was born on 10 June 1914 to Chief Edet Okon Itam and Madam Aya Uda Okon Itam in Creek Town, Odukpani Local Government Area of Cross River State. He was the fifth male and ninth child of his father's fourteen children.

In 1929, Eyo obtained his Standard Six Certificate at The Church of Scotland Mission School, Creek Town. He followed in the footsteps of Essien Edet Okon, the renowned Hope Waddell Mathematics teacher (his elder brother), popularly called Okon Geometery. He began training for the teaching profession and in 1930 he obtained the basic qualification for enrolment in the teaching profession.

He went on to study Theology at The Apostolic Church Bible College, Pen-y-groes, Great Britain in the 1950s which was followed by a Diploma in Theology from The Apostolic Bible College, Obot Idim, Uyo, Akwa Ibom State in 1962.

== Ministerial work and service ==
Honours:

- State honour and award as a distinguished pastor, counselor, teacher, philanthropist and influential spiritual leader for Cross River State and Akwa ibom states, October 2000 by his excellency Dr Donald Duke, then the governor of Cross River State.

-Honoured by the Apostolic Church Cameroon as the pioneer Evangelist and father of the church in the Republic of Cameroon

-Honored by the Apostolic Church International council Bradford, Britain (1981)

-Honoured by The Apostolic Church maritime field as a field pioneer indigenous minister -Honoured by Cross River State Students in the United States of America

- Honoured by the Apostolic Church United States of America (TACUSA) June 30, 2002 -Global prayer Force "Hero of faith " November 2008

-international chaplains corps (intercorps) 2009

== Death ==
Eyo was reported to have told his immediate family members that there were five significant meetings he would conduct, insisting that he should be prepared for those meetings, this was followed by him refusing to attend to visitors so that nothing would distract him from the meetings. On 24 September 2010, he showed signs of weakness and died on 28 September 2010 in his residence in Calabar.

Tributes came from government functionaries, traditional rulers and individuals for his enormous impact in the revolutionizing of Christianity in Nigeria. The government of Cross River State described him as “a pastoral icon who gave his all in the propagation and evangelization of the gospel of Christ”. Former Governor of Akwa Ibom State Godswill Akpabio pointed out that “his deep spiritual insight and dedication to what God says, marked him out as one of the pillars of Christian faith.”

== Family life ==
In 1937, Eyo Okon married the late Deaconess Nyong Okpo Mfon who died on 7 March 1985. He remained a widower until his death.
