= Sampson Igwe =

Nigerian Christian Clergyman

3rd President of The Apostolic Church Nigeria
- Incumbent
- Assumed office April 29, 2017
- Preceded by: Gabriel Olutola

Personal details
- Born: Sampson Ekwutosilam Igwe Umugolo Umunakanu, Ehime Mbano LGA of Imo State
- Education: The Apostolic Church Primary School Amumara Mbaise, Imo State; Comprehensive Secondary School Awomama, Imo State; United Missionary Theological College (UMTC) Ilorin, Asbury Theological Seminary, Kentucky, USA
- Occupation: Pastor; minister
- Profession: Teacher; author

Sampson Igwe is a Nigerian Christian clergyman and the president of the Apostolic Church Nigeria. He was inducted as the national president of the Apostolic Church Nigeria at an induction ceremony on 30 July 2017 at The Apostolic Church Nigeria, National Temple, Ororunda, Ketu, Lagos.
