= Calvary Presbyterian Church =

Calvary Presbyterian Church may refer to:

in the United States

- Calvary Presbyterian Church (San Francisco), California
- Calvary Presbyterian Church (Staten Island, New York)
- Calvary Presbyterian Church (Cleveland), Ohio
- Calvary Presbyterian Church (Portland, Oregon)
- Calvary Presbyterian Church (Milwaukee), Wisconsin

== See also ==
- Calvary Church (disambiguation)
