= Mount Calvary (disambiguation) =

Mount Calvary is the place where Jesus was crucified.

Mount Calvary may also refer to:

- Mount Calvary, Wisconsin
- A Cornish language text "Passyon agan Arluth", edited for publication by Davies Gilbert as Mount Calvary

== Churches ==
- Sacred Mount Calvary of Domodossola, a sanctuary in Italy
- Mount Calvary Church, in Baltimore, Maryland
- Mount Calvary Baptist Church, in Orange, Virginia
- Mount Calvary Lutheran Church, in Luray, Virginia
- Mount Calvary United Methodist Church, in New York City

== See also ==
- Mount Calvary Cemetery (disambiguation)
