= Golgotha (disambiguation) =

Golgotha /ˈɡɒlɡəθə/ (also known as Calvary) was the hill on which Jesus was crucified.

Golgotha or Golgota may also refer to:

- In the Eastern Orthodox Church, a Golgotha is a representation of the crucified Jesus; see Crucifixion in the arts (Eastern church)

== Literature ==
- Golgotha, a 1980 thriller novel by John Gardner
- Golgotha, an early 1900s work by Czech poet Josef Svatopluk Machar
- Golgotha (The last days of Christ), a 1937 work by Kannada poet M. Govinda Pai
- Golgotha, part six of the limited series Herogasm as part of The Boys comic book franchise

== Music ==
- Golgotha (oratorio), 1942 oratorio by Franck Martin
- Golgotha (W.A.S.P. album), 2015
- Golgotha (With Blood Comes Cleansing album), 2006
- Golgotha (band), a previous incarnation of the band Acid Bath

== Film ==
- Golgotha (film), a 1935 French film about the death of Jesus Christ
- Golgota, 1966 film directed by Mircea Drăgan

== Other uses ==
- Golgotha (video game), an unreleased computer game
- Golgotha of the Beskids, a Way of the Cross on Matyska hill, Radziechowy village, Silesian Voivodeship, Poland
- Golgotha, Consumatum Est, another name for the 1867 painting Jerusalem by Jean-Léon Gérôme
- Lord Golgotha, a fictional character in the 2016–2017 Millarworld comic book series Reborn

== See also ==
- Albania's Golgotha: Indictment of the Exterminators of the Albanian People, a German published document of 1913 written by Austrian publicist and politician Leo Freundlich
- Albanian Golgotha, or Serbian Golgotha, the Royal Serbian Army's retreat through Albania in 1915
- Armenian Golgotha, a 1922 memoir written by Grigoris Balakian
- Calvary (disambiguation)
- Canada's Golgotha, a 1918 bronze sculpture by British sculptor Francis Derwent Wood
- Russian Golgotha, an epithet applied to the Butovo firing range
