= Eugene Nida =

American linguist (1914–2011)

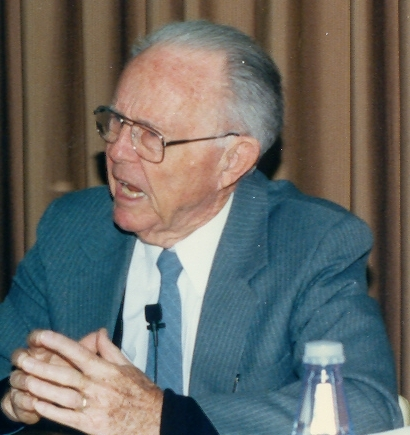
- Born: Eugene Albert Nida; November 11, 1914; Oklahoma City, Oklahoma, U.S.
- Died: August 25, 2011 (aged 96); Madrid, Spain
- Spouses: Althea Lucille Sprague (m. 1943; died 1993); María Elena Fernandez-Miranda (m. 1997)

Academic background
- Education: University of California, Los Angeles (BA); University of Southern California (MA); University of Michigan (PhD)
- Thesis: A Synopsis of English Syntax (1943)

Academic work
- Discipline: Linguist
- Institutions: American Bible Society

Eugene Albert Nida (November 11, 1914 – August 25, 2011) was an American linguist who developed the dynamic equivalence theory of Bible translation and is considered one of the founders of modern translation studies.

== Life ==
Nida was born in Oklahoma City, Oklahoma, on November 11, 1914. He became a Christian at a young age, when he responded to the altar call at his church "to accept Christ as my Saviour."

He graduated summa cum laude from the University of California, Los Angeles in 1936. After graduating he attended Camp Wycliffe, where Bible translation theory was taught. He ministered for a short time among the Tarahumara Indians in Chihuahua, Mexico, until health problems due to an inadequate diet and the high altitude forced him to leave. Sometime in this period, Nida became a founding charter member of Wycliffe Bible Translators, a related organization to the Summer Institute of Linguistics.

In 1937, Nida undertook studies at the University of Southern California, where he obtained a master's degree in New Testament Greek in 1939. In that same year he became interim pastor of Calvary Church of Santa Ana, California following the resignation of its founding pastor. Despite his conservative background, in later years Nida became increasingly ecumenical and New Evangelical in his approach.

In 1943, Nida received his doctorate in linguistics from the University of Michigan. He was ordained as a Baptist minister. He married Althea Lucille Sprague in 1943 and settled in Greenwich, Connecticut. Althea Sprague died in 1993. In 1997, he married María Elena Fernandez-Miranda, a lawyer and diplomatic attache.

Nida retired in the early 1980s, although he continued to give lectures at universities all around the world, and lived in Alpine, Arizona, USA; Madrid, Spain and Brussels, Belgium. He died in Madrid on August 25, 2011, aged 96.

== Career ==
In 1943, Nida began his career as a linguist with the American Bible Society (ABS). He was quickly promoted to Associate Secretary for Versions, then worked as Executive Secretary for Translations until his retirement.

Nida was instrumental in engineering the joint effort between the Vatican and the United Bible Societies (UBS) to produce cross-denominational Bibles in translations across the globe. This work began in 1968 and was carried on in accordance with Nida's translation principle of Functional Equivalence.

Nida received an Honorary Doctorate from Heriot-Watt University in 1974.

== Theories ==
Nida has been a pioneer in the fields of translation theory and linguistics.

His doctoral dissertation, A Synopsis of English Syntax, was the first full-scale analysis of a major language according to the "immediate-constituent" theory. His textbook Morphology: The Descriptive Analysis of Words was one of the major works of American Structuralism. It remained the only thorough introduction to the field for decades and is still valuable for its many examples and exercises.

His most notable contribution to translation theory is Dynamic Equivalence, also known as Functional Equivalence. For more information, see "Dynamic and formal equivalence." Nida also developed the componential analysis technique, which split words into their components to help determine equivalence in translation (e.g. "bachelor" = male + unmarried). This is, perhaps, not the best example of the technique, though it is the most well-known.

Nida's dynamic-equivalence theory is often held in opposition to the views of philologists who maintain that an understanding of the source text (ST) can be achieved by assessing the inter-animation of words on the page, and that meaning is self-contained within the text (i.e. much more focused on achieving semantic equivalence).

This theory, along with other theories of correspondence in translating, are elaborated in his essay Principles of Correspondence, where Nida begins by asserting that given that "no two languages are identical, either in the meanings given to corresponding symbols or in the ways in which symbols are arranged in phrases and sentences, it stands to reason that there can be no absolute correspondence between languages. Hence, there can be no fully exact translations." While the impact of a translation may be close to the original, there can be no identity in detail.

Nida then sets forth three factors that must be taken into account in translating:

1. The nature of the message: in some messages the content is of primary consideration, and in others the form must be given a higher priority.
2. The purpose of the author and of the translator: to give information on both form and content; to aim at full intelligibility of the reader so he/she may understand the full implications of the message; for imperative purposes that aim at not just understanding the translation but also at ensuring no misunderstanding of the translation.
3. The type of audience: prospective audiences differ both in decoding ability and in potential interest.

While reminding that while there are no such things as "identical equivalents" in translating, Nida asserts that a translator must find the "closest natural equivalent." Here he distinguishes between two approaches to the translation task and types of translation: Formal Equivalence (F-E) and Dynamic Equivalence (D-E).

F-E focuses attention on the message itself, in both form and content. Such translations then would be concerned with such correspondences as poetry to poetry, sentence to sentence, and concept to concept. Such a formal orientation that typifies this type of structural equivalence is called a "gloss translation" in which the translator aims at reproducing as literally and meaningfully as possible the form and content of the original.

The principles governing an F-E translation would then be: reproduction of grammatical units; consistency in word usage; and meanings in terms of the source context.

D-E on the other hand aims at complete "naturalness" of expression. A D-E translation is directed primarily towards equivalence of response rather than equivalence of form. The relationship between the target language receptor and message should be substantially the same as that which existed between the original (source language) receptors and the message.

The principles governing a D-E translation then would be: conformance of a translation to the receptor language and culture as a whole; and the translation must be in accordance with the context of the message which involves the stylistic selection and arrangement of message constituents.

Nida and Lawrence Venuti have proven that translation studies is a much more complex discipline than may first appear, with the translator having to look beyond the text itself to deconstruct on an intra-textual level and decode on a referential level—assessing culture-specific items, idiom and figurative language to achieve an understanding of the source text and embark upon creating a translation which not only transfers what words mean in a given context, but also recreates the impact of the original text within the limits of the translator's own language system (linked to this topic: George Steiner, the Hermeneutic Motion, pragmatics, field, tenor, mode and the locutionary, illocutionary and perlocutionary). For example, a statement that Jesus "met" someone must be carefully translated into a language which distinguishes between "met for the first time", "met habitually" and "encounter."

== Works ==
Published works include the following:

- Linguistic Interludes – (Glendale, CA: Summer Institute of Linguistics, 1944 (Revised 1947))
- The Bible Translator – (Journal founded and edited by Dr. Nida (retired), 1949- )
- Morphology: The Descriptive Analysis of Words – (Univ. of Michigan Press, 2nd ed. 1949)
- Message and Mission – (Harper, 1960)
- Customs, Culture and Christianity – (Tyndale Press, 1963)
- Toward a Science of Translating – (Brill, 1964)
- Religion Across Cultures – (Harper, 1968)
- The Theory and Practice of Translation – (Brill, 1969, with C.R. Taber)
- A Componential Analysis of Meaning – (De Gruyter; Approaches to Semiotics col. 57)
- Understanding Latin Americans: With Special Reference to Religious Values and Movements – (William Carey Library, 1974)
- Language Structure and Translation: Essays – (Stanford University Press, 1975)
- From One Language to Another – (Nelson, 1986, with Jan de Waard)
- The Greek-English Lexicon of the New Testament Based on Semantic Domains – (UBS, 1988, with Johannes P. Louw)
- Contexts in Translating – (John Benjamins Publishing Company, Amsterdam, 2002)
- Fascinated by Languages – (John Benjamins Publishing Company, Amsterdam, 2003)

== See also ==
- Translation
- Hebrew Old Testament Text Project
