= Our Saviour's Atonement Lutheran Church =

Church in Manhattan, New York

Coordinates: 40°51′9.48″N 73°55′49.87″W

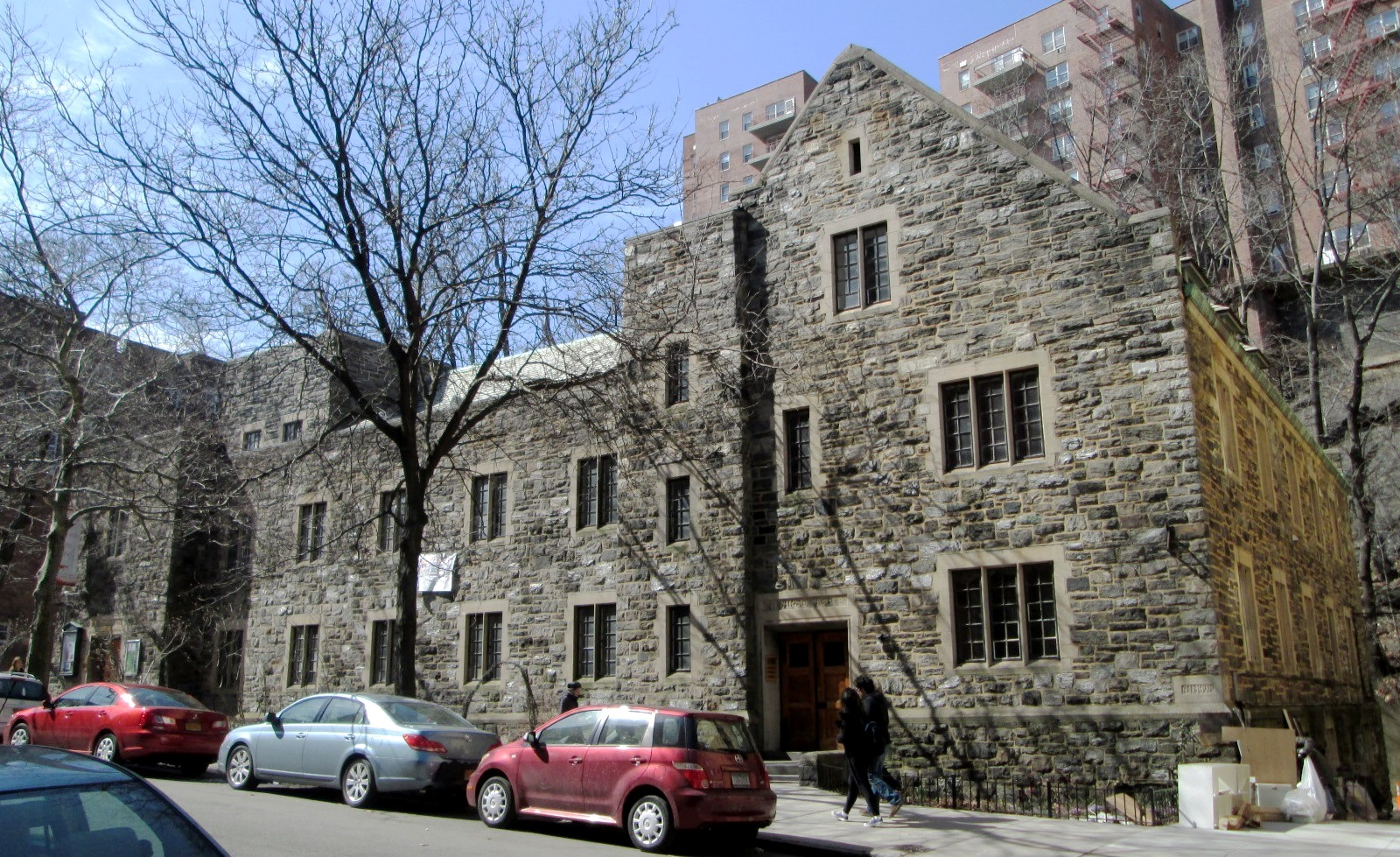
- (2013)
- Interactive map of the Our Saviour's Atonement Lutheran Church area

General information
- Location: Manhattan, New York City
- Construction started: 1897, 1898, 1925, 1928
- Completed: 1897, 1898, 1926, 1928
- Cost: $30,000 (1925), $175,000 (1928)

Design and construction
- Architects: Stoyan N. Karastoyanoff of 220 Audubon Avenue (1925); Mayers, Murray & Phillip of 2 West 47th Street (1928)

Our Saviour's Atonement Lutheran Church is a Lutheran church in Washington Heights, Manhattan, New York City at 578-580 West 187th Street. The original building was constructed from 1925 to 1926 at a cost of $30,000 to designs by architect Stoyan N. Karastoyanoff of 220 Audubon Avenue. It was demolished. Before the church was completed the original Lutheran Church of Our Saviour merged with The Evangelical Lutheran Church of the Atonement to become Our Saviour's Atonement Lutheran Church. The pastor at the time of construction was the Rev. Arthur E. Deitz.

Both merged congregations had been founded as mission churches of St. John's Evangelical Lutheran Church. The former Atonement Lutheran's church (established in 1896) at 116 Edgecombe Avenue (built 1897 and now owned by Mount Calvary United Methodist Church. Our Saviour's Church (established 1898), was first located at 525 West 179th Street before moving to 580 West 187th Street as the merged congregation. The congregation moved into their parish house after the Great Depression and the church is now the home of Holy Cross Armenian Apostolic Church.

The merged congregation continued to acquire property in Washington Heights speculating on the area's development with the extension of the New York City Subway's IRT Broadway–Seventh Avenue Line (1 train) and IND Eighth Avenue Line (A train). A hospital was planned but not begun. A parish house was started and completed in 1928 at a cost of $175,000 to designs by Mayers, Murray & Phillip of 2 West 47th Street. After the Stock Market Crash of 1929, plans for a new Gothic Revival church, designed by Mayers, Murray & Phillip, were scuttled. The congregation moved into the parish house, which was renamed the Cornerstone Center, "providing space for a video studio, dance and performance space, a kindergarten, a church for the deaf, and facilities of The Reform Jewish congregation Beth Am, "The People's Temple."
