= Calvary Cemetery =

Calvary Cemetery (Note: Such cemeteries are named after Calvary, the location, according to Christianity's four canonical gospels, where Jesus was crucified.) may refer to:

== French Polynesia ==
- Calvary Cemetery (Atuona)

== United States ==
- Calvary Cemetery (Los Angeles), California
- Calvary Catholic Cemetery (San Jose, California)
- Calvary Cemetery (Evanston, Illinois)
- Calvary Cemetery (South Portland, Maine)
- Calvary Cemetery (St. Louis), Missouri
- Calvary Cemetery (Queens), New York
- Calvary Cemetery (Cleveland), Ohio
- Calvary Cemetery (Youngstown, Ohio)
- Calvary Catholic Cemetery (Enid, Oklahoma)
- Calvary Catholic Cemetery (Pittsburgh), Pennsylvania
- Calvary Cemetery (Memphis), Tennessee
- Calvary Cemetery (Seattle), Washington
- Calvary Cemetery (Tacoma, Washington)
- Calvary Cemetery (Milwaukee), Wisconsin

== See also ==
- Mount Calvary Cemetery (disambiguation)
