= Johannes P. Louw =

South African linguist

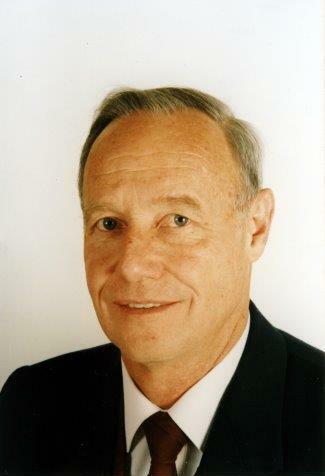
- Born: 31 December 1932; Johannesburg, South Africa
- Died: 23 December 2011 (aged 78); Pretoria, South Africa
- Education: University of Pretoria
- Occupation: Linguist
- Spouse: Rina Watson (m. 1956)

Johannes Petrus Louw (31 December 1932 – 23 December 2011) was the editor of the Greek-English Lexicon of the New Testament Based on Semantic Domains (UBS, 1988, with Eugene Nida). He also developed an approach to linguistics which became known as South African Discourse Analysis.

== Biography ==
Louw was born in Johannesburg, South Africa, on 31 December 1932. He matriculated in 1949 at the Hoërskool Helpmekaar in that city. In 1952 he completed a bachelor's degree cum laude at the University of Pretoria, South Africa, majoring in Greek, Hebrew and sociology. This was followed by a master's degree cum laude in 1954. The title of his thesis was "Die κατοχή in die Memphis papyri" ("The κατοχἠ in the Memphis papyri").

He held the post of lecturer at the University of the Orange Free State Bloemfontein, South Africa, in 1954, becoming the head of the department of Greek at this university in 1966. In 1956 he married Rina Watson. Three children were born from this marriage. He completed his doctoral studies at the University of Pretoria in 1959, with a dissertation entitled "A study of μἠ with the Present Imperative and Aorist Subjunctive". From 1973 to 1992 he was head of the department of Greek at the University of Pretoria. After retiring in 1992, he and Rina moved to Herolds Bay, on the Cape South Coast of South Africa. He died in Pretoria on 23 December 2011. He studied abroad in 1961 (University of Utrecht, Netherlands) and 1971 (Ohio State University, Columbus, Ohio). In 1987 Princeton University offered him a four-year appointment as head of a newly established Translators' Institute. Louw declined, because of political pressure.

Louw remained active retirement. He was a collaborator on the reference Bible being prepared by the Bible Society of South Africa, and was the main translator of the ScriptureDirect Interlinear Greek Bible translation of the New Testament that is available as an app in different formats.

== Academic career ==
During 1960 and 1961, as guest researcher at the University of Utrecht, Netherlands, he studied under professors De Groot, Gonda, Quispel, and Van Unnik. It was here that the foundation for his interest in Linguistics was laid. On returning to South Africa, he founded an academic journal, Acta Academica, and developed an approach to linguistics for which international journals coined the designation South African Discourse Analysis. In 1991 Professor Black of the Lockman Foundation in California described this methodology as the basis of New Testament interpretation.

During a period of research at Ohio State University in Columbus, Ohio, USA, he attended several international conferences. This was an important step towards working with Dr/ Prof Eugene Nida on a new approach to lexicography. In this approach, words were arranged in a lexicon according to semantic categories, rather than according to alphabetical order. The Greek-English Lexicon of the New Testament was published by the United Bible societies in New York in 1988, with four reprints in the first two years. This has become a standard reference work for Bible Translators all over the world.

== Professional Societies and Journals ==
Louw participated in the activities of a number of professional societies, sometimes also serving on the boards of such societies. These included the Classics Society of South Africa, the South African Society for Patristic and Byzantine Studies, and the Linguistics Society of South Africa. He served as editor of the international journal Estudios de Filologia Neotestamentica. He founded the University of Pretoria Center for Interlingual Communication.

== Awards ==
- 1989 – The Pieter van Drimmelin medal (gold) award of The South African Academy for Science and Arts
- 1989 – The Bill Venter award, of which he was the first ever solo recipient. This award was for the best publication at a South African University.
- 1989 – Honorary doctorate from the University of Potchefstroom for Christian Higher Education
- 1990 – Linguistics Society of South Africa Award for Linguistics
- 1991 – Claude Harris Leon Foundation Annual Reward
- 1991 – Percy Fox Foundation Achievement Award
- 1992 – Honorary doctorate from the University of the Free State, South Africa
- 1993 – Honorary doctorate from the University of Pretoria

In 2008 at the centenary celebrations of the University of Pretoria Louw was identified as one of 100 "Leading Minds" of the previous 100 years "in recognition of exceptional achievement in research that has established the University of Pretoria as an internationally recognized research university."

== Bible translation ==
Louw served as collaborator in the final editing of the revised 1983 Afrikaans Bible. He was a consultant in the revision of the Good News Bible. He was invited to serve on the selection committee for scientific publications of the United Bible Societies.

The Bible translation organisation The Word for the World (TWFTW), has been particularly impacted by Louw. Dr Veroni Kruger, founder president of that organisation lectured in Louw's department of Greek at the University of Pretoria, and Professor Louw was also the academic supervisor under whom Veroni studied for his doctorate. Principles learned from him form the basis of TWFTW training program and the organisation's approach to translation to this day. Louw's widow, Rina Louw, decided to donate a large portion of his library to TWFTW, and the books were received from her in August 2013, in Pretoria.

== Academic legacy ==
Johannes P. Louw is well-known internationally for his pioneering work in applying linguistic insights to the study of New Testament Greek. Most well-known of his more than 130 publications is the Greek-English Lexicon Based on Semantic Domains, published by the United Bible Societies in 1988. Johannes Louw and Eugene A. Nida were co-editors of this work. This lexicon has become a standard reference work in Bible translation. Probably his greatest contribution to the study of New Testament Greek was the development of an exact methodology for the analysis of meaning, not only at the lexical level, but also at the level of the sentence and paragraph and even greater units of discourse. This has proved to be a great help to Bible translators all over the world. Through his academic career as a teacher, he exerted tremendous influence in the lives and careers of many students and other academics who worked with him in some or other capacity. Important in this regard is the fact that, in spite of the political isolation of South Africa at the time, students from the United States and Hong Kong studied for their doctorates under him.

Louw influenced on the teaching of exegetical skills to church leaders as an honorary academic adviser to Veritas College International, an organisation that provides church based leadership training in more than 30 countries. He served Veritas. Dr Bennie Wolvaardt, the founding president of Veritas College, was a student of Louw at the University of Pretoria. The semantic discourse analysis of Louw is at the root of the "do it yourself" exegetical approach with which Veritas equips their students .

Another important element in his legacy is his contribution to the ScriptureDirect app for reading and understanding the Greek text of the New Testament. After his retirement, Louw served alongside Dr Bennie Wolvaardt as the main translator for the new Interlinear Greek Bible Translation of the New Testament along with explanations of the Greek forms. For each Greek word of the New Testament the contextual meaning is provided from the Louw/Nida Greek-English Lexicon Based on Semantic Domains.

== Publications ==
Louw contributed to various publications, most notable of which are the following:

- Oxford Companion to the Bible
- Harpers Dictionary of the Bible
- Anchor Bible Dictionary

Altogether more than 130 publications appeared under his name. These include:

=== Journal articles ===
Louw had articles published in the following journals: Die Calvinis, Tussen Ons, Shimla, Acta Classica, Research Report for Human Sciences Research Council, Vrystaatse Biblioteke, Klassieke Nuusbrief, Nederduitse Gereformeerde Teologiese Tydskrif, Tydskrif vir Geesteswetenskappe, Biblical Essays University of Stellenbosch Proceedings, Taalfasette, Klassieke Nuusbrief, Neotestamentica, Proceedings of the African Classical Association, The Bible Translator, Historia, Nederlands Theologisch Tijdschrift, Wiener Studien, Die Admissant, Akroterion, Tydskrif vir Letterkunde, Die Saaier, Vernuwing, Taalseminaar, Acta Academica, South African Journal of Linguistics, Suid-Afrikaanse Tydskrif vir Linguistiek, Die Taalpraktisyn, Scriptura.

=== Contributions to greater works ===
- Pro Munere Gratis (Festschrift Prof Gonin)
- Leksikon en Semantiek (Festchrift H.J.J.M. van der Merwe)
- In en Om die Letterkunde (HAUM 1975)
- Current Issues in Linguistic Theory (Indiana University Press, 1977)
- Die Nuwe Testamentiese Wetenskap Vandag (UP, 1980)
- Die Bybel Leef (SAUK, 1982)
- Fakulteitslesings Universiteit van Pretoria 1983, 1986;
- Die Essensie van Taalhandeling; G.S.Nienaber – ‘n Huldeblyk (1984)
- Linguistevereniging Kongresreferate (1984)
- A South African Perspective on the New Testament (Leiden: Brill 1986)
- Die Taal van die Bybel en die Predikant (NG Kerkboekhandel, 1986)
- Colloque “Bible et Informatique” (Louvain-la-Neuve 1986)

=== The following are publications under his own name ===
- Sophokles Antigone. Commentary by J. P. Louw (Pretoria: Perskor, 1975)
- Semantiek van Nuwe Testamentiese Grieks (Pretoria: Beta Pers, 1976, reprinted 1978)
- Sophokles Elektra. Commentary by J. P. Louw (Pretoria: Perskor 1977)
- Semantiese Struktuuranalise van Romeine, Vol 1 & 2 (Pretoria: Perskor 1978)
- A Semantic Discourse Analysis of Romans, Vol 1 & 2 (Pretoria: Beta Press 1979)
- Fasette van die Hellenisme (Pretoria: Beta Pers 1981 and 1983)
- Lexicography and Bible Translation (Cape Town: Bible Society 1985)
- Sociolinguistics and Communication (Stuttgart: United Bible Societies 1985)
- Veranderde Taalinsigte (Johannesburg: RAU Publikasies)
- Style and Discourse, with E. A. Nida, A. H. Snyman and K. Cronje (Cape Town: Bible Society 1983)
- Greek-English Lexicon Based on Semantic Domains, with E. A. Nida (New York: United Bible Societies 1988)
- Interlinear Greek Bible, with B. P. Wolvaardt (ScriptureDirect – Mobile application software)
- Lexical Semantics of the Greek New Testament, with E. A. Nida (Society of Biblical Literature 1992)
- Semantics of New Testament Greek (Society of Biblical Literature 1997)
