= Radziechowy =

- Village
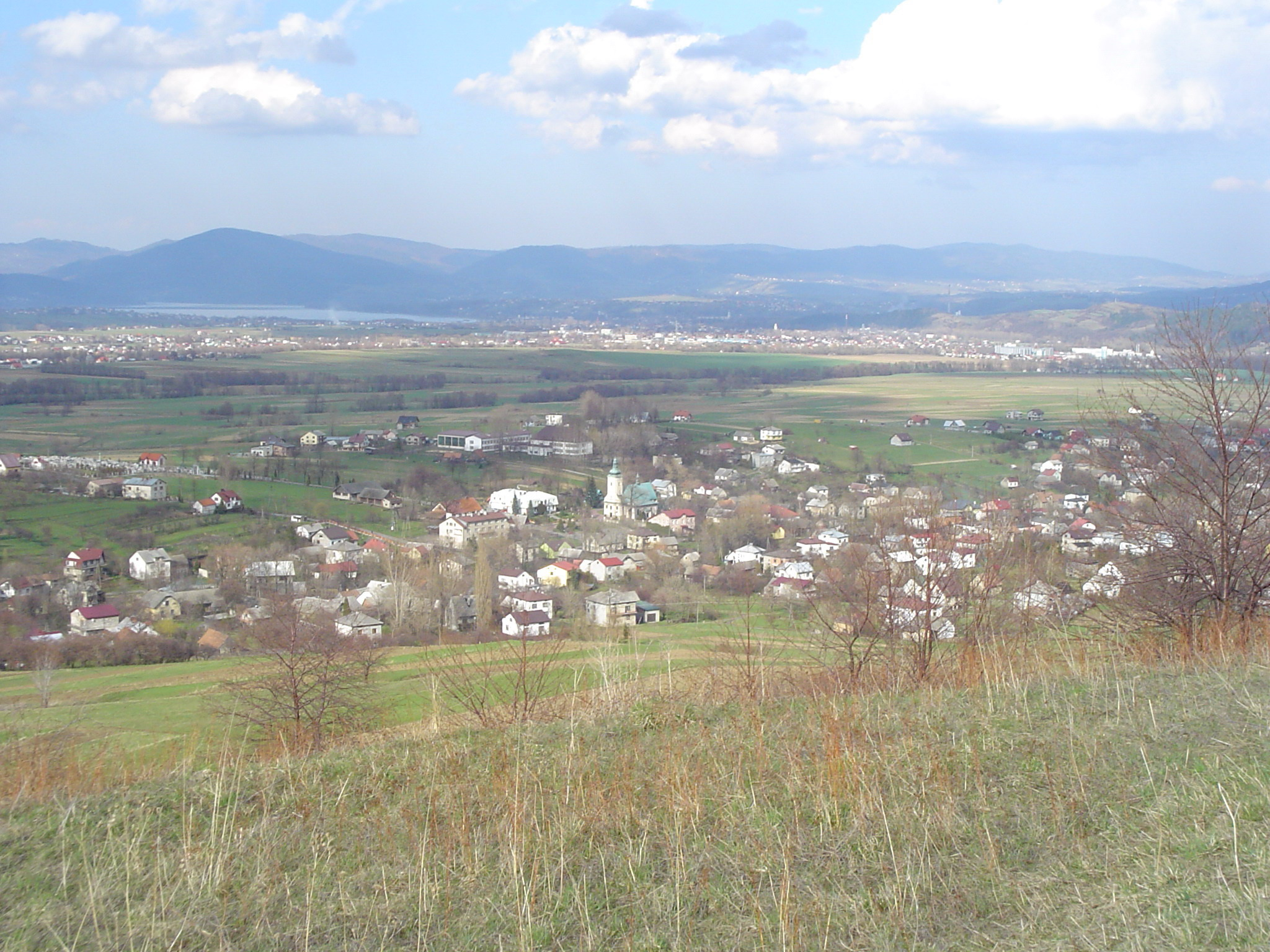
- A view of Radziechowy from Matyska hill

- Location within Poland
- Coordinates: 49°38′48″N 19°7′33″E
- Country: Poland
- Voivodeship: Silesian
- County: Żywiec
- Gmina: Radziechowy-Wieprz
- Established: early 14th century
- Highest elevation: 560 m (1,840 ft)
- Lowest elevation: 380 m (1,250 ft)
- Population: 5,000

Radziechowy [rad͡ʑɛˈxɔvɨ] is a village in the administrative district of Gmina Radziechowy-Wieprz, within Żywiec County, Silesian Voivodeship, in southern Poland.

It is one of the oldest villages in Żywiec Basin. It was established in the first half of the 14th century.

== Landmarks ==
- St. Martin's Church (from the 16th century)
- Golgotha of the Beskids (Polish: Golgota Beskidów) - Way of the Cross
