= Calvaria =

Calvaria can refer to any of the following:

- The Latin name of Calvary, the site of Jesus's crucifixion
- Kalwaria (disambiguation) or Kalvarija (disambiguation), places named after Calvary
- Calvaria (skull), a portion of the skull forming the roof of the cranial cavity
- Calvaria, a former scientific generic name of some tropical trees including the tambalacoque tree (Sideroxylon grandiflorum)
- Various types of skullcaps, such as the kippah, topi, or zucchetto.

== See also ==
- Calvary (disambiguation)
