= Manoug Exerjian =

Ottoman-born American architect

- Born: 1888; Constantinople, Ottoman Empire (now Istanbul, Turkey)
- Died: November 5, 1974 (aged 86); North Shore University Hospital; Manhasset, New York, United States
- Education: Royal School of Architecture
- Occupation: Architect
- Known for: Architecture
- Spouse: Arax
- Children: 2

Manoug Exerjian (August 20, 1892 or 1888 – November 5, 1974) was an Armenian American architect.

== Biography ==
A native of Constantinople, he graduated from the Royal School of Architecture in Istanbul in 1914, before immigrating to the United States later that year. He opened an architectural practice in Great Neck, New York a few years later, in 1923. designed the original campus of Manhasset (North Shore University) Hospital on Northern Boulevard (NY 25A) in Manhasset, New York.

He came to prominence after winning first prize, $750, in a competition for best design of a Broadway (Manhattan) block front. Specifically, the contest featured hypothetical drawings of the east side of Times Square, between 44th Street and 45th Street. Exerjian resided at 147 East 33rd Street (Manhattan) when his plan was victorious in December 1933.

=== Career as designer ===
Exerjian owned and designed four houses located at Cannon Place, near 288th Street, the Bronx, in 1927. He owned several plots of land on lower Lexington Avenue (Manhattan), which were purchased from him in February 1929.

In March 1934 Exerjian advised that $25,000,000 in allocated United States Federal Government funds be used to make alterations in existing dwellings on the Lower East Side. He stressed that the same sum of money, when used to build several blocks of new housing, would perpetuate the existence of slums much longer. This would occur because private capital would not be capable of competing profitably with tax exempt housing.

Exergian designed a group of three apartment houses on Queens Boulevard between 66th Avenue and 67th Drive, in Forest Hills, New York. Designed in the six story garden style, in 1937, the three apartment units covered a block measuring 600 feet. 212 apartments and 14 stores were planned for the area.

As president of Houses For Modern Living, Inc., Exerjian built and sold 24 lots, three blocks from the Eighth Avenue subway, in November 1940. The development was on the south side of Austin Street, east of Yellowstone Boulevard, in Forest Hills. Prior to this, he built and sold several private homes in the area.

=== Death ===
Exerjian died in November 1974, at the age of 86, at North Shore University Hospital in Manhasset, New York.

== Personal life ==
Exerjian was married to his wife, Arax. They had two daughters and five grandchildren.

At the time of his death, he resided at 18 Bonnie Heights Road – a home he designed – located within the nearby village of Flower Hill.

== Works ==
- 1927: Four houses located at Cannon Place, near 288th Street, the Bronx
- 1934: Crypt of Holy Cross Armenian Apostolic Church (New York City)
- 1937: Three six-story apartment houses on Queens Boulevard between 66th Avenue and 67th Drive, in Forest Hills, New York
- 1952-1953: Renovation and refacing of Holy Cross Armenian Apostolic Church (New York City)

Exerjian also designed the original North Shore University Hospital in Manhasset, New York.

== See also ==
- Frank Genese
- William Haugaard
- Henry Johanson
