= National Temple =

Church building in Lagos State, Nigeria

- Interactive map of National Temple
- Location: Lagos State, Nigeria
- Coordinates: 6°35′19″N 3°23′20″E
- Public transit: Ikorodu

Construction
- Built: 32 years
- Cost: ₦undisclosed

The National Temple is the church building of The Apostolic Church Nigeria, which is located in Olorunda-Ketu, Lagos State. It has 20,000 Sholex seats.

== History ==
In 1969, the annual Lagos, Western and Northern Areas (LAWNA) Convention which was usually held in Ebute Metta was moved to Orishigun, a town in Ketu due to the rapid rate of increasing converts. In 1970, the convention was moved to the present location in Olorunda-Ketu and 1976 annual conventions started holding place in what is now known as the Old Convention Hall.

In 1979, the first LAWNA Territorial Chairman, S. G. Adegboyega, laid the foundation of what was to be the National Temple. In 1994, Samuel Jemigbon made rapid progress in the construction of the structure in his tenure as the third LAWNA Territorial Chairman.

The National Temple was completed on 19 November 2011 under the pastorship Gabriel Olutola who described it as "the House built with prayers" and "a symbol of the church's unification." It has a capacity of 100,000 seats

== See also ==
- List of the largest evangelical church auditoriums
