= Holy Cross Armenian Apostolic Church (New York City) =

Church in Manhattan, New York

Coordinates: 40°51′9.36″N 73°55′49.94″W

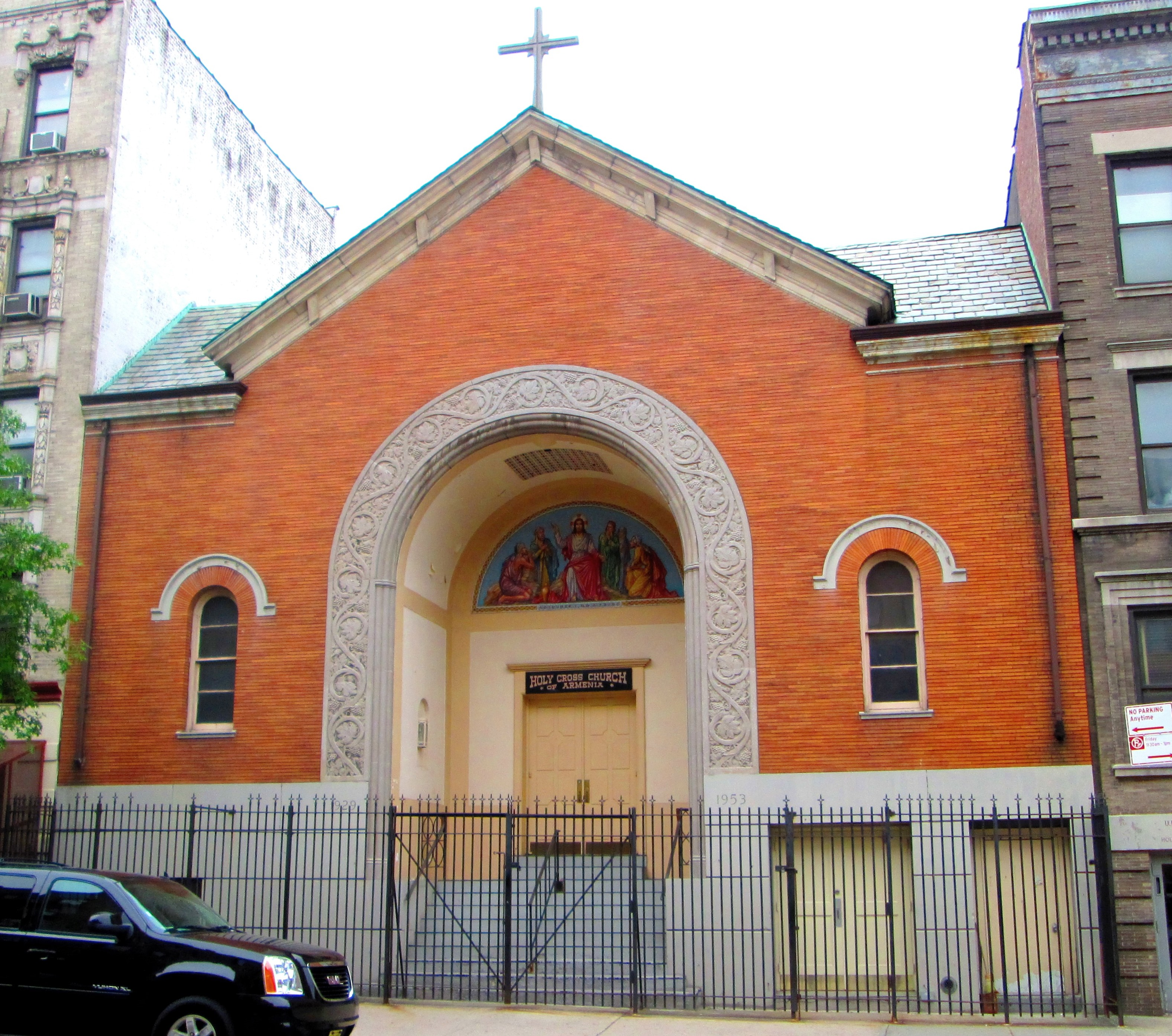
- Interactive map of the Holy Cross Armenian Apostolic Church area

General information
- Location: New York, New York, United States of America
- Construction started: 1925 (for church), 1934 (for crypt), 1952 (for renovation)
- Completed: 1926 (for church), 1934 (for crypt), 1953 (for renovation)
- Cost: $30,000 (budgeted for 1925 church construction)
- Client: The Lutheran Church of Our Saviour (1925); The Armenian Apostolic Church (1952)

Design and construction
- Architects: Stoyan N. Karastoyanoff of 220 Audubon Avenue (for 1925-1926 church). Manoug Exerjian (for 1934 crypt and 1952-1953 renovation)

Holy Cross Armenian Apostolic Church is a significant Armenian Apostolic Church in Washington Heights, Manhattan, New York City, at 580 West 187th Street.

== Description ==
The church occupies the former second location of the Lutheran church of The Lutheran Church of Our Saviour, established in 1897 as a mission church of St. John's Evangelical Lutheran Church and built in its second location at West 187th Street.

=== History ===
The church building was built between 1925 and 1926 at a cost of $30,000 to designs by an architect Stoyan N. Karastoyanoff of 220 Audubon Avenue. The Lutheran congregation moved into their parish house after the Great Depression, and the Armenian Apostolic Church took over the building in 1929.

On December 24, 1933, a group of assassins attacked Eastern Diocese Archbishop Levon Tourian as he walked down the aisle of Holy Cross Armenian Church in the Washington Heights neighborhood of New York City during the Divine Liturgy, and killed him with a butcher knife. Nine Tashnags were later arrested, tried and convicted. The incident divided the Armenian community, as Tashnag sympathizers established congregations independent of Mother See of Holy Etchmiadzin, declaring loyalty instead to the Holy See of Cilicia based in Antelias, Lebanon.

After the assassination, the church was reconsecrated, with a new crypt added in 1934 to designs by Manoug Exerjian, who also refaced and renovated the church between 1952 and 1953.
