= Calvaire =

Calvaire may refer to:

- Calvaire, French for Calvary
- Calvaire (film), also known as The Ordeal, a Belgian horror film
- Calvary (sculpture), a form of sculptural crucifix found in Brittany

== See also ==
- Calvary (disambiguation)
- Le Calvaire, an 1886 novel by Octave Mirbeau
