= Isaiah Sakpo =

Nigerian Christian clergyman, evangelist and writer

- Born: Isaiah Ghele Sakpo; 12 October 1912; Uzere, Isoko South, Delta State, Nigeria
- Died: 2 August 1993 (aged 80); Lagos State, Nigeria
- Occupations: clergyman; writer
- Years active: 1927–1993

Isaiah Ghele Sakpo (12 October 1912 – 2 August 1993) was a Nigerian Christian clergyman, evangelist, and writer. Regarded as one of the pioneering fathers of Christianity in Nigeria, he once served as Lagos, Western/Northern Areas (LAWNA) Territorial chairman and vice-president of The Apostolic Church Nigeria.
