= Stoyan N. Karastoyanoff =

American architect

Stoyan Karastoyanoff
- Born: Stoyan Nikolov Karastoyanov; 10 December 1870; Yambol, Ottoman Bulgaria
- Died: 16 July 1931 (aged 61); Manhattan, New York, USA
- Other names: Stoyan Kara Stoyanoff
- Known for: Architect

Stoyan Nicholas Karastoyanoff, AIA (Bulgarian: Стоян Николов Карастоянов; 10 December 1870 – 16 July 1931) was a Bulgarian-American architect practicing in New York City in the early twentieth century. He immigrated to the United States in 1903. He is best known as the architect of the current Holy Cross Armenian Apostolic Church (New York City). In the 1910s he practiced from 114 East 28th Street before moving uptown to 220 Audubon Avenue, Washington Heights, Manhattan, roughly following the concurrent migration of German immigrants there of whom many where his clients.

== Works ==
- 1917: Bashein Garrage, 376 West 213TH Street, a single-storey brick garage for $20,000
- 1917: Arras Garage & Auto Supply Co, 4892-4 Broadway, single-storey brick storage & warehouse for $25,000.00
- 1925: Norwegian Free Mission Church Sunday School, 461 West 166TH Street, single-storey brick Sunday School with a rubberoid roof (bitumen?) for $15,000
- 1925-1926: The Evangelical Lutheran Church of our Savior, 578-580 West 187th Street, now the Holy Cross Armenian Apostolic Church (New York City) since 1929.
