= Leon Tourian =

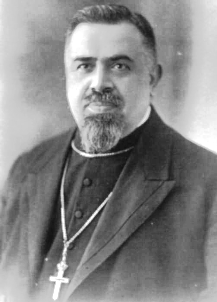
Tourian

Archbishop Leon Tourian (sometimes also Turian; Armenian: Ղեւոնդ Դուրեան; 29 December 1879 – 24 December 1933) was a cleric of the Armenian Apostolic Church. Appointed primate of the Eastern Diocese of the Armenian Apostolic Church of America in 1931, with jurisdiction over an estimated 250.000 Armenians in North and South America. He was assassinated in New York City by Armenian Revolutionary Federation members. Tourian's murder was part of a conflict within the diaspora of the Armenian Apostolic Church in the United States and an example of cross-border sectarianism.

== Early ministry ==
Tourian was born in Istanbul, Ottoman Empire. Tourian was archbishop of Smyrna, Vicar Patriarch of Constantinople, and later a prelate in Greece, Bulgaria, and, Armenian Archbishop of England.

== North American ministry ==
Archbishop Tourian was appointed to head the Eastern Diocese of the Armenian Church in New York in 1931. At first, American newspapers covered Tourian's visits as positively and pleasant. Newspapers reported his career and the honors local mayors attributed to him. During the summer of 1932, this perspective and tone changed. Newspapers emphasized that Armenia was a Soviet republic, that Tourian's authority came from the Echmiadzin See located there. Newspapers began calling him a communist sympathizer.

The incident that resulted in a plot to assassinate the archbishop took place on 1 July 1933, in a pavilion for the celebration of Armenian Day at the Century of Progress Exposition in Chicago. Archbishop Tourian, upon his arrival to deliver an invocation, ordered the removal of the red, blue, and orange Tricolor of the First Republic of Armenia (1918–20) from the stage before he would step out on it.

From the archbishop's point of view, appearing beside this flag would provoke the wrath of Armenia's Soviet government, which was a serious concern, since the church's ultimate seat of spiritual authority lay in the Holy See at Etchmiadzin, within the borders of Soviet Armenia, and the Catholicos of All Armenians felt bound to keep peace with Soviet authorities.

However the members of the nationalist Armenian Revolutionary Federation (ARF), known as Dashnaks, for whom the flag was a sacred symbol of the Armenian nation, took this as an act of treason. The Armenian language newspaper Hairenik – which had close ties with ARF – started publishing threatening letters for Tourian's life. The newspaper even offered a $100 reward to someone who will "teach Tourian a lesson". Later on Tourian asked for police protection.

Tourian was soon attacked by five ARF members in Worcester, Massachusetts. Two of the attackers were convicted. After this incident Tourian hired a bodyguard.

== Death ==
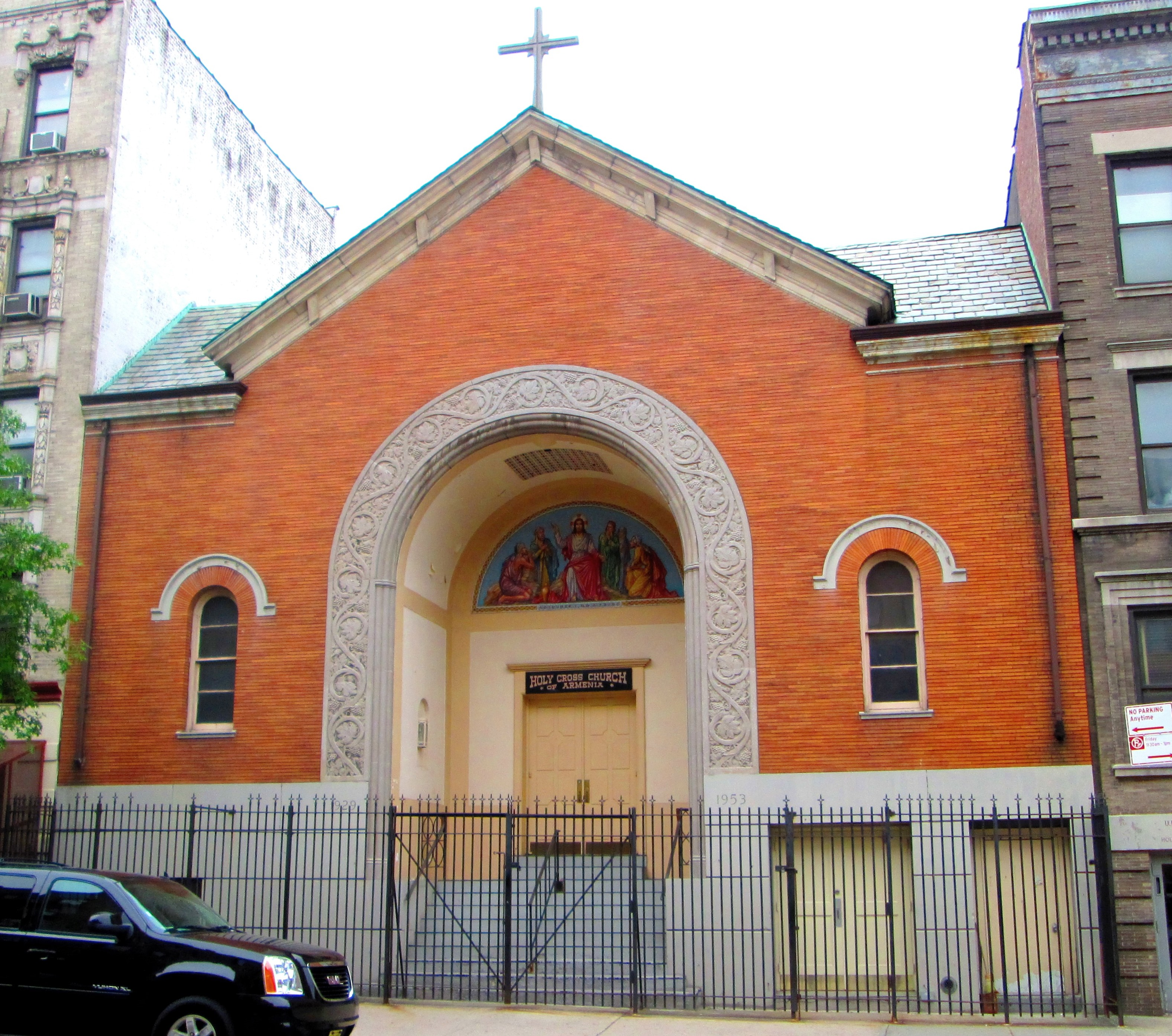
Holy Cross Church at 580 West 187th Street in the Washington Heights neighborhood of Manhattan, New York City was the scene of Tourian's assassination

Tourian was assassinated on December 24, 1933, when several men attacked him in the Church of the Holy Cross, in Washington Heights, Manhattan, at the start of the Christmas Eve service. Tourian’s constant bodyguard, Kossof Gargodian, was sitting in the back of the church certain that there would be no assault upon Tourian in a holy place, on the day before Christmas.

When, at the end of the procession, the archbishop passed the fifth row of pews from the rear, he was suddenly surrounded by a group of at least nine men. Two men stabbed Tourian with large butcher knives, and once the archbishop fell, the attackers scattered and mixed with the crowd. Two of the assailants were seized by the parishioners, beaten, and subsequently handed over to the police.

The police soon apprehended the other seven assailants, who were all ARF members. On July 14, 1934, after a trial that lasted five weeks, two of them, Mateos Leylegian and Nishan Sarkisian, were found guilty of first degree murder, and the other seven of first degree manslaughter. Leylegian and Sarkisian were sentenced to death, but Governor of New York Herbert Lehman commuted the death sentences to life imprisonment "on account of most unusual circumstances in this case". The other seven were given prison terms of varying lengths, from 10 to 20 years. After the murder, Tourian's supporters kept around 300.000 Armenians out of Armenian churches across the United States. They could not marry, baptize their children or hold funerals. This lasted 25-years. Change began in 1957. The Holy see of Cicilia in Lebanon agreed to take these congregations in. Its leader, Zareh I, accepted on October 8th and send archbishop Khoren to the United Stated on October 17th. From this point in time, there were two separate Armenian Apostolic authorities in the country, as there still are today.

== Aftermath ==
After the killing, American Armenian followers of the Armenian Apostolic Church became split between local churches affiliated with the Catholicosate of All Armenians (Mother See of Holy Etchmiadzin), located at the time in Soviet Armenia, and those affiliated with the Catholicosate of Cilicia, in Antelias, near Beirut, Lebanon, though the liturgy has stayed the same. Individual congregations became either entirely Dashnak or anti-Dashnak in their membership, with forcible expulsions and violent fights in some instances. For decades to come, Armenians of the Dashnak persuasion would hold the nine Dashnak defendants to be innocent scapegoats and Archbishop Tourian to be a traitor to his nation, while non-Dashnak Armenians would consider the nine suspects and the entire Dashnak party responsible for the crime. After the death of Tourian, his followers blocked other Armenian believers from entering churches, due to their supposed resistance to Soviet Armenia, highlighting the growth of political sectarianism within the diaspora.

At present there are two Armenian church structures in the United States: the Mother See of Holy Etchmiadzin, which is divided into the Eastern and Western Dioceses of the Armenian Church of America; and the Holy See of Cilicia, which is divided into the Eastern and Western Prelacies of the Armenian Apostolic Church of America.

The murder of Tourian by political extremists provides an example of an international sectarian conflict along political lines within the same sect. In the Armenian diaspora there were different political ambitions about alignment with either the Mother See of Holy Etchmiadzin or the Catholicosate of Cilicia, leading to a 'sectarianization' and ultimately division of the diaspora.
