= Calfaria Chapel, Penygroes =

Chapel in Penygroes, Carmarthenshire, Wales

Coordinates: 51°41′41″N 3°53′50″W

Calfaria is a Baptist chapel in the village of Penygroes in the community of Llandybie, near Ammanford, Carmarthenshire. Services at Calfaria were conducted in the Welsh language until recently but are now bilingual.

== History ==
Calfaria was founded in 1896 by Baptists who worshipped at other chapels in the vicinity and miners who had migrated to the areas to work at the Emlyn and Caerbryn collieries. They originally met in each other's homes and then in a small ramshackle building, later known as the Hen Sied y Band (Old Band Shed). The small congregation grew rapidly, and a minister, the Rev Job Herbert, was installed two years before the chapel was built.

Herbert remained minister for forty years. He was succeeded by Handel Turner (1942–46), E. Bryn Jones (1947–56), Elwyn Williams (1957–63), Wynn Vittle (1964–73) and Carl Williams (1975–82). The current minister (2020) is Aled Maskell.

== Sources ==
- Llawlyfr Undeb Bedyddwyr Cymru, Rhydaman a'r Cylch (in Welsh). 1981.
