= Calvary Presbyterian Church (Staten Island) =

- U.S. National Register of Historic Places
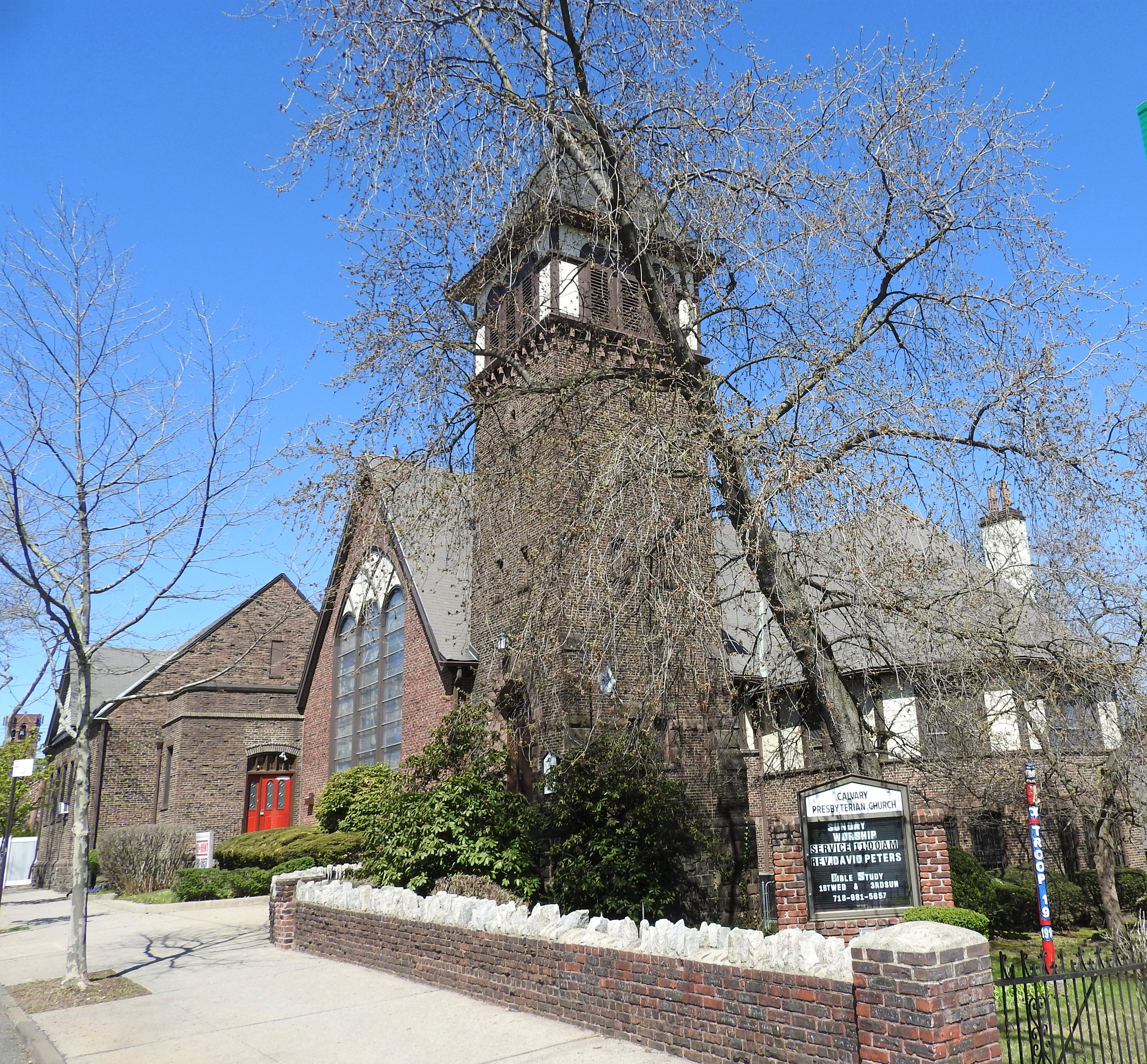
- Calvary Presbyterian Church, April 2018

- Location within New York City Location within New York Location within the United States
- Location: 909 Castleton Ave., Staten Island, New York
- Coordinates: 40°38′6″N 74°6′46″W
- Area: less than one acre
- Built: 1894
- Architect: Stephenson & Greene; et al.
- Architectural style: Romanesque, Tudor Revival
- NRHP reference No.: 02001356
- Added to NRHP: November 21, 2002

Calvary Presbyterian Church is a historic Presbyterian church complex at 909 Castleton Avenue in West New Brighton, Staten Island, New York. The complex consists of the Romanesque/Tudor Revival-style church building (built 1894, addition 1952), parish house (1930), manse (1919), and a one car garage.

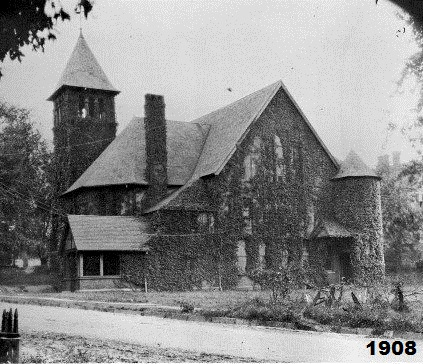
Calvary Presbyterian Church on Staten Island from 1908

Boy Scouts of America have been part of Calvary's Mission since 1984. Today they have a Cub Pack, a Troop and a Venture Crew. Calvary's Scouting Units 19 were founded in West Brighton, Staten Island in 1916 and moved to Calvary in 1984.

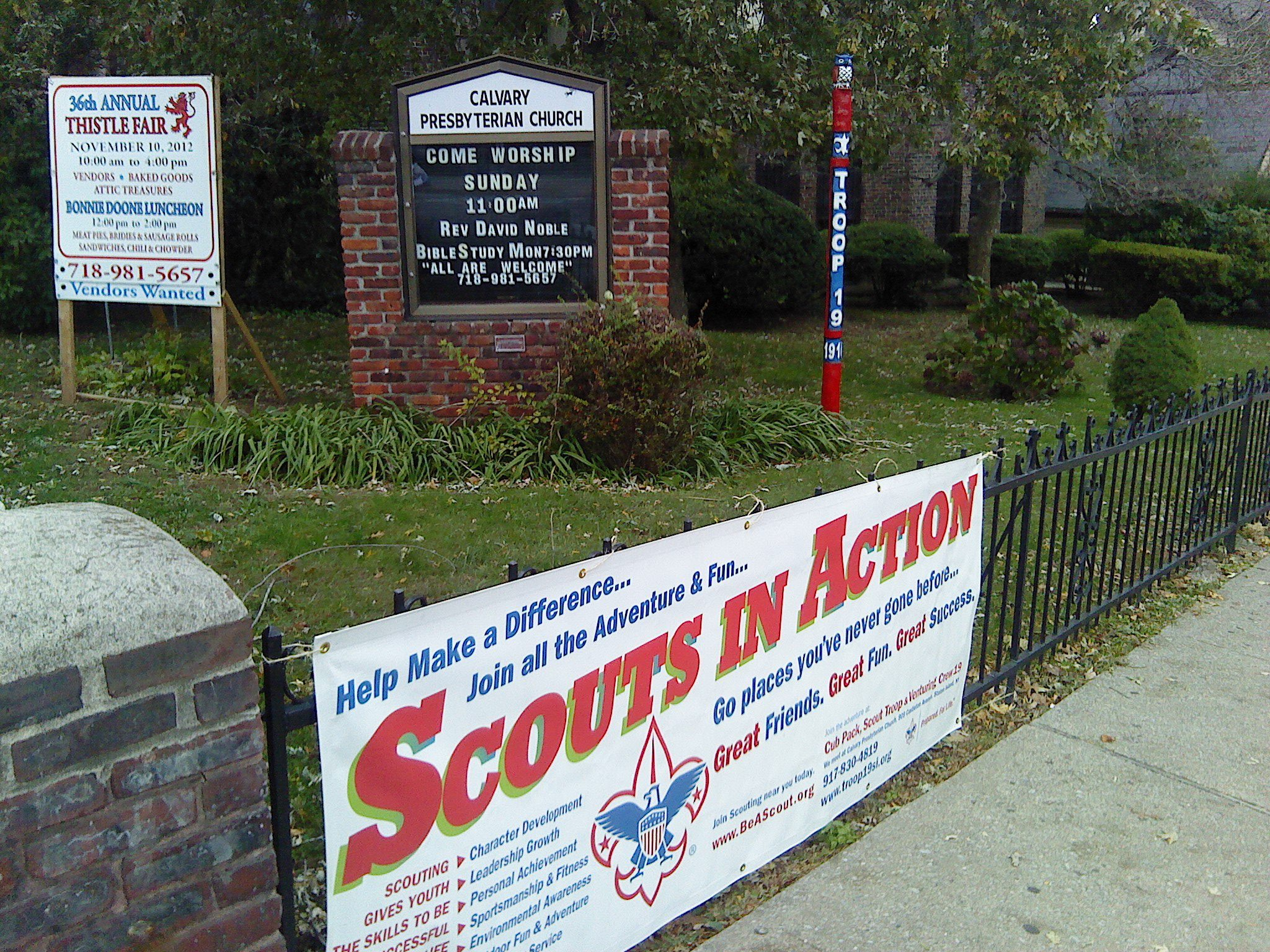
Troop 19's Totem Pole on the Corner of Bement and Castleton Ave at Calvary Presbyterian Church

Calvary was added to the National Register of Historic Places in 2002.

== See also ==
- National Register of Historic Places listings in Staten Island
