= Calvary Memorial Church =

Non-denominational church in Oak Park, Illinois founded 1915

Coordinates: 41°53′18″N 87°47′55″W

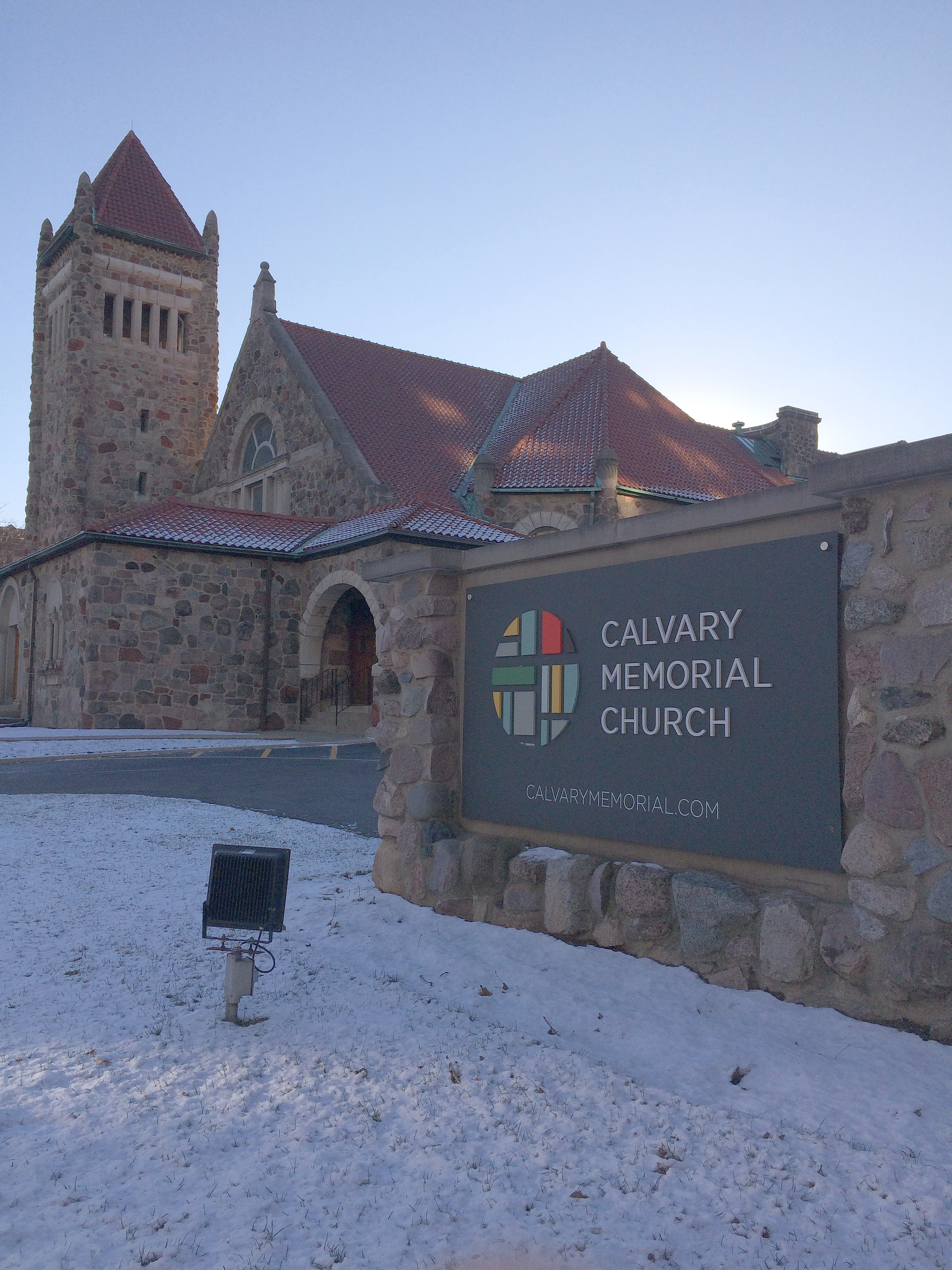
- Calvary Memorial Church
- Calvary Memorial Church
- Location: Oak Park, Illinois
- Country: United States
- Denomination: Non-Denominational, Evangelical Christian
- Website: www.calvarymemorial.com

History
- Founded: 1915

Architecture
- Style: Romanesque

Calvary Memorial Church of Oak Park is a nondenominational church on Lake Street in Oak Park, Illinois, United States.

== History ==
In the winter of 1915, a few families from about five different area churches, representing different denominations and traditions, gathered in a home with the idea of starting a new church. These founders wanted this new church to be free of denominational ties and yet faithful to the Bible. On March 21, 1915, Madison Street Church met for the first time in a rented storefront on Madison Street. Their first budget was less than $100. In 1937, the name was changed to Madison Street Bible Church, and finally in 1959 to Calvary Memorial Church. A fire destroyed much of the facility in 1977, after which the congregation rented facilities for two years until purchasing its existing building on Lake Street in the heart of Oak Park from the First Presbyterian Church.

That existing building is in the Richardsonian Romanesque style, and was modeled on Trinity Church in Boston, with such features as cylindrical towers with conical caps and a clay roof. First Presbyterian Church built the sanctuary in 1902, added a Sunday school building in 1911, and a church house in 1930. Extensive renovations occurred in 1958. Calvary completed its own renovations to the building in 2004.

== Pastors ==
Thirteen men have served Calvary Memorial Church as senior pastor (or its historical equivalent).

- Dr. Louis Talbot (1915–1917)
- Rev. J.C. O'Hair (1917–1920)
- Rev. James Emblen (1924–1926)
- Rev. Robert J. Devine (1926–1933)
- Rev. Arthur H. Fardon (1935–1943)
- Dr. Wayne E. Buchanan (1943–1945)
- Rev. Gordon B. Kemble (1945–1951)
- Rev. John R. Emmans (1952–1958)
- Rev. Robert D. Gray (1958–1974)
- Dr. Donald R. Gerig (1976–1986)
- Dr. Ray Pritchard (1989–2005)
- Dr. Todd A. Wilson (2008–2018)
- Dr. Gerald Hiestand (since 2018)
