= Mount Calvary United Methodist Church =

Church in Manhattan, New York

Coordinates: 40°49′12.1″N 73°56′43.7″W

Mount Calvary United Methodist Church (the Former Evangelical Lutheran Church of the Atonement)
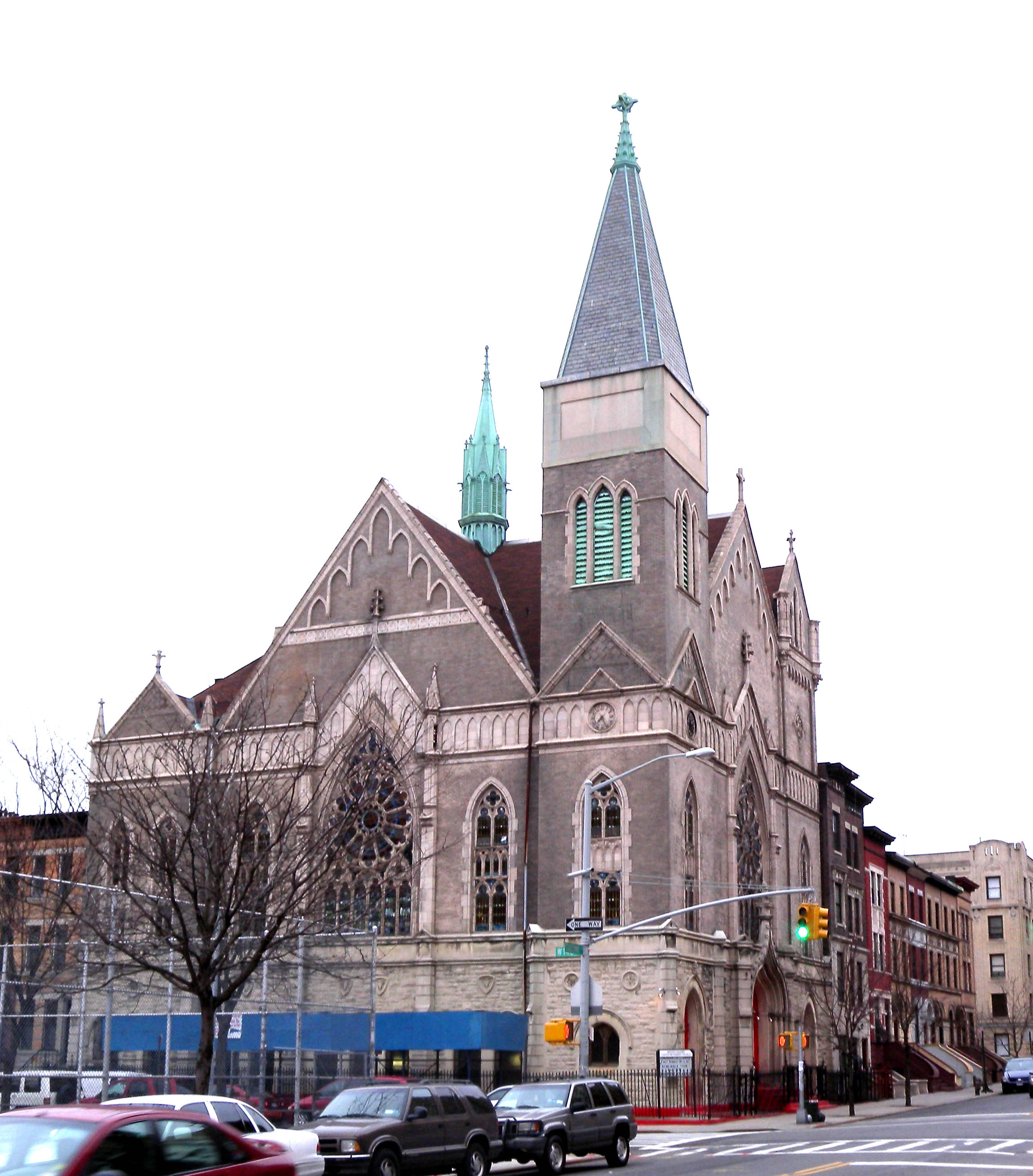
- Interactive map of the Mount Calvary United Methodist Church (the Former Evangelical Lutheran Church of the Atonement) area

General information
- Location: New York, New York, United States of America
- Construction started: 1897
- Completed: 1897
- Client: St. John's Evangelical Lutheran Church Mission of The Evangelical Lutheran Church of the Atonement

Mount Calvary United Methodist Church is a Methodist church in Harlem Village, Manhattan, New York City at 116 Edgecombe Avenue and 140th Street. The congregation occupies the former Lutheran church building of The Evangelical Lutheran Church of the Atonement, which was established in 1896 and built in 1897 as a mission church of St. John's Evangelical Lutheran Church. When Atonement merged with the Lutheran Church of Our Saviour, Atonement's congregation moved into Our Saviour's building at 525 West 179th Street and then 580 West 187th Street.
