= Calvary Episcopal Church (Red Lodge, Montana) =

- U.S. National Register of Historic Places
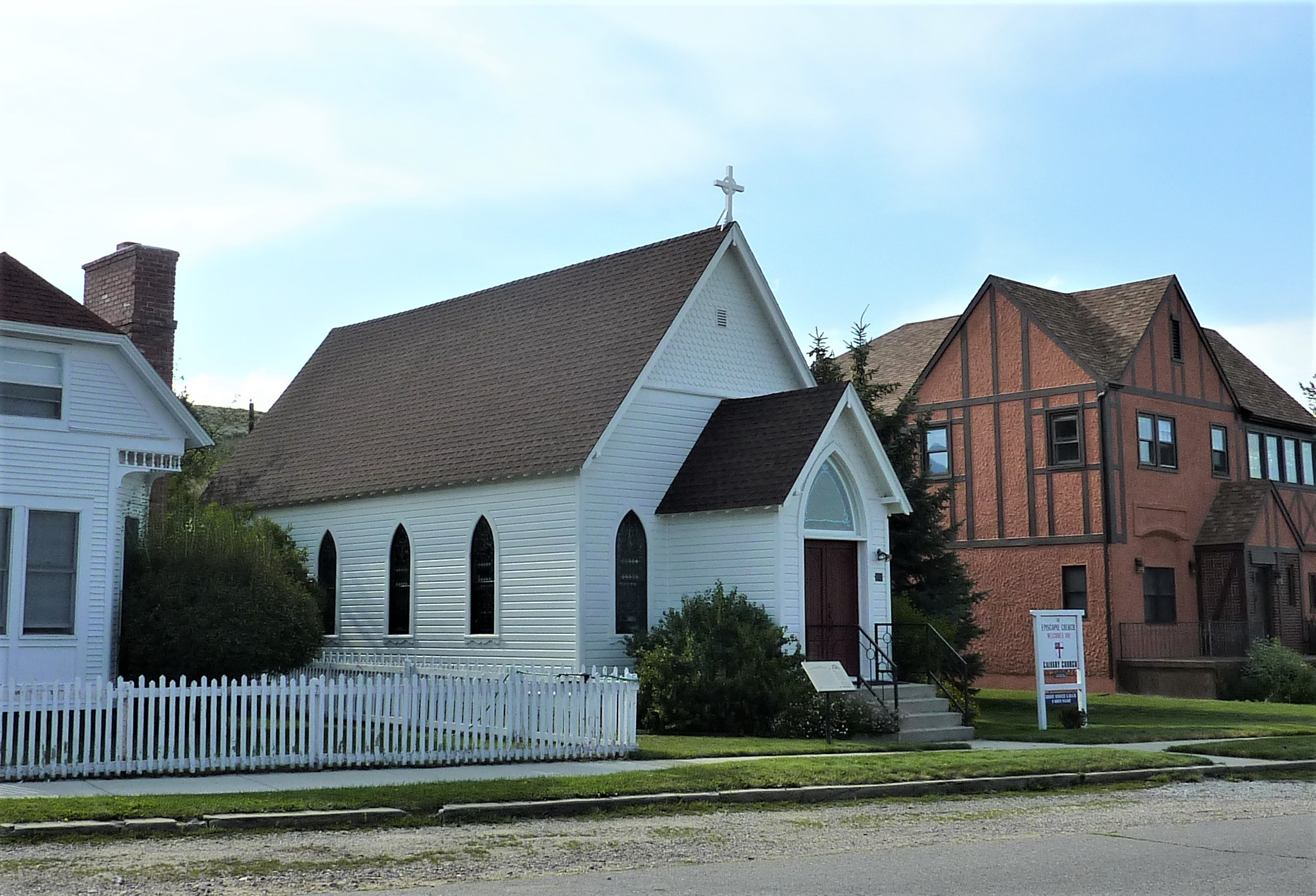
- Calvary Episcopal Church (Red Lodge)

- Location within Montana Location within the United States
- Location: 9 N. Villard Ave., Red Lodge, Montana
- Coordinates: 45°11′16″N 109°14′56″W
- Area: less than one acre
- Built: 1900
- Built by: Donnell, E.S.; Baker, B.B.
- NRHP reference No.: 86002928
- Added to NRHP: October 23, 1986

The Calvary Episcopal Church is an gable-front frame church in Red Lodge, Montana. It is an east-facing one-story church with a projecting gabled vestibule built in 1900 by carpenters E.S. Donnell and B.B. Baker. It was listed on the National Register of Historic Places in 1986.
