= Calvary Reformed Church =

The Calvary Reformed Church (previously called the Presbyterian Evangelical Fellowship) was founded in 1993 by pastor Nelson Owudo. There are 3 congregations in Kampala, Uganda. The church does not ordain women. The church adheres to the Apostles Creed and the Westminster Confession and Westminster Larger Catechism. Church government is Presbyterian.
