= The Apostolic Church Nigeria =

Pentecostal Christian denomination in Nigeria

- Classification: Protestant
- Orientation: Pentecostal
- Theology: Apostolic
- Structure: National Temple
- Leader: Pastor Dr. L. O. Oladele
- Associations: Apostolic Church, Christian Association of Nigeria, Bible Society of Nigeria
- Region: Nigeria
- Origin: 1918; Ijebu Ode, Ogun State
- Separated from: Anglican Diocese
- Branched from: The Apostolic Church, United Kingdom
- Merger of: Diamond Society, then Faith Tabernacle America
- Separations: Christ Apostolic Church
- Congregations: Over 5 million
- Members: 4,500,000 (2018)
- Ministers: 16,000
- Aid organization: Apostolic Prison ministry
- Hospitals: Glorious Vision Hospital
- Tertiary institutions: Glorious Vision University
- Official website: tacn-lawna.org

The Apostolic Church Nigeria is a Pentecostal Christian denomination in Nigeria with its national headquarters in Lagos and international headquarters in Penygroes, South Wales, UK.

== History ==
The church has its origins in the founding of a prayer group called "Precious Stone" in Ijebu Ode by the Anglican leader Joseph Shadare in 1918. In 1922, the group left the Anglican Church. The group joined the Apostolic Church in 1931. In 1938, the denomination counted 120 churches in Nigeria.

In 2011, the denomination inaugurated a 100,000 seat temple called National Temple in Lagos.

In 2018, the church had 4.5 million members in Nigeria.

== Doctrine and belief ==
The Apostolic Church Nigeria is built on a fundamental doctrinal belief based on the Holy Scriptures. Its theological beliefs are summarised in its confession of faith, known as the Tenets.

== Organization and administration ==
The Apostolic Church Nigeria is administered as a single entity by the National Council and it is headed by a president. The current president is Apostle E.S Igwe, who was the chairman of Igboland territory. Igwe succeeded Pastor G.O. Olutola in February 2017. G.O Olutola, who succeeded Eyo Okon in 2011, retired at the age of 80 and handed over the leadership to E.S Igwe.

== Glorious Vision University (formerly Samuel Adegboyega University) ==
In 2011, the church founded Samuel Adegboyega University, a faith-based tertiary institution located in Ogwa, Edo State, Nigeria and named after LAWNA's first territorial chairman Samuel Adegboyega. In 2022, the National University Commission (NUC) approved the university`s change of name from Samuel Adegboyega University to Glorious Vision University.
