= Calvary Episcopal Church (Summit, New Jersey) =

Church in New Jersey, United States

Coordinates: 40.719616°N 74.360254°W

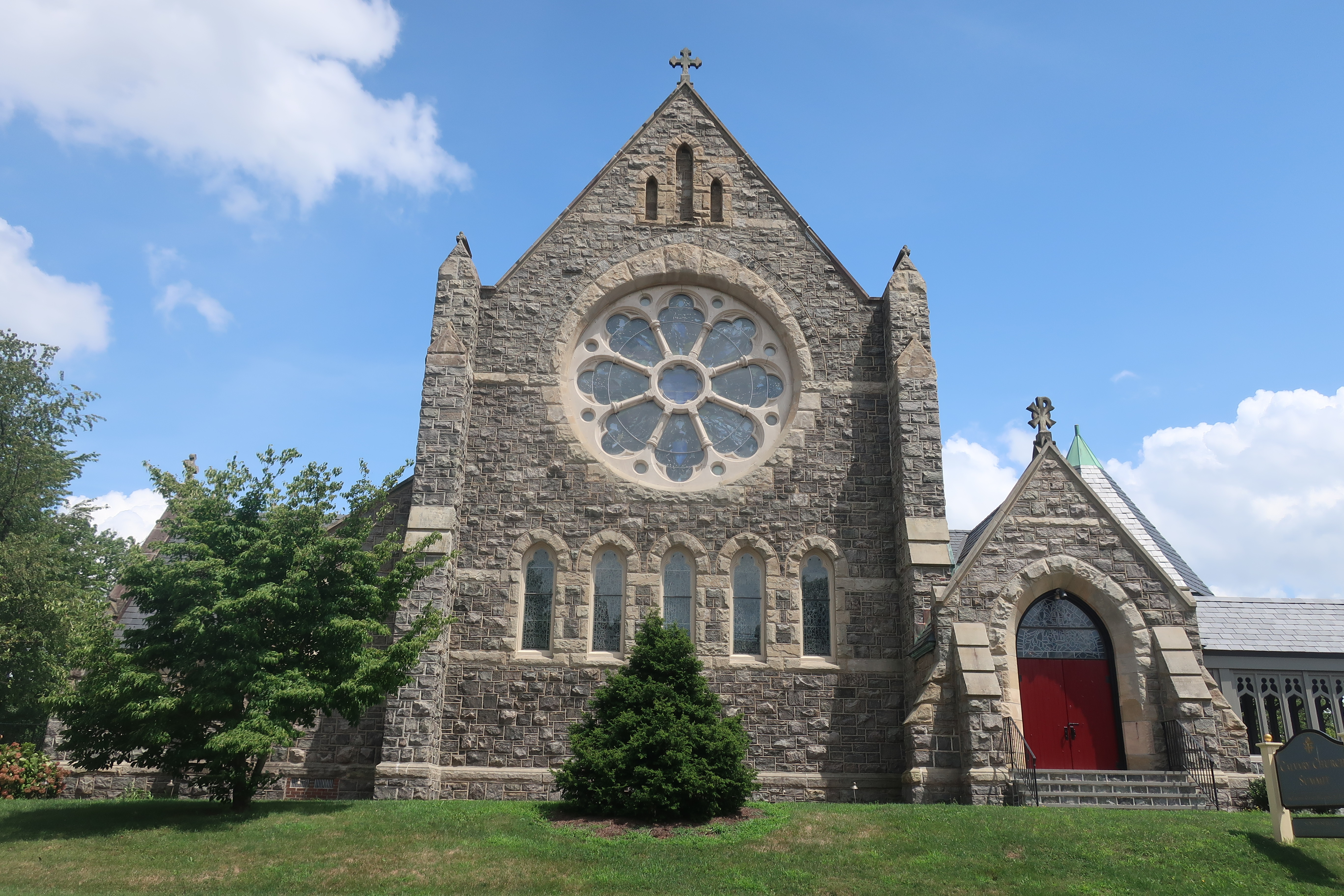
Calvary Episcopal Church in Summit, NJ as seen from Woodland Avenue.

Calvary Episcopal Church is one of the largest Episcopal congregations in New Jersey. It belongs to the Episcopal Diocese of Newark (New Jersey) of the Episcopal Church in the United States of America, a member of the Anglican Communion. The church reported 1,685 members in 2018 and 848 members in 2023. Plate and pledge income reported for the congregation in 2024 was $775,480 with average Sunday attendance (ASA) of 128 persons.

In 1854 when the church began, Summit, New Jersey, was a summer retreat for New York City residents.

One of those residents was the Reverend Thomas Cook, assistant at St. Bartholomew's Episcopal Church, New York. Mr. Cook started Episcopal services in his home in Summit in 1852. As the congregation grew, it built a church in 1854 on Springfield Avenue. The wooden church seated only 75 people, and was the first church of any denomination in Summit. At the time, it was the only public building in Summit besides the train depot.

By 1872 the congregation had outgrown its original building. It built a stone church at the corner of Springfield Avenue and Beechwood Road. This building served the congregation until January 8, 1893. That Sunday morning the rector and sexton lit the gas lamps for the Sunday morning service. The Christmas greens caught fire; the building blazed to ruins in less than an hour.

Under the direction of a new rector, the Reverend Walker Gwynne, the parish purchased land for the present building, at the corner of Woodland and DeForest Avenues. Completed in 1896, the present building, of granite with trimmings of Ohio and Indiana limestone, seats 700.

Calvary Episcopal Church's stained glass windows are notable. The windows on either side of the altar were created by Henry Holiday in 1925. Another 1925 Holiday window, in the nave, depicts Jesus calming the storm.

The rose window employs Tiffany Favrile Glass, from the studio of Louis Comfort Tiffany. Designed by Frederick Wilson, its panes represent the Beatitudes.

== See also ==
NEW CHURCH AT SUMMIT, NJ, New York Times, 9/9/1894
