= Apostolic Church (1916 denomination) =

Pentecostal Christian denomination

- Logo of the Apostolic Church (in the UK)
- Classification: Protestant
- Orientation: Pentecostal
- Theology: Pentecostal theology
- Founder: Daniel Powell Williams
- Origin: 1916; Pen-y-groes and Ammanford, Wales
- Separated from: Apostolic Faith Church

The Apostolic Church is an international Christian denomination and Pentecostal movement that emerged from the Welsh Revival of 1904–1905. Although the movement began in the United Kingdom, the largest national Apostolic Church became The Apostolic Church Nigeria. The term "Apostolic" refers to the role of apostles in the denomination's church government, as well as a desire to emulate 1st century Christianity in its faith, practices, and government.

== History ==
=== Beginning ===
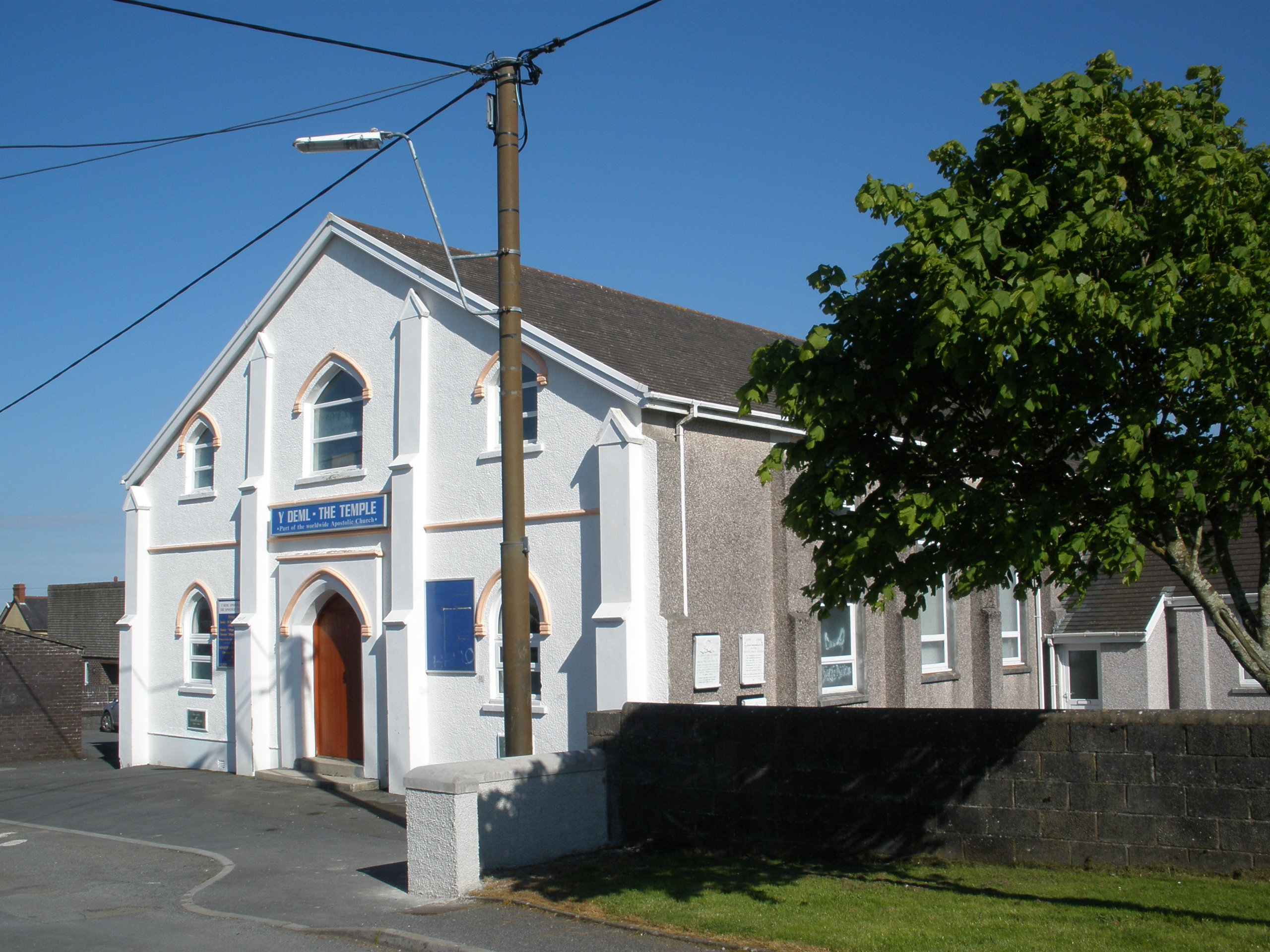
The Apostolic Temple, Pen-y-groes

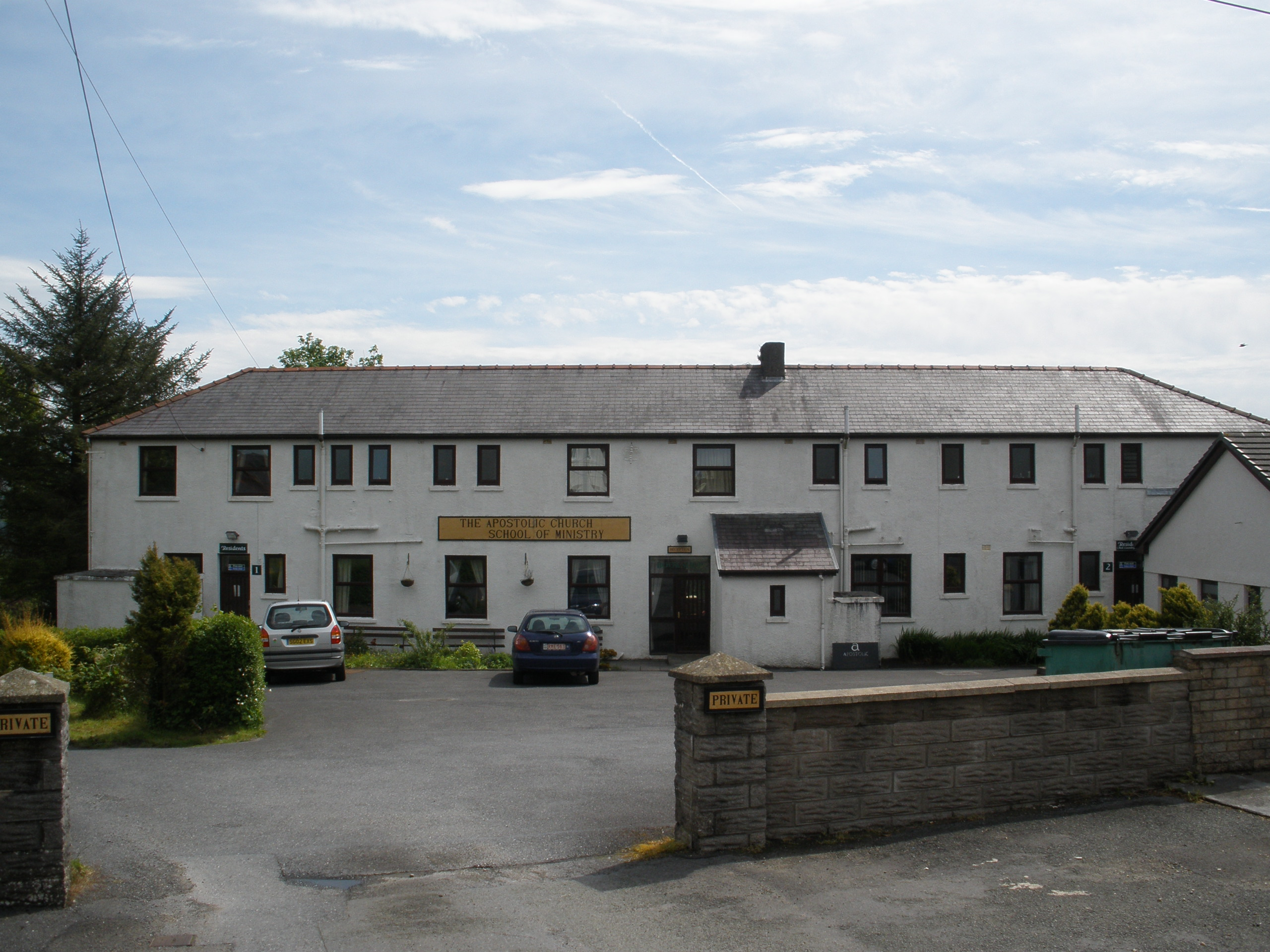
The former Apostolic Church International Bible School, Pen-y-groes

The earliest historians of the Apostolic Church date its beginnings to 1911, when three groups of people in three locations in the village of Penygroes received the Pentecostal baptism in the Holy Spirit. The Apostolic Church had adopted a system of presbyteries to govern the church collegially. While ministers were ordained as apostles, prophets, evangelists, pastors, elders or teachers all were involved in prayer and deliberation together in presbyteries at local, sectional and national levels. The names of these governing bodies eventually became distinct: the presbytery of the local church retained the name "presbytery", the regional body became known as the classis, and later, the Area Pastors' Meeting and the national governing body adopted the name of General Council. Church government was not reserved to the apostles alone, as they were regarded as first among equals (primus inter pares) among the other ministers, requiring a collegial government.

=== Split ===
For a period, the Welsh churches were associated with William Oliver Hutchinson and the Apostolic Faith Church in Bournemouth, England. However, on 8 January 1916, Daniel Powell Williams and most of the Welsh assemblies separated from Hutchinson and the Apostolic Faith Church over doctrinal matters, and established the Apostolic Church in Wales (ACW). After 1916, the two groups had no further contact and developed along different doctrinal paths. Hutchinson had begun to claim all authority as "Chief Apostle", a claim that Williams and the Welsh churches could not accept, seeing his claims to infallibility as contrary to both the Protestant principle of sola scriptura and collegial church government.

=== Post-split continuation ===
In 1917, a second group was formed, centred on Birmingham, affiliated to the Apostolic Church in Wales. The following year the Burning Bush Pentecostal Congregation in Glasgow came into cooperation with the Apostolic Church. In the same year, a group using the name "Apostolic Church" in Hereford also came into cooperation with the ACW. In 2016, the denomination celebrated its 100th anniversary. It had 15 million members in approximately 100 countries.

== Theology ==
Ecclesiology has taken a prominent place in the theology of the movement. The Church is defined as the Body of Christ and the headship of Christ is given prominence. Christ is seen to express his headship through the ministries of apostles, prophets, evangelists, pastors, elders and teachers.

== Colleges ==
The Apostolic Church established its first theological college, the Apostolic Church International Bible School, in the village of Pen-y-groes in 1933. Colleges and seminaries have also been established in eleven other countries.

== Hymnal ==
In the past, the standard hymnal of the Apostolic Church was the Redemption Hymnal, which was produced by a joint committee from the Apostolic Church, the Elim Pentecostal Church, and the Assemblies of God in Great Britain and Ireland.

== See also ==
- List of the largest Protestant bodies
