= Calvary Cemetery (Youngstown, Ohio) =

Cemetery in Mahoning County, Ohio, US

Coordinates: 41°6′0″N 80°41′24″W

- Interactive map of Calvary Cemetery

Details
- Established: 1885
- Location: 248 S. Belle Vista Avenue; Youngstown, Ohio
- Country: United States
- Type: Catholic
- Owned by: Roman Catholic Diocese of Youngstown
- Size: 150 acres (61 ha)
- Website: www.cfcsyoungstown.org
- Find a Grave: Calvary Cemetery
- The Political Graveyard: Calvary Cemetery

Calvary Cemetery is located at 248 Belle Vista Avenue on the west side of Youngstown, Ohio. The cemetery is maintained by the Roman Catholic Diocese of Youngstown. The cemetery is one of the four cemeteries the Diocese oversees in Mahoning, Trumbull, and Stark counties.

Stretching over 150 acres (0.61 km^{2}), Calvary is one of the largest and oldest cemeteries in the tri-county area. The cemetery was established in 1885. Over the next few decades, most of the burials in two cemeteries, The Old Catholic Cemetery known as Rose Hill and The German Catholic Cemetery known as St. Joseph's Church Cemetery, were removed to Calvary Cemetery. This means Calvary has burials of people who died prior to its establishment in 1885.

== Notable burials ==
=== Actors/Actresses ===
- Pat Bilon (1947–1983), actor who played ET in E.T. the Extra-Terrestrial

=== Political ===
- Charles J. Carney (1913–1987), US Congressman
- Michael J. Kirwan (1886–1970), US Congressman

=== Sports ===
- George "Shotgun" Shuba (1924–2014), MLB with the Brooklyn Dodgers

=== Military ===
- Leonard Thom (1917–1946), Executive Officer with John F. Kennedy on PT-109's last mission
- One British Commonwealth war grave, of a Royal Air Force officer of World War II.

=== Others ===
- Dr. Louis Rampona (1904–1986), physician to Albert Einstein, Robert Oppenheimer, and George Gallup
