= Chiesa del Calvario, Santo Stefano di Camastra =

Church in Sicily, Italy

Coordinates: 38.0127°N 14.3476°E

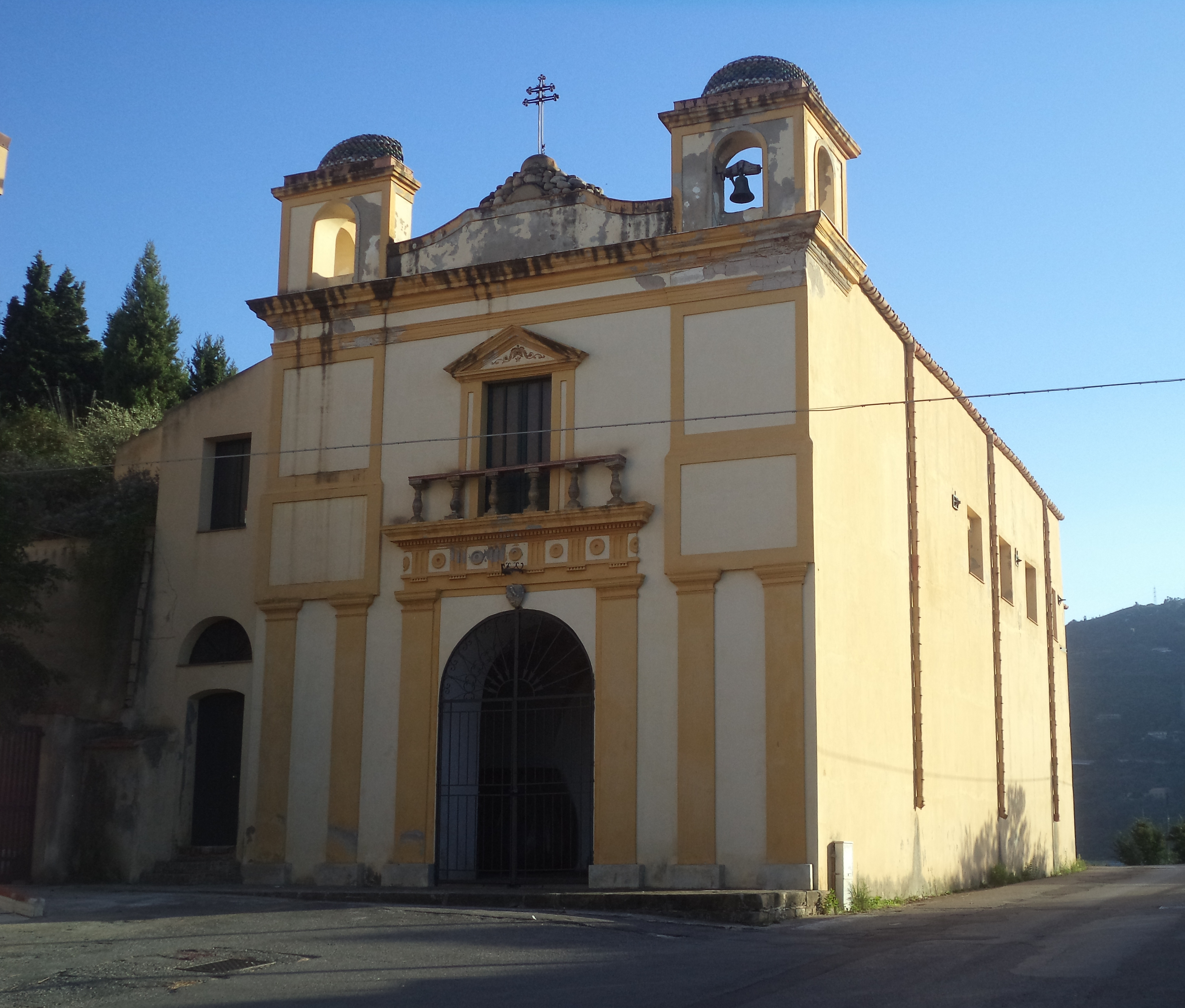

The Chiesa del Calvario ("Church of Calvary") is a church located in Santo Stefano di Camastra in Sicily.

== History ==
The Calvary church is located near the cemetery, in Via Convento, Santo Stefano di Camastra, in the province of Messina in Sicily. Owned by the Sergio family, it was built at the beginning of the 19th century on the site of the former chapel of the Capuchin convent by the future bishop of the diocese of Cefalù, Giovanni Sergio, dedicated to Our Lady of Seven Sorrows. In 1992, it was declared a "property of particular historical and artistic interest" by a regional decree.
