= Gabriel Olutola =

Nigerian-born author, pastor and motivational speaker (1933-2024)

Gabriel Olutola JP

2nd President of The Apostolic Church Nigeria
- In office 3 August 2011 – 29 April 2017
- Preceded by: Eyo Edet Okon
- Succeeded by: Sampson Igwe

Personal details
- Born: Gabriel Oladele Olutola; 4 April 1933 Ilesa, Osun State
- Died: 14 February 2024 (aged 90) Ogun State
- Education: The Apostolic Church International Bible College; Harvard University; University of Ibadan
- Occupation: Pastor; minister
- Profession: Teacher; author
- Gabriel Olutola is the first person to simultaneously hold the post as president of The Apostolic Church and chair, Lagos, Western and Northern Areas (LAWNA).

Gabriel Oladele Olutola (4 April 1933 – 14 February 2024) was a Nigerian-born author, pastor and motivational speaker. He was the former President of The Apostolic Church Nigeria and chairman, Lagos, Western and Northern Areas (LAWNA) after he was inducted simultaneously into both posts in 2011 and 2009 respectively. He also served as the Chancellor of Samuel Adegboyega University. Gabriel Olutola retired on 29 April 2017 and was replaced by Sampson Igwe as President of The Apostolic Church Nigeria and Segun Awojide as the LAWNA Territorial Chairman. Olutola was among the Ijeshan leaders who helped to encourage Pentecostalism in Nigeria. He has been called one of the "notable servants of God" from Osun State. When asked what he would do after his retirement at 84, Olutola said he would continue to work for the Lord. Olutola died on 14 February at the age of 90.
