= Calvary, Virginia =

Unincorporated community in Virginia, US

Coordinates: 38°52′24″N 78°33′06″W

Calvary is an unincorporated community in Shenandoah County, in the U.S. state of Virginia.
