= Calvary Holiness Church =

Calvary Holiness Church could refer to three separate Christian denominations:

- For the mid-20th century holiness denomination in England, see Church of the Nazarene.
- For the Conservative Holiness denomination in the River Brethren tradition, see Calvary Holiness Church (Philadelphia).
- For the Holiness Pentecostal denomination, see Calvary Holiness Association.
