= Calvary (Amstel) =

Painting by Jan van Amstel

Calvary is a 1525-1549 copy of a lost work by Jan van Amstel, now in the Royal Museum of Fine Arts, Antwerp, to which it was bequeathed by Florent van Ertborn in 1849. At that time it was attributed to Pieter Aertsen, though it has later also been attributed to Frans Floris and Gillis Mostaert I.
