= Golgotha of the Beskids =

Coordinates: 49.6467°N 19.1258°E

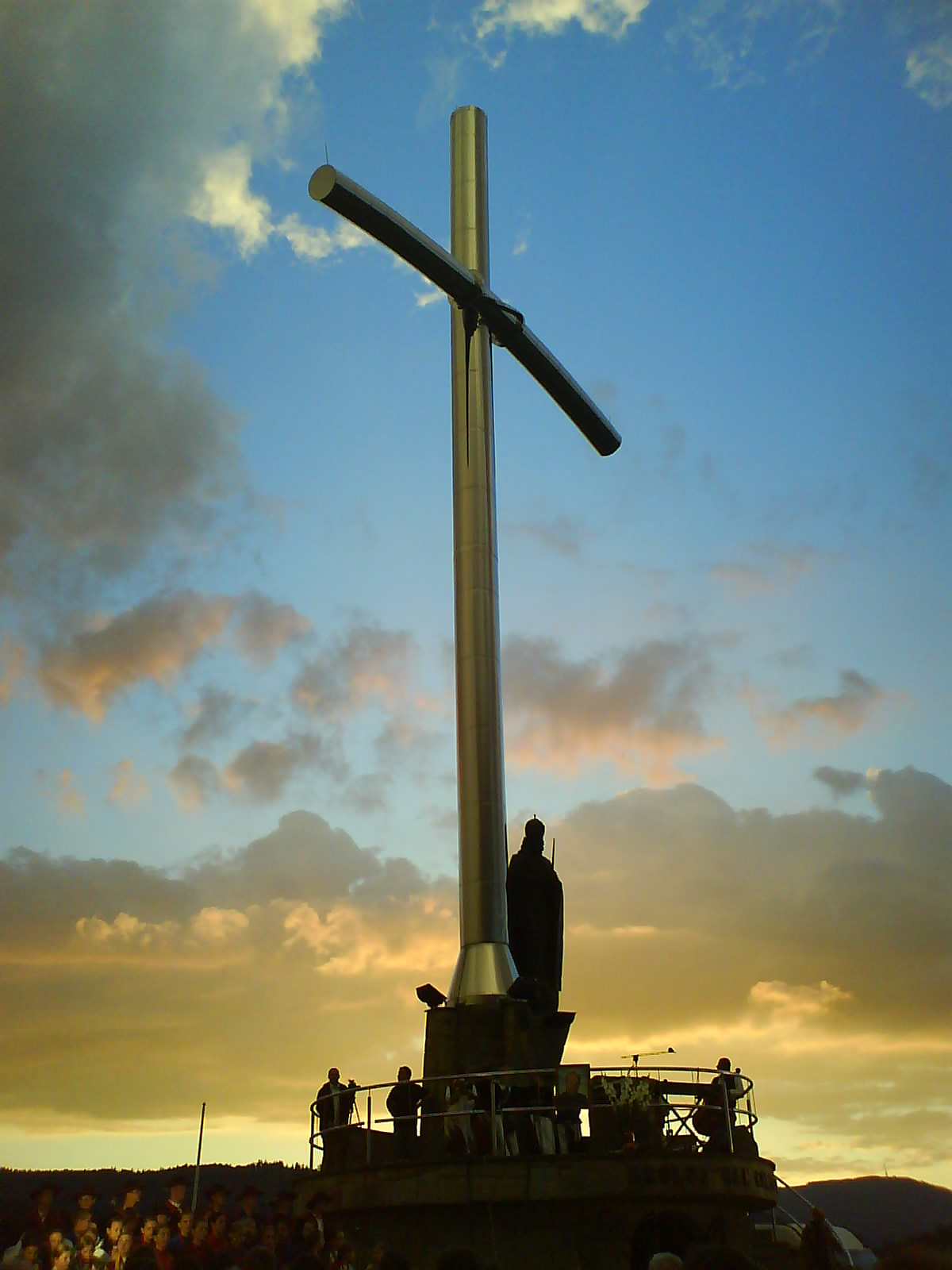
The Millennium Cross on the Matyska in Radziechowy

The Golgotha of the Beskids (Polish: Golgota Beskidów) is a Way of the Cross on the Matyska hill in the Radziechowy village, near Żywiec, in the Silesian Beskids of south Poland.

== See also ==
- Millennium Cross, in North Macedonia
- Soko Grad cross, in Serbia
