= Calvary of Hendrik van Rijn =

14th c. panel painting

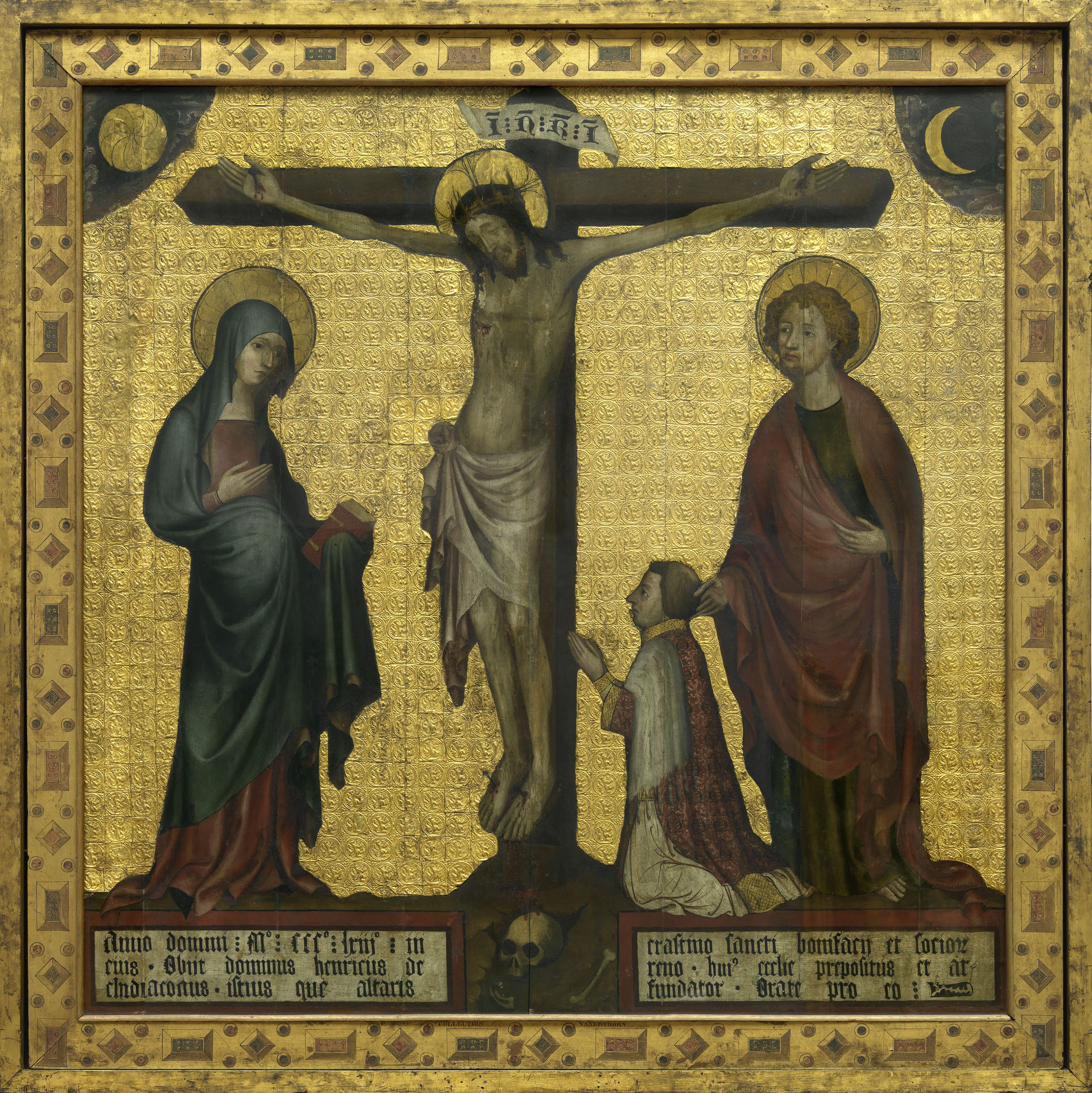
Calvary of Hendrik van Rijn

The Calvary of Hendrik van Rijn or Hendrik van Rijn Crucifixion is one of the earliest surviving panel paintings produced in the Low Countries. It is catalogued number 519 in the Royal Museum of Fine Arts, Antwerp.

It was commissioned from an unknown master painter in 1363 by Hendrik van Rijn, archdeacon of Utrecht. The work was produced in Utrecht, though the painter may have been a travelling artist from northern France or the southern Netherlands. It is an 'epitaph' or 'memorial panel' which hung above van Rijn's grave in the city's St. Janskerk. Its Latin inscription translates as "In the Year of Our Lord 1363, on the [feast] day of Saint Boniface and his companions, Lord Hendrik van Rijn, provost and archdeacon of this church and founder of this altar, died. Pray for him".
