= Bryn Calfaria =

Bryn Calfaria ("Calvary Hill") is a Welsh hymn tune written in 8,7,8,7,4,4,4,7,7 meter. The melody by William Owen is used as a setting for several hymns, most notably the English hymn "Lord, Enthroned in Heavenly Splendour" by George Hugh Bourne and the Welsh hymn "Laudamus". The tune is reputed to have been originally written by Owen on a piece of slate whilst on his way to work at the Dorothea quarry in Gwynedd, North Wales.

The melody was the basis for Channing Lefebvre's orchestral composition Measures on an Old Welsh Tune, written in Nova Scotia in 1946 and premiered in Concord on December 7, 1947 by the New Hampshire Symphony Orchestra.

== Bibliography ==
- The Hymnal 1982. The Church Pension Fund. 1985. ISBN 0-89869-120-6.
