= Mount Calvary Cemetery =

Mount Calvary Cemetery may refer to:

- Mount Calvary Cemetery (Davenport, Iowa)
- Mount Calvary Cemetery (Dubuque), Iowa, on the same street as St. John's Cemetery
- Mount Calvary Cemetery (Columbus, Ohio)
- Mount Calvary Cemetery (Portland, Oregon)

== See also ==
- Calvary Cemetery (disambiguation)
