= Pen-y-groes, Carmarthenshire =

Village in Carmarthenshire, Wales

Coordinates: 51.8003°N 4.0507°W

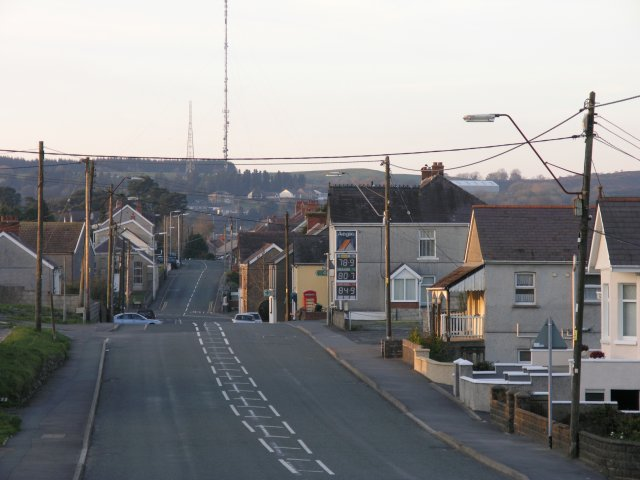
Pen-y-Groes village centre

Pen-y-groes is a village in Carmarthenshire, South Wales which developed as a settlement as a result of the anthracite coal trade. The main colliery was the Emlyn colliery, which opened in 1893 and closed in 1939.

Ysgol Gynradd Penygroes is the only school in the village. As of 2024, it has 167 pupils. The village is also home to a Rugby Union club, affiliated to the Welsh Rugby Union, a cricket team which plays in the Carmarthenshire League, and a football team that plays in the Carmarthenshire League.

It is named after Penygroes Independent Chapel, a large building at the centre of the village. There is also a Baptist chapel, Calfaria, founded in 1896.

The village was well known as the headquarters of the Apostolic Church. The denomination hosted their International Convention in the village every year from 1916 to 2002. The church moved its main office to Swansea in 2002 but they still have their Bible college and substantial land in the locality.

== Notable people ==
- David Eirwyn Morgan (1918–1982), a minister, journalist, Welsh nationalist politician and pacifist.
- Noah Anyadike (born 2011), footballer
