= Calvary Church of Santa Ana =

- Calvary Church of Santa Ana
- 33°45′15″N 117°50′09″W
- Location: Santa Ana, California
- Country: United States
- Denomination: Independent
- Website: Official Website

History
- Founded: 25 October 1931
- Founder: Charles E. Fuller

Architecture
- Construction cost: $9.7 million

Calvary Church of Santa Ana, located in Santa Ana, California, was founded on October 25, 1931. Overall, the church has had seven senior pastors. Eric Wakeling has been serving as the senior pastor since February, 2018.

== History ==
In 1931, Rev. Charles E. Fuller was the pastor at Calvary Church of Placentia. At the time of its founding, the church had 150 members. According to Pastor Michael Samsvick, who became pastor in 1961, Calvary was founded by Christians who wanted a church that would "stand for and teach the whole Bible as the Word of God.

The Church met in rented space at the Ebell Club in Downtown Santa Ana until moving into a renovated house in October 1942. Its first building on Tustin Avenue was dedicated in 1962. In 1967 the Church dedicated a new, 850-seat sanctuary at a cost of $350,000. In 1981 the Church had 1,000 members, by 1992 it had grown to 4,500 members under the leadership of pastor David Hocking, who left the church under a cloud of scandal.

Calvary dedicated a new 75,000-square-foot building costing $9.7 million in November 1992, the "largest worship center" in Orange County.
