= Kalwaria =

Kalwaria may refer to any of the Polish towns named after Calvary (the site of Jesus's crucifixion):

- Góra Kalwaria, sanctuary near Warsaw
- Kalwaria Pacławska, sanctuary near Przemyśl
- Kalwaria Zebrzydowska, sanctuary near Kraków
- Kalwaria, Pomeranian Voivodeship

== See also ==
- Kalvarija, Lithuania, called Kalwaria in Polish, and very close to the modern Polish border
- Kalvarija (disambiguation)
