= Kalvarija =

Kalvarija (that means, Calvary) may refer to:

- Kalvarija, Lithuania, a city
- Kalvarija Municipality, Lithuania
- Kalvarija (hill), a hill in Maribor, Slovenia
- Kalvarija (Zemun), a neighborhood in Belgrade, Serbia
- Žemaičių Kalvarija, a town in Lithuania
- Kalvarija (film), a film by Zvonimir Maycug

== See also ==
- Kalwaria (disambiguation)
