= National Register of Historic Places listings in Botetourt County, Virginia =

Location of Botetourt County in Virginia

Botetourt County, Virginia, United States, has 31 properties and districts listed on the National Register of Historic Places, including one National Historic Landmark. Another three properties were once listed but have been removed.

The locations of National Register properties and districts for which the latitude and longitude coordinates are included below may be seen in an online map.

This National Park Service list is complete through NPS recent listings posted August 28, 2026.

== Current listings ==
	Name on the Register	Image	Date listed	Location	City or town	Description
1	Anderson House	Anderson House	February 25, 1999 (#98000696)	5640 Lee Ln. 37°28′28″N 79°58′08″W	Haymakertown	
2	Annandale	Annandale	February 11, 1993 (#93000039)	Gilmore Mill Rd., 1.5 miles (2.4 km) east of its junction with Forest Oaks Rd. 37°35′44″N 79°34′46″W	Gilmore Mills	
3	Bessemer Archaeological Site (44 BO 26)	Bessemer Archaeological Site (44 BO 26)	December 15, 1984 (#84000807)	Confluence of the James River with Craig Creek; 37°39′05″N 79°48′44″W	Eagle Rock	
4	Blue Ridge Hall	Blue Ridge Hall	November 22, 2016 (#16000794)	11593 U.S. Route 11; 37°28′20″N 79°47′41″W	Fincastle	
10	Blue Ridge Parkway	Blue Ridge Parkway	December 13, 2024 (#100011353)	Blue Ridge Parkway through Virginia and North Carolina; 38°01′51″N 78°51′28″W	Laymantown vicinity	
5	Bowyer-Holladay House	Bowyer-Holladay House	June 10, 1999 (#99000704)	U.S. Route 220; 37°26′19″N 79°54′23″W	Fincastle	
6	Breckinridge Mill	Breckinridge Mill	July 30, 1980 (#80004172)	West of Fincastle on Breckinridge Mill Rd.; also 7850 Breckinridge Mill Rd. 37°30′00″N 79°54′38″W	Fincastle	7850 Breckinridge Mill represents a boundary increase of May 30, 2002
7	Buchanan Historic District	Buchanan Historic District	January 27, 1999 (#99000070)	Roughly along Main St., from 19th St. to its intersection with U.S. Route 81; 37°31′43″N 79°40′48″W	Buchanan	
8	Buchanan Theatre	Buchanan Theatre	April 15, 2019 (#100003611)	19778 Main St. 37°31′41″N 79°40′46″W	Buchanan	
9	Callie Furnace	Callie Furnace	January 21, 1974 (#74002108)	1.5 miles (2.4 km) north of Glen Wilton in the George Washington National Forest; 37°46′37″N 79°49′27″W	Glen Wilton	
10	Fincastle Historic District	Fincastle Historic District	November 12, 1969 (#69000224)	Roughly bounded by Carper, Hancock, Catawba, and Back Sts., and Griffin Alley; 37°29′55″N 79°52′34″W	Fincastle	
11	Gala Site	Gala Site	March 17, 2010 (#10000088)	Eastern bank of the James River between Mill and Sinking Creeks; 37°41′22″N 79°48′40″W	Gala	
12	Glencoe		February 19, 2021 (#100006157)	1088 Poor Farm Rd. 37°31′00″N 79°51′27″W	Fincastle vicinity	
13	Greenfield Kitchen and Quarters		April 1, 2022 (#100007570)	International Pkwy. and US 220; 37°26′16″N 79°54′13″W	Daleville vicinity	
14	Greyledge	Greyledge	February 5, 2002 (#01001571)	1066 Greyledge Rd. 37°34′22″N 79°40′00″W	Buchanan	
15	Hawthorne Hall	Hawthorne Hall	January 28, 2000 (#00000025)	1527 Hawthorne Hall Rd. 37°31′30″N 79°53′30″W	Fincastle	
16	Thomas D. Kinzie House	Thomas D. Kinzie House	April 26, 2002 (#02000445)	65 Kinzie Rd. 37°23′45″N 79°53′54″W	Troutville	
17	Lauderdale	Lauderdale	October 31, 2007 (#07001132)	13508 U.S. Route 11; 37°29′20″N 79°46′38″W	Buchanan	
18	Looney Mill Creek Site	Looney Mill Creek Site	August 3, 1978 (#78003007)	Southern side of the James River immediately west of the Looney Mill Creek confluence 37°31′08″N 79°42′14″W	Buchanan	
19	Bryan McDonald Jr. House	Bryan McDonald Jr. House	August 24, 2011 (#11000604)	4084 Catawba Rd. 37°26′49″N 79°57′54″W	Troutville	
20	Nininger's Mill	Nininger's Mill	July 30, 1980 (#80004171)	South of Daleville; 37°24′06″N 79°55′06″W	Daleville	
21	Phoenix Bridge	Phoenix Bridge	June 10, 1975 (#75002015)	Northwest of Eagle Rock off Craig Creek Rd. over Craig Creek; 37°38′57″N 79°49′52″W	Eagle Rock	
22	Prospect Hill	Prospect Hill	December 28, 1979 (#79003031)	Off Church St. 37°29′31″N 79°52′20″W	Fincastle	
23	George Washington Rader House	George Washington Rader House	August 25, 2014 (#14000525)	8910 U.S. Route 11; 37°27′08″N 79°49′52″W	Fincastle	
24	Reynolds Property	Reynolds Property	November 22, 2016 (#16000795)	514 Rocky Rd. 37°35′21″N 79°36′58″W	Buchanan	
25	Roaring Run Furnace	Roaring Run Furnace	March 21, 1983 (#83003263)	Northwest of Eagle Rock on Roaring Run Rd. 37°42′29″N 79°53′34″W	Eagle Rock	
26	Santillane	Santillane	July 24, 1974 (#74002107)	West of U.S. Route 220; 37°29′36″N 79°52′53″W	Fincastle	
27	Varney's Falls Dam	Varney's Falls Dam	October 14, 1993 (#93001127)	On the James River, southeast of the junction of Gilmore Mill and Forest Oaks Rds. 37°34′49″N 79°35′49″W	Gilmore Mills	
28	Wheatland Manor	Wheatland Manor	February 5, 1992 (#91002040)	Northern side of Wheatland Rd., 0.25 miles (0.40 km) southeast of its junction with Pine Haven Rd. 37°30′16″N 79°48′21″W	Fincastle	
29	Wiloma	Wiloma	November 22, 1985 (#85002913)	Off U.S. Route 220; 37°30′57″N 79°53′22″W	Fincastle	
30	Wilson Warehouse	Wilson Warehouse	January 26, 1978 (#78003008)	Lower and Washington Sts. 37°31′38″N 79°40′56″W	Buchanan	

== Former listings ==
	Name on the Register	Image	Date listed	Date removed	Location	City or town	Description
1	Botetourt County Courthouse		July 2, 1971 (#71001063)	May 30, 1975	Corner of Main and Roanoke Sts.	Fincastle	Added to National Register after it was destroyed by fire in December 1970
2	Greenfield	Greenfield	June 28, 2011 (#10000792)	January 6, 2022	Botetourt Center at Greenfield, U.S. Route 220; 37°26′09″N 79°55′04″W	Fincastle	
3	Springwood Truss Bridge		April 15, 1978 (#78003009)	March 19, 2001	VA 630 over James River	Springwood	Destroyed by flood in 1985

== See also ==
- List of National Historic Landmarks in Virginia
- National Register of Historic Places listings in Virginia
