= Robert Bennett Bean =

American anatomist and ethnologist (1874–1944)

Robert Bennett Bean (March 24, 1874 in Gala, Virginia –1944) was an associate professor of anatomy and ethnologist adept to craniometry and the concept of "race", whose scientific work was discredited by his mentor but who nonetheless became a professor at the University of Virginia and remained so until his death.

== Life and career ==
Bean, through his mother, was descended from the First Families of Virginia, including colonist and land owner William Randolph. He studied medicine and anatomy and obtained a B.S. in medicine, followed by an M.D. in anatomy in 1904.

== Career ==
Bean became a professor of anatomy at numerous universities, including the University of Michigan (1905–1907), the Philippine Medical School of Manila (1908) and the Tulane University of Louisiana (1910–1916). In 1916 he accepted a position as an associate professor at the University of Virginia and remained so until his death. He became the councilor of the American Anthropological Association in 1919 and was also a regional chairman for the American Association for the Advancement of Science (1926).

== Works ==
He is best remembered for his ethnological work The Races of Man (1932).

== Books ==
- Racial Anatomy of the Philippine Islanders (1910)
- The Races of Man. Differentiation and Dispersal of Man (1932, 2nd Ed. 1935)
- The Peopling of Virginia (1938)
