= Reynolds Property =

Historic district in Virginia, United States

- U.S. National Register of Historic Places
- U.S. Historic district
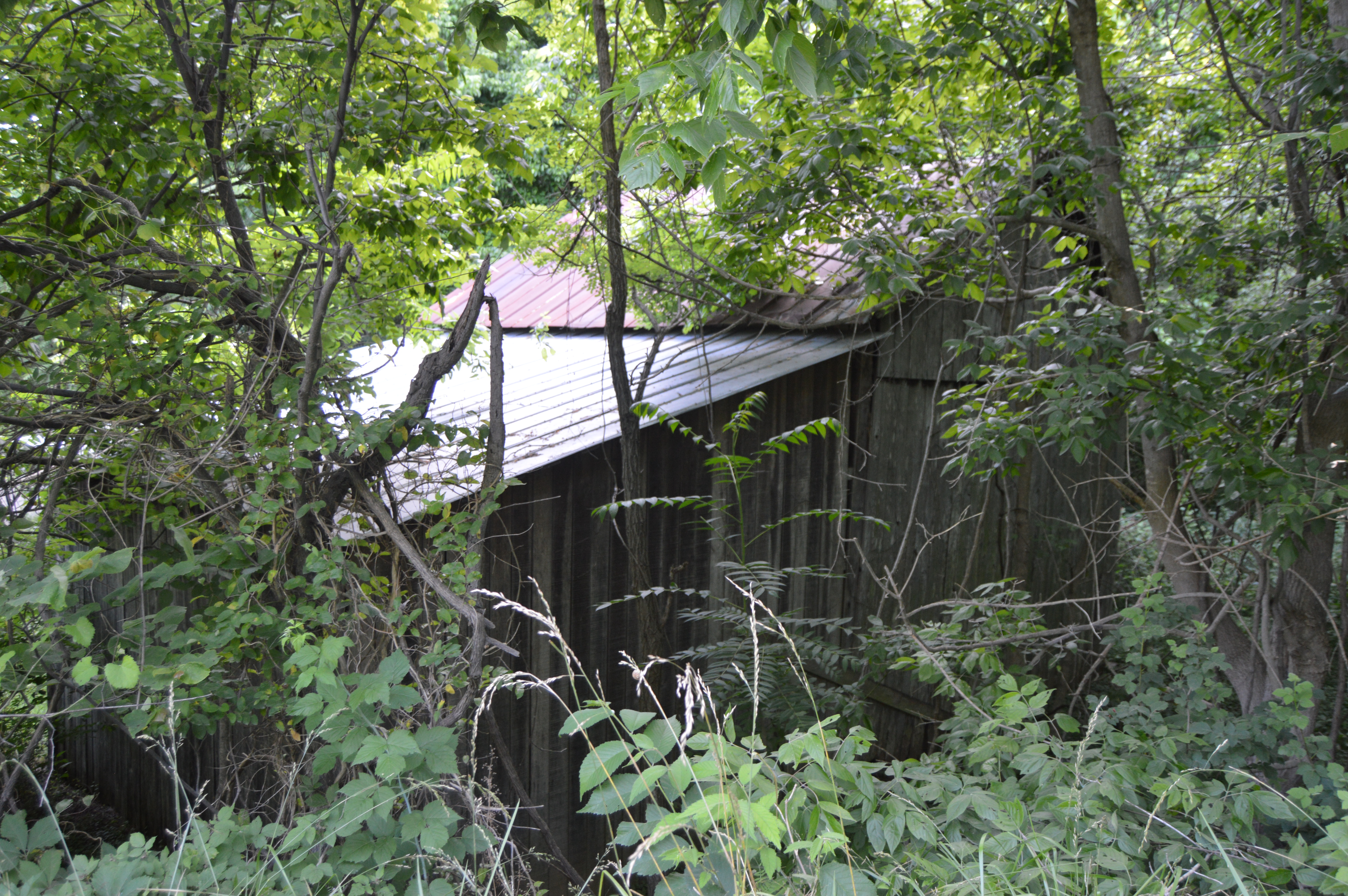
- An outbuilding on the property

- Location within Virginia Location within the United States
- Location: 514 Rocky Rd., northeast of Buchanan, Virginia
- Coordinates: 37°35′21″N 79°36′58″W
- Area: 150 acres (61 ha)
- Built: late 18th or early 19th century
- NRHP reference No.: 16000795
- Added to NRHP: November 22, 2016

The Reynolds Property is a historic country property at 514 Rocky Road in rural northeastern Botetourt County, Virginia. It consists of 150 acres (61 ha) that are now mainly woodlands, with prominent limestone outcrops, and is located opposite an active limestone quarry. The main house is a single-story stone structure, built about 1800, possibly by Thomas Newell. The property is notable for its mid-19th century ownership by Greenville B.W. Reynolds, who owned a lime works of which only ruined remnants survive.

The property was listed on the National Register of Historic Places in 2016.

== See also ==
- National Register of Historic Places listings in Botetourt County, Virginia
