= Blue Ridge Mall =

Blue Ridge Mall may refer to:

- Blue Ridge Mall (North Carolina), a mall in Hendersonville, North Carolina
- Blue Ridge Crossing, formerly Blue Ridge Mall, in Kansas City, Missouri

== See also ==
- Blue Ridge Hall
