= Pleasant Richardson =

Pleasant Richardson (c. 1845- May 30, 1935) was a resident of Fincastle in Botetourt County, Virginia, where he was a former slave, a property owner, and Civil War veteran.

== Early life ==
Pleasant Richardson was born to his slave parents, Patrick and Martha Richardson, on the nearby Edward Johnson family plantation, Lauderdale, in about 1845. His name is not listed on the 1850 census of Botetourt County. However, an inventory of the plantation was taken in 1853 when Edward Johnson died, and listed the 50 slaves present on the farm. Pleasant was the third youngest in the family. The siblings included Will, Louis, Maria, Adaline, Taylor and Joe.

== Civil War ==
During the third year of the Civil War, he fled the plantation and crossed the border to Grafton, West Virginia, in 1864. There at age 19, he enlisted in Company F of the 45th United States Colored Infantry Regiment. This was the single black regiment assigned to West Virginia, and was composed mostly of escaped slaves and some freedmen from Pennsylvania, Virginia and West Virginia.

"He served with the 45th Infantry of the U.S. Colored Troops, a posting that took him to West Virginia and Pennsylvania, then Washington, D.C., and in the spring of 1864, he was one of 30,000 Union soldiers who undertook the ill-fated Red River Campaign across Louisiana. Roughly one in five men on the Union side died during that expedition, but Richardson survived and the following year he was present when Gen. Robert E. Lee surrendered at Appomattox Court House, according to a 1935 article in the Fincastle Herald."

== Civilian life ==
After he was discharged in Philadelphia, Private Richardson returned to Botetourt County. There he married Henriette Braxton, and they had two children, of which only Mrs. Arena Richardson Preston survived him. After the death of his first wife, he married Mrs. Nancy Callender, who also predeceased him.

Although he was unskilled and possibly unlettered, he was able to accumulate some property in the county after his return. He acquired Lot #151 on Murray Street by his marriage to Nancy Callender Richardson, which he subsequently sold to Mary L. Dodd in 1924. He also purchased one lot, #176 on Water Street, from E. Kate Crowder in 1912, which he later sold to Mr. William Gilliam in 1915. The lot numbers are taken from Gray's New Map of Fincastle from 1880.

== Death and burial ==
Private Richardson always remained proud of his service record, and appropriately enough, he died on Memorial Day in 1935. He was buried in Fincastle. "He was a consistent member of First Baptist Church of Fincastle, Virginia. He was a soldier par excellence and next to his religion prided in this fact. It was very appropriate that he answered his last bugle call on Memorial Day."

On May 17, 2017, the local Sons of Union Veterans of the Civil War decorated his grave for Memorial Day.

Private Pleasant Richardson was posthumously awarded the West Virginia Civil War Medal for his service with the 45th US Colored Infantry. The medal has been placed on display at the Botetourt County Museum of History.
