= Gala Site =

Archaeological site in Virginia, United States

- U.S. National Register of Historic Places
- Virginia Landmarks Register
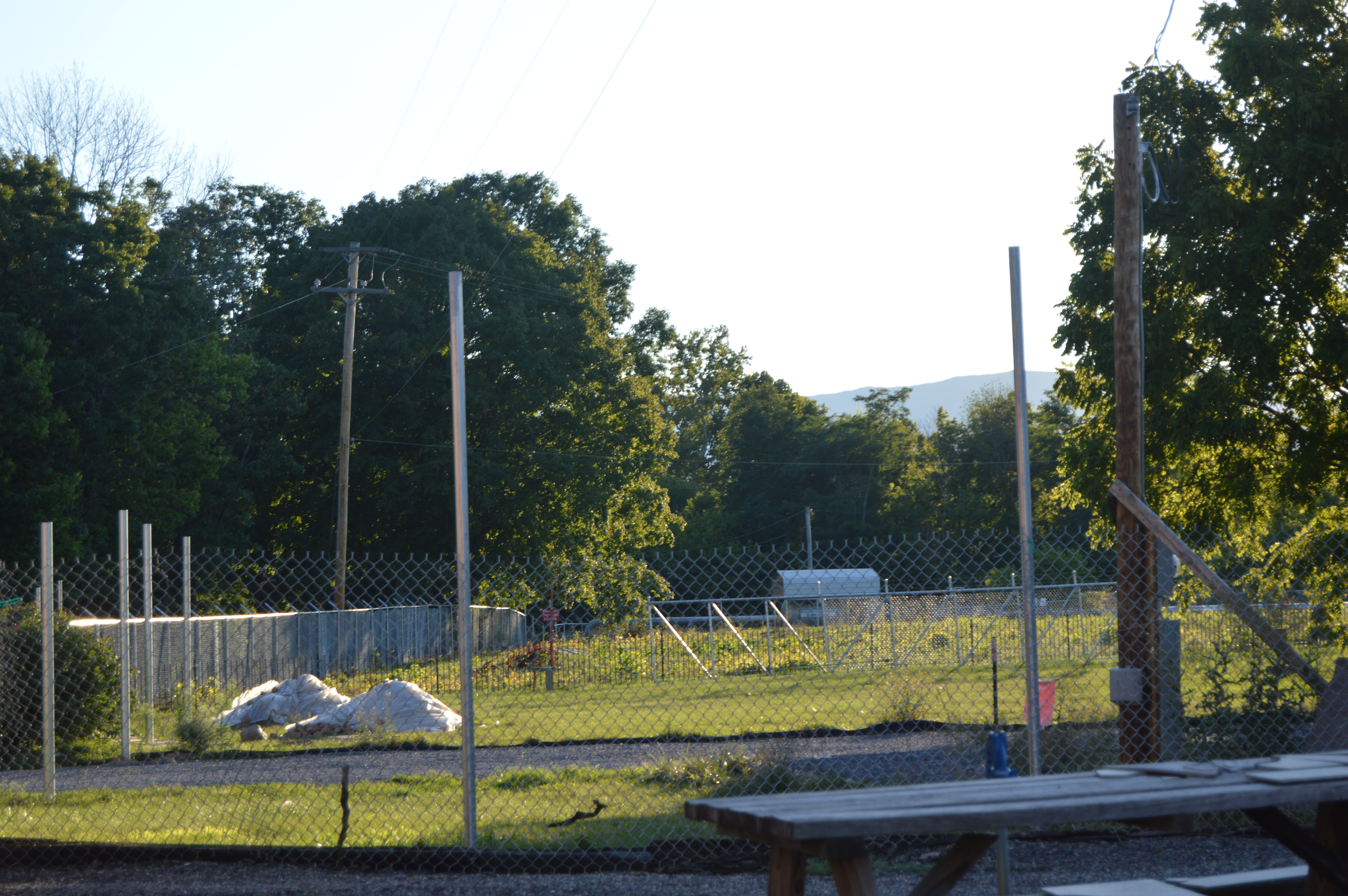
- Overview from U.S. Route 220 to the east
- Location: Address Restricted, Gala, Virginia
- Area: 18 acres (7.3 ha)
- NRHP reference No.: 10000088
- VLR No.: 011-5155

Significant dates
- Added to NRHP: March 17, 2010
- Designated VLR: December 17, 2009

Gala Site is a historic archaeological site located near Gala, Botetourt County, Virginia. The site was occupied by Native Americans from circa 3000-1000 B.C. to ca. 900–1607. Archaeological resources at the site include intact remains ranging in function from mortuary to architectural to subsistence as well as community refuse. The site has the potential to provide scholars invaluable information about Native American funerary practices, settlement patterns, ethnic diversity, and other information about the people who inhabited the upper James River portion of southwestern Virginia.

It was listed on the National Register of Historic Places in 2010.
