= James River bateau =

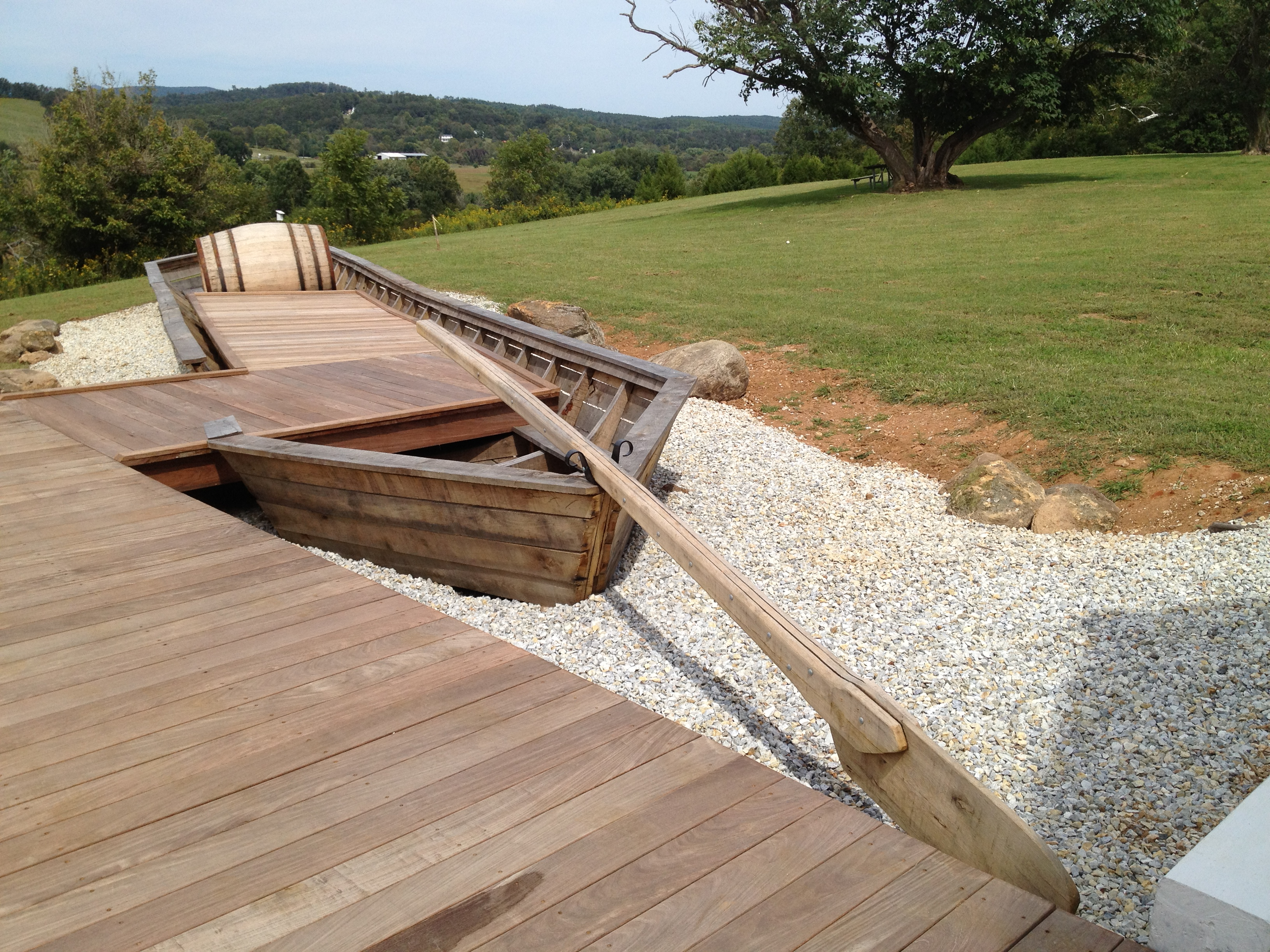
Batteaux [sic] replica at James River State Park, Virginia

The James River bateau was a shallow draft river craft used during the period from 1775 to 1840 to transport tobacco and other cargo on the James River and its tributaries in the Commonwealth of Virginia. It was flat bottomed and pointed at both ends. The length of the bateau varied greatly, 58 feet (18 m) being a common length. The bateau was propelled by bateaumen pushing with long sturdy poles. Alternate spellings of bateau include batteau, batoe, and the plurals bateaux, batoes, and batteaux. Bateau is the French word for boat. In the colonial days, bateaux were used extensively in rivers throughout the eastern part of the United States, but the coverage of this article is confined to those that plied the James River in the Commonwealth of Virginia.

== Origin ==
Anthony and Benjamin Rucker were the original inventors and constructors of the James River bateau in 1775. It was a boat essentially different from any before that time used on the rivers of Virginia. The Ruckers' design was successfully patented many years after its development. The earliest known reference to the bateau comes from Thomas Jefferson's account book, dated April 19, 1775. Jefferson had been present at the first launching, and forty-six years later he was witness to the successful patenting of the bateau by heirs of the Ruckers. George Washington also mentioned the bateau in his diary entry, dated April 7, 1791. Unfortunately, none of the original bateaux exist. Some remains were uncovered by construction workers at the site of the James River and Kanawha Canal Basin.

== Tobacco hauling ==
The five Rucker brothers were among the tobacco planters in Amherst County, Virginia. Anthony Rucker was a tobacco inspector for the county. The need to transport large hogshead of tobacco to the port at Richmond, Virginia, likely motivated the Rucker brothers to develop the bateau. It was just wide enough to accommodate standard hogsheads (barrels) across the floor. The tobacco hogshead became standardized by the 1760s and measured 48 inches (120 cm) long and 30 inches (76 cm) in diameter at the head. They held about 1,000 pounds (450 kg) of tightly packed tobacco. Larger bateaux could transport 10 or more hogsheads, depending on river conditions. Tobacco was a very profitable crop, and because of cheap slave labor vast amounts were produced by planters along the James River basin.

== Upper James River transportation ==
The bateau became such a useful craft that it was also used for other cargo as well as passenger transportation. During the period of 1820 to 1840, at least 500 bateaux and 1,500 bateaumen operated on the James River between Lynchburg, Virginia and Richmond. Boatmen were nearly all Slave and Free African Americans. The use of the bateau sharply declined after 1840 when the James and Kanawha River Canal reached Lynchburg. The packet boat and rail took over the cargo.

== Construction details ==
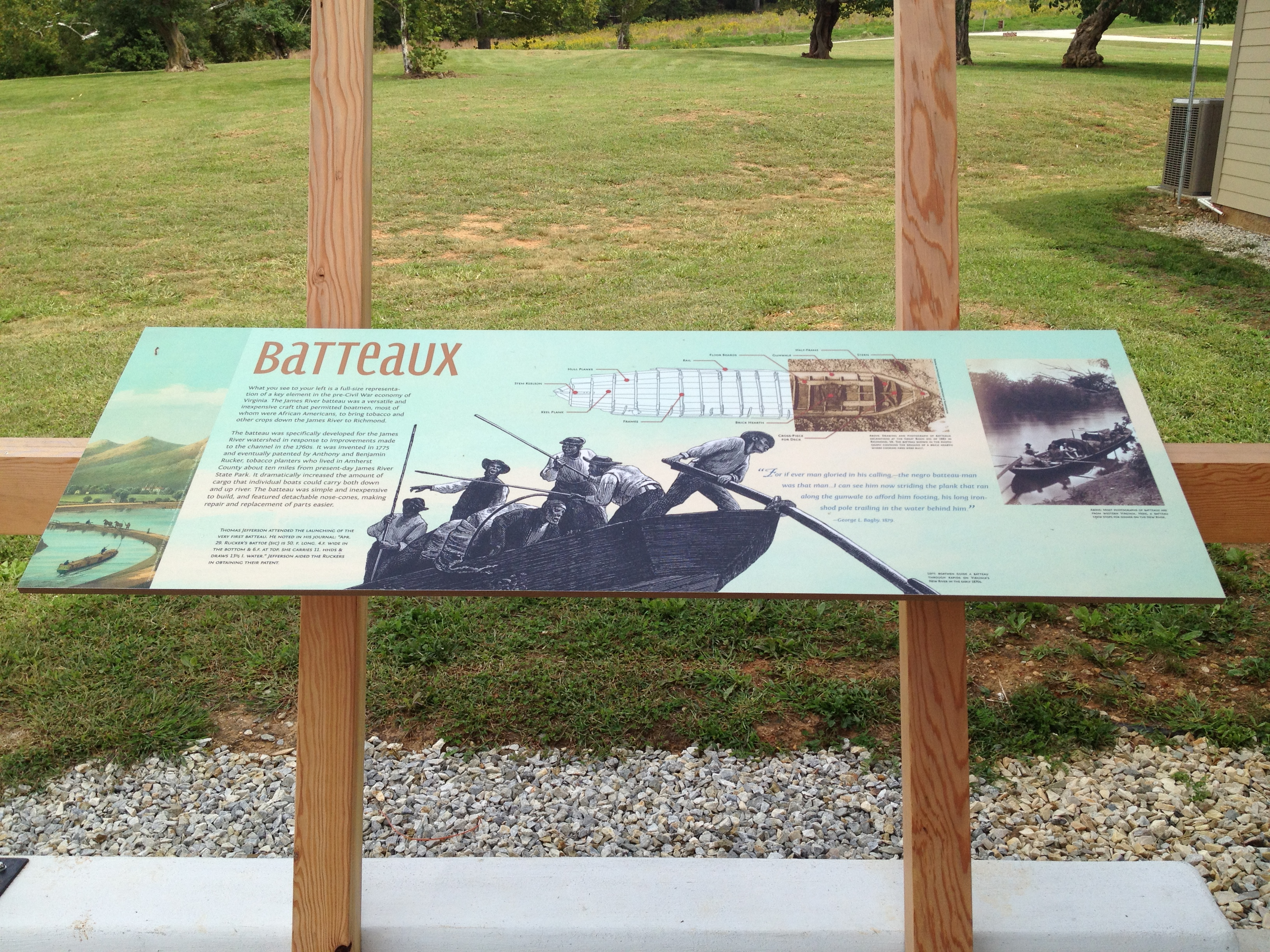
James River State Park

The James River bateau was designed for freight and for ease of navigation in the shallow rocky waters of the Upper James. Thomas Jefferson, in 1775, recorded the purchase of a bateau in his account book, stating, "Apr. 29. Rucker's battoe (sic) is 50. f. long. 4.f. wide in the bottom & 6.f. at top. she carries 11. hhds & draws 13½ I. water." Typical bateaus were thought to be about 58 feet (18 m) long, some shorter, some longer. They had no keel to interfere with navigating river rapids and were well adapted to shallow water, having a draft of about 12–18 inches (30–46 centimetres) when loaded. They measured 6–8 feet (1.8–2.4 m) at the beam. The sides varied from 18–24 inches (46–61 centimetres) in height. Very long planks, fastened to ribs, formed the sides and bottom. The nose cones were built and attached separately to facilitate maintenance since the ends of the bateau received abuse from the river rocks. The bateau had no rudder and was guided by long sweeps that engaged notches formed in the tip of the nose cones. The cargo versions had no seats. Passenger versions had a canopy and some had oar locks.

== James River Batteau Festival ==
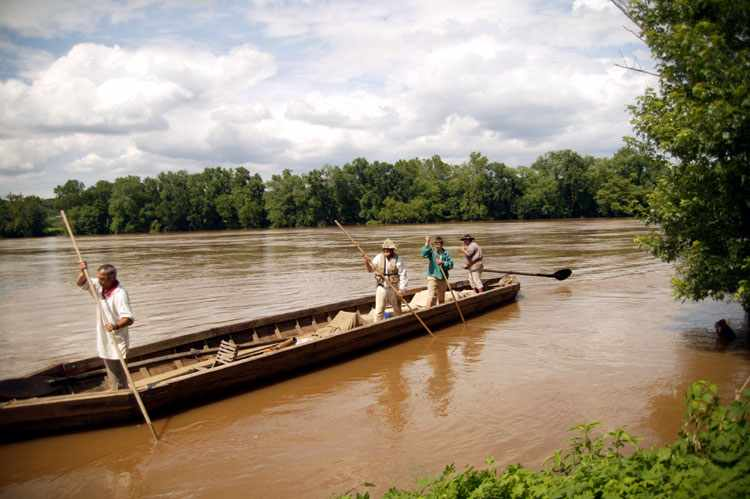
Reenactment of bateau usage

Even though the working bateau is no longer used, historians and river enthusiasts still keep the memory alive. Replicas of the bateaus have been built around the country and bateau river cruises are available in a number of states. Since 1985, the James River Batteau Festival has promoted a bateau run from Lynch's Landing in Lynchburg to Maiden's Landing in Powhatan, a distance of about 120 river miles (200 km). Seventeen bateaux crews and many canoeists participated in the 2005 festival. The number of bateaux on the river during the festival has increased to 25 in 2009.

== See also ==
- Flat-bottomed boat
  - Barge
- Shallop
- Tobacco
