= Looney Mill Creek Site =

Archaeological site in Virginia, United States

- U.S. National Register of Historic Places
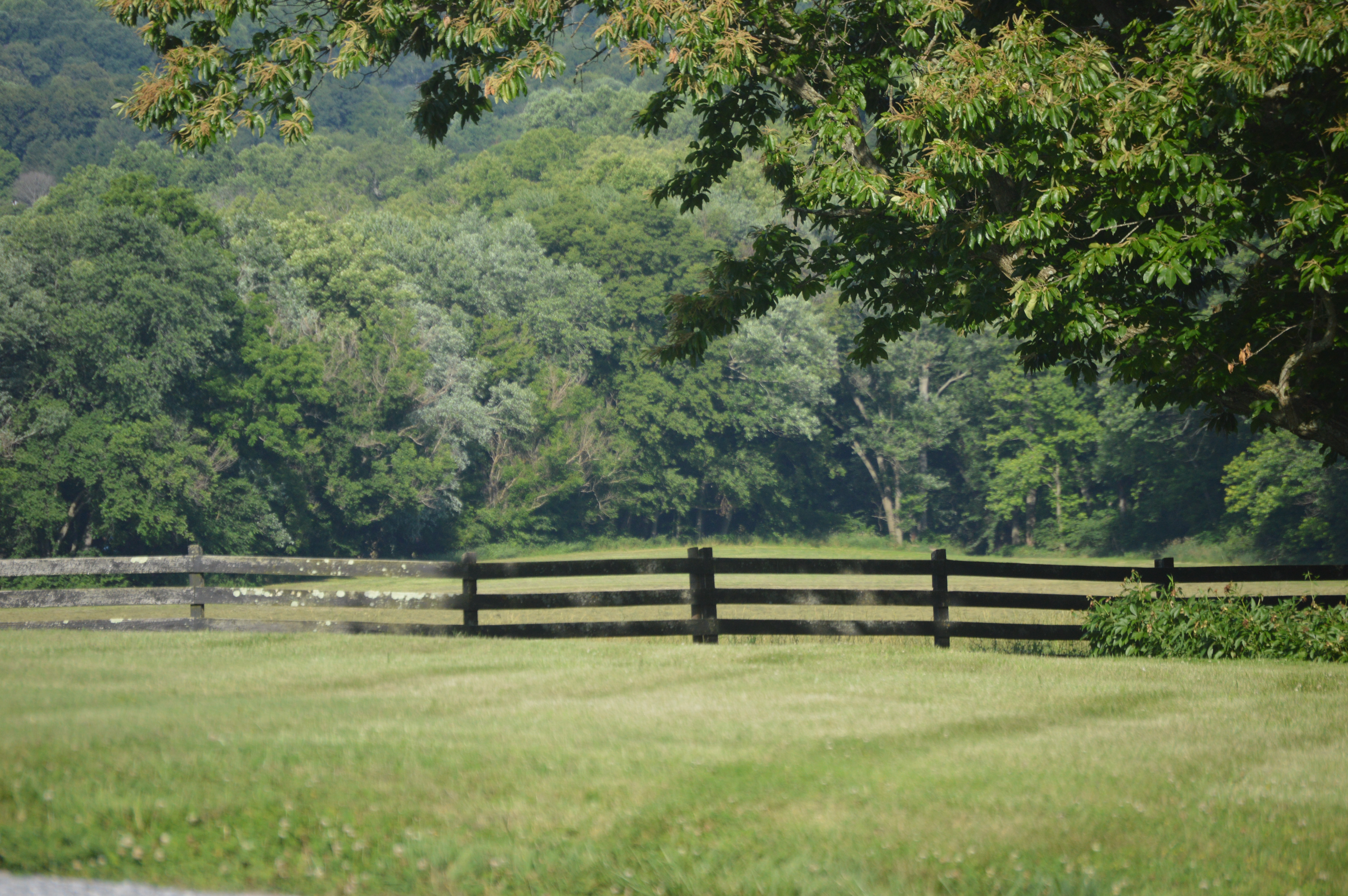
- Distant view from the west
- Nearest city: Buchanan, Virginia
- Area: 1.5 acres (0.61 ha)
- Built: 1742
- NRHP reference No.: 78003007
- Added to NRHP: August 3, 1978

The Looney Mill Creek Site is a prehistoric and historic archaeological site near Buchanan in Botetourt County, Virginia. The site, located near the confluence of Looney's Mill Creek and the James River, has evidence of Native American occupation dating as far back as 6000BC, and was the site of the settlement and mill established c. 1742 by Robert Looney, one of the area's first European settlers.

The site was listed on the National Register of Historic Places in 1978.

== See also ==
- National Register of Historic Places listings in Botetourt County, Virginia
