= First Baptist Church of Fincastle, Virginia =

Coordinates: 37.497717°N 79.871487°W

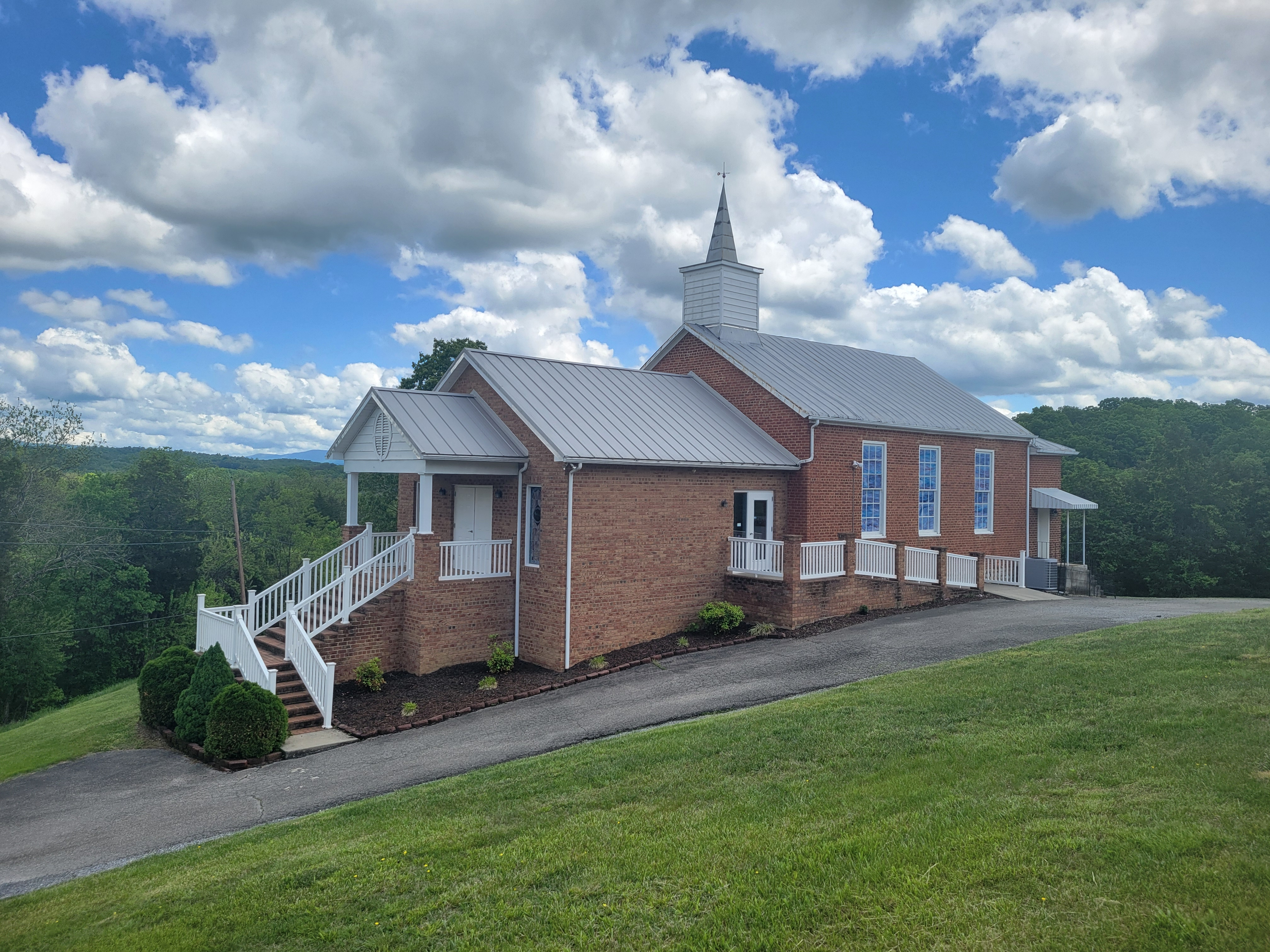
First Baptist Church of Fincastle

The First Baptist Church of Fincastle, Virginia was started in October 1831 by slaves in Fincastle, Virginia, United States.

== History ==
=== Church origins ===
During this period, slaves were only able to meet for religious services, and often only under the eyes of a white observer. "Father Dempsey gathered three blacks, one of whom was a slave, and allowed them to sit in the local all-white church's balcony. In accordance with the laws of the time, they could listen to the service, but they could not fully participate. Black membership quickly grew, and on July 22, 1848 Benjamin Ammen suggested that an African Church be formulated in Fincastle. The Fincastle African Church was admitted under the watchful care of the white church in the Valley Baptist Association on June 23, 1849, and in 1866, the watch care was discontinued.

=== Civil War and after ===
After the Civil War ended, the following freemen acted as trustees for the new African Baptist Church: Rev. John "Jack" Jones; William F. Bannister; Edmund Gilliam; Jefferson Gilmore; Samuel Pogue; Anderson Miller and John Foster. "In 1866, freedmen purchased for $50.00 cash in hand, a parcel of land from John and Lucy Linkenaugher."

The first church framed building was destroyed by fire, and under the direction of Rev. Jack Jones' leadership, the present church building was built. With the assistance of the Freedmen Bureau of Philadelphia, the First African Church of Fincastle was built by the freed slaves. The bricks were handmade, and the walls are between 8-11 inches thick. In addition to the services of the Captain Charles S. Schaffer, a Baptist missionary from the north, and donations given by the nearly penniless ex-slaves, the church construction began. The Botetourt School Board helped build the church foundation with the stipulation the basement would be used for 20 years as a school for the black children of the town.

The African-American Baptist Church of Fincastle was named the First Baptist Church, and was part of the Valley Colored Association, first formed by Elder Jack Jones.

=== Twentieth century ===
As the black community began to disperse following World War II, six new churches from the Fincastle Baptist Church sprang up in Botetourt County, Virginia: Lapsley's Run Baptist Church, Springwood Baptist Church, Amsterdam Baptist Church, Gravel Hill Baptist Church, Hardy, Virginia, Midway Baptist Church and Lily of the Valley Baptist Church.

In 1980 the church choir participated in a video cassette production of a history of African American music.

In 2017, the grave of Private Pleasant Richardson was decorated by the Sons of Union Veterans of the Civil War in a Memorial Day observance. "He was a consistent member of the First Baptist Church of Fincastle, Virginia. He was a soldier par excellence and next to his religion prided in this fact. It was very appropriate that he answered his last bugle call on Memorial Day."
