= Bessemer Archaeological Site =

Archaeological site in Virginia, United States

- Bessemer Archaeological Site (44 BO 26)
- U.S. National Register of Historic Places
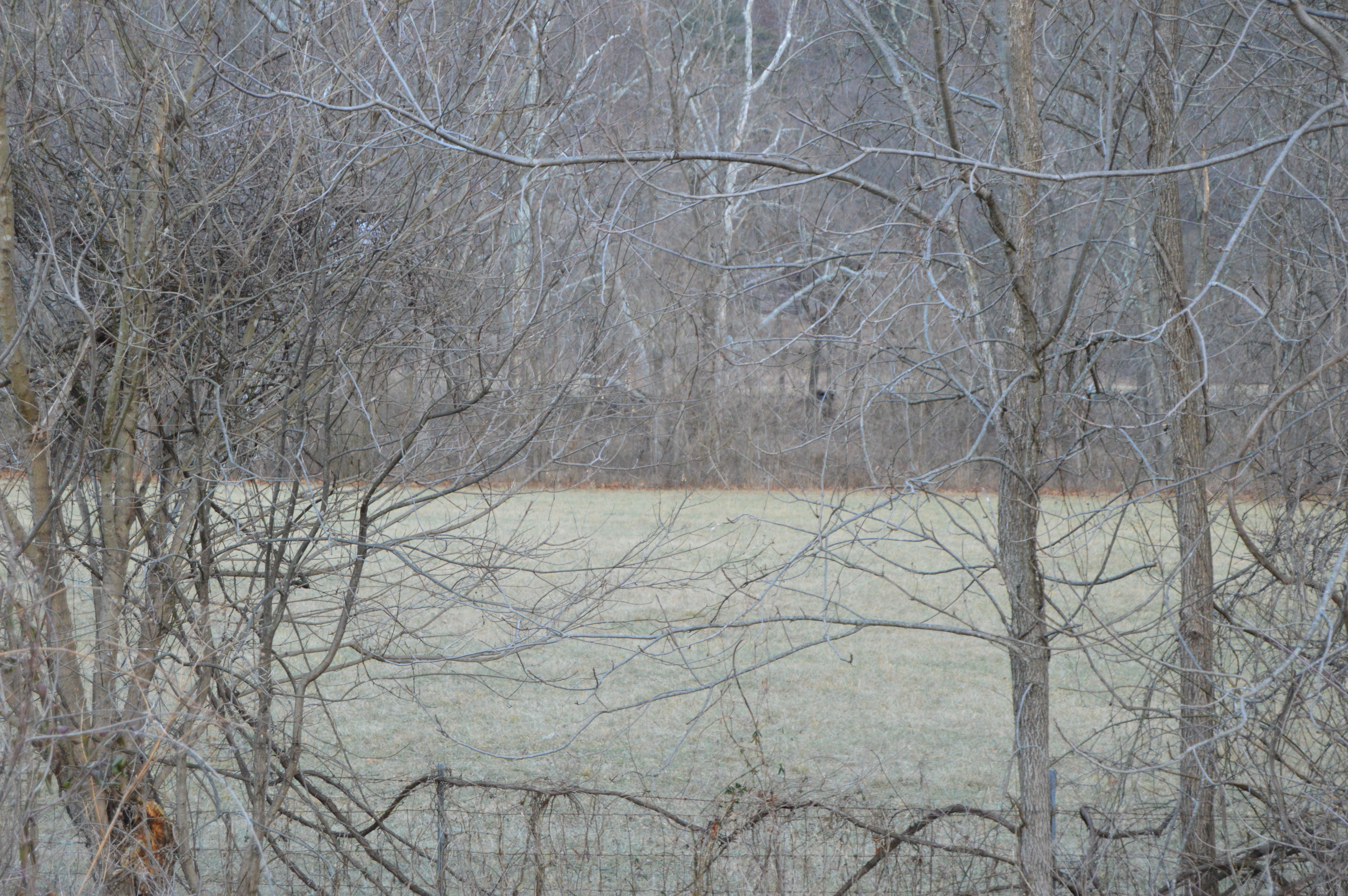
- Overview from U.S. Route 220
- Nearest city: Eagle Rock, Virginia
- Area: 3.8 acres (1.5 ha)
- NRHP reference No.: 84000807
- Added to NRHP: December 15, 1984

The Bessemer Archaeological Site is a prehistoric Native American site in Botetourt County, Virginia. The site was first excavated in 1977 prior to the construction of Virginia Route 220 through the area, and again in 1987 when the roadway was widened. It included pit hearths, evidence of a large (20 meter by 6 meter) rectangular building, stone tools, and pottery sherds. Human burial sites were also identified, as was the location of portions of a palisade that probably surrounded the settlement.

The site was listed on the National Register of Historic Places in 1984.

== See also ==
- National Register of Historic Places listings in Botetourt County, Virginia
