= George Washington Rader House =

Historic house in Virginia, US

- U.S. National Register of Historic Places
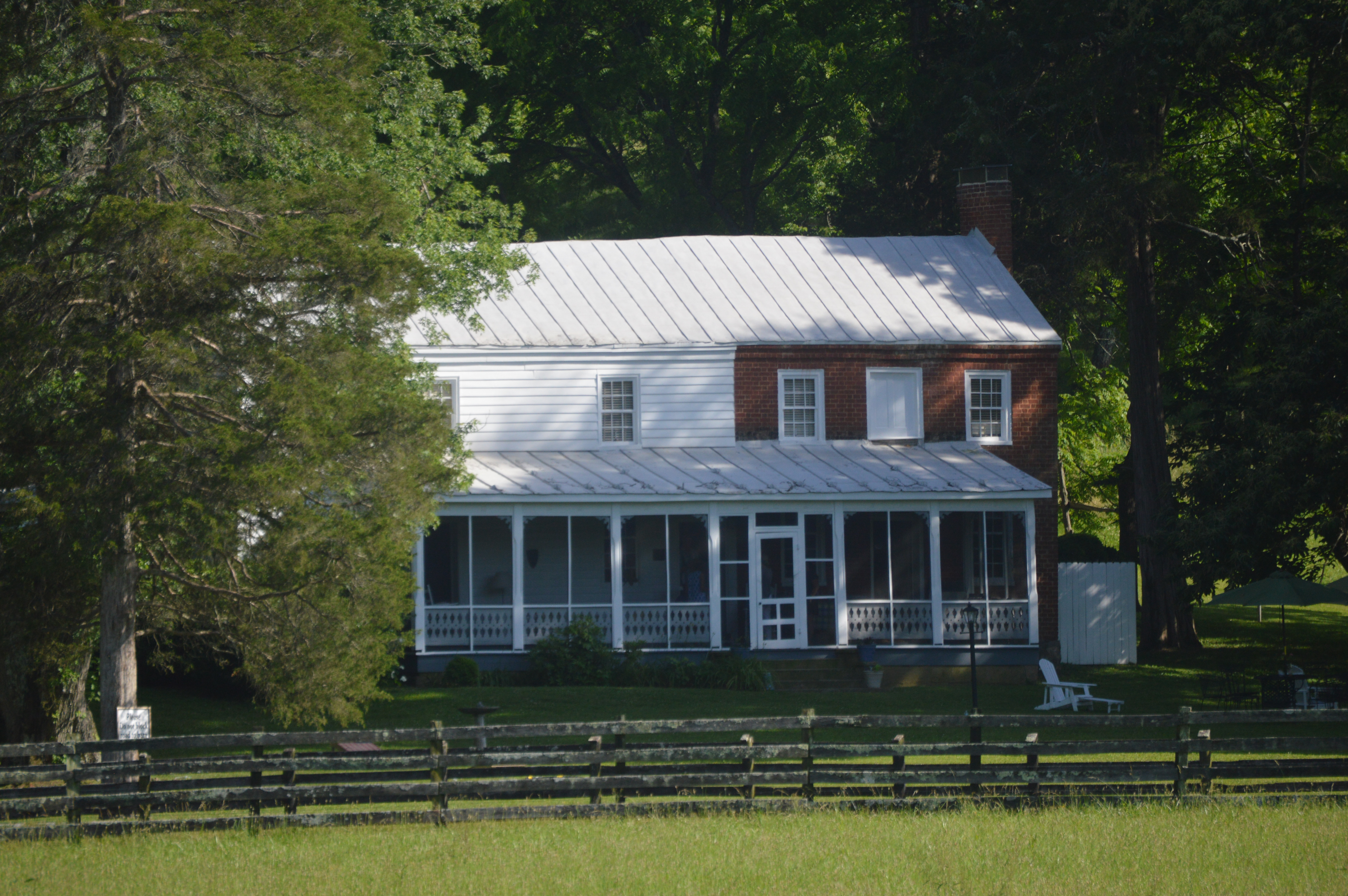
- Front of the house

- Location within Virginia Location within the United States
- Location: 8910 U.S. Route 11, southeast of Fincastle, Virginia
- Coordinates: 37°27′8″N 79°49′48.5″W
- Built: c. 1820
- NRHP reference No.: 14000525
- Added to NRHP: August 25, 2014

The George Washington Rader House is a historic house at 8910 Lee Highway (United States Route 11) near Fincastle, Virginia. With its oldest portion dating to c. 1820, this house exemplifies the adaptation of old structures over time. The oldest portion is a log structure of two stories, which was nearly tripled in size by the construction of a brick addition about ten years later. In the early 20th century a single-story wood-frame addition was added to provide modern kitchen and bath facilities. The property includes a variety of farm-related outbuildings.

The house was listed on the National Register of Historic Places in 2014.

== See also ==
- National Register of Historic Places listings in Botetourt County, Virginia
