= Buchanan Theatre =

Historic theater in Buchanan, Virginia, US

- U.S. National Register of Historic Places
- Virginia Landmarks Register
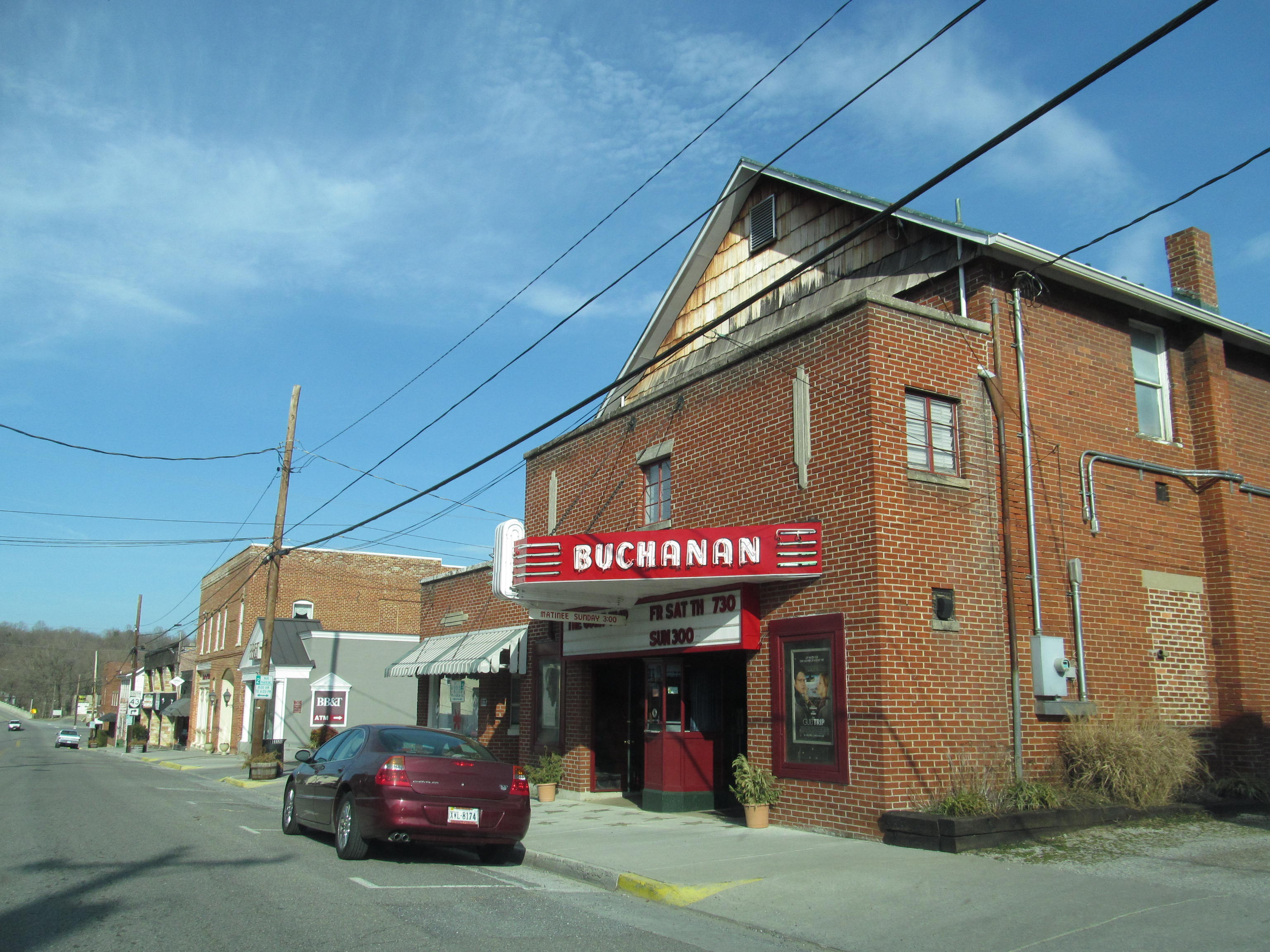
- Buchanan Theatre

- Location within Virginia Location within the United States
- Location: 19778 Main Street, Buchanan, Virginia
- Coordinates: 37°31′41″N 79°40′46″W
- Area: less than one acre
- Built: 1917
- Architect: Shank family
- Architectural style: Moderne
- NRHP reference No.: 100003611
- VLR No.: 180-0028-0117

Significant dates
- Added to NRHP: April 15, 2019
- Designated VLR: December 13, 2018

The Buchanan Theatre is a historic theater in Buchanan, Virginia. It was built in 1917 and underwent a 1949 renovation in the Moderne style. The brick building is two-storied, with apartments occupying the second floor. The theater closed in 1985 and sat empty until being purchased in 1999 and renovated over the next 18 months. It reopened as a movie house and community theater in 2002.

== History ==
The theater was built in 1917 and opened as the Star Theatre; its name changed to the Buchanan Theatre in 1931. The business was purchased in 1946 by Jack and Homer Jackson, and three years later the brothers remodeled the theater in the Moderne style with elements of Art Deco. The theater's triangular neon marquee dates to this remodel, as do a pair of cast concrete plaques on the façade. The interior includes a knotty-pine paneled lobby and a concession stand in the Streamline style. The auditorium seats roughly 200 in Moderne-style chairs.

The Buchanan closed in the aftermath of the 1985 Election Day floods. It remained empty until 1999 when it was purchased by Dale and Gloria Carter, who spent the next 18 months renovating the building. The theater reopened on November 1, 2002, with a showing of The Majestic starring Jim Carrey. (Note: The NRHP nomination form has the theatre reopening in 2001, but multiple other sources confirm 2002 to be the actual year.) A DVD projection system was used until its replacement with a digital projector in 2012.

The theater was listed on the National Register of Historic Places in 2019. It is also a contributing structure to the Buchanan Historic District.
