= Daleville, Virginia =

- Census-designated place
- Location within the Commonwealth of Virginia Daleville, Virginia (the United States)
- Coordinates: 37°25′2″N 79°55′10″W
- Country: United States
- State: Virginia
- County: Botetourt

Area
  - Total: 2.5 sq mi (6.5 km^{2})
  - Land: 2.5 sq mi (6.4 km^{2})
  - Water: 0.039 sq mi (0.1 km^{2})
- Elevation: 1,299 ft (396 m)

Population (2020)
  - Total: 3,070
  - Density: 1,200/sq mi (480/km^{2})
- Time zone: UTC−5 (Eastern (EST))
  - Summer (DST): UTC−4 (EDT)
- ZIP Code: 24083 (Daleville); 24175 (Troutville)
- Area codes: 540 and 826
- FIPS code: 51-21152
- GNIS feature ID: 1492835

Daleville is a census-designated place (CDP) in southern Botetourt County, Virginia, United States. The population was 3,070 at the 2020 census. The CDP is located along U.S. Route 220. It is part of the Roanoke metropolitan area.

== History ==
Nininger's Mill was listed on the National Register of Historic Places in 1980.

== Geography ==
Daleville is located at 37°25′2″N 79°55′10″W (37.417146, −79.919528).

According to the United States Census Bureau, the CDP has a total area of 2.5 square miles (6.4 km^{2}), of which 2.5 square miles (6.4 km^{2}) is land and 0.04 square mile (0.1 km^{2}) (0.80%) is water.

== Demographics ==
Historical population
| Census | Pop. | Note | %± |
|---|---|---|---|
| 2000 | 1,454 | | — |
| 2010 | 2,557 | | 75.9% |
| 2020 | 3,070 | | 20.1% |
Source: U.S. Census Bureau

=== 2020 census ===
As of the 2020 census, Daleville had a population of 3,070. The median age was 53.4 years. 17.1% of residents were under the age of 18 and 34.1% were 65 years of age or older. For every 100 females, there were 90.4 males, and for every 100 females age 18 and over, there were 89.4 males.

94.5% of residents lived in urban areas, while 5.5% lived in rural areas.

There were 1,241 households in Daleville, of which 21.4% had children under the age of 18 living in them. Of all households, 56.4% were married-couple households, 13.9% were households with a male householder and no spouse or partner present, and 27.1% were households with a female householder and no spouse or partner present. About 31.1% of all households were made up of individuals, and 21.5% had someone living alone who was 65 years of age or older.

There were 1,334 housing units, of which 7.0% were vacant. The homeowner vacancy rate was 1.1%, and the rental vacancy rate was 8.3%.

Racial composition as of the 2020 census
| Race | Number | Percent |
|---|---|---|
| White | 2,837 | 92.4% |
| Black or African American | 72 | 2.3% |
| American Indian and Alaska Native | 1 | 0.0% |
| Asian | 32 | 1.0% |
| Native Hawaiian and Other Pacific Islander | 0 | 0.0% |
| Some other race | 16 | 0.5% |
| Two or more races | 112 | 3.6% |
| Hispanic or Latino (of any race) | 58 | 1.9% |

=== 2010 census ===
As of the census of 2010, there were 2,557 people residing in the CDP, an increase of over 75% from the 2000 census. There were 1,154 housing units. The racial makeup of the CDP was 96.7% White, 1.8% African American, 0.1% Native American, 0.7% Asian, 0.0% Pacific Islander, 0.0% from other races, and 0.7% from two or more races. Hispanic or Latino of any race were 0.9% of the population.

=== 2000 census ===
As of the census of 2000, there were 1,454 people, 562 households, and 477 families residing in the CDP. The population density was 588.9 people per square mile (227.3/km^{2}). There were 573 housing units at an average density of 232.1/sq mi (89.6/km^{2}). The racial makeup of the CDP was 97.32% White, 1.51% African American, 0.21% Native American, 0.41% Asian, 0.14% from other races, and 0.41% from two or more races. Hispanic or Latino of any race were 1.03% of the population.

There were 562 households, out of which 31.1% had children under the age of 18 living with them, 77.9% were married couples living together, 4.8% had a female householder with no husband present, and 15.1% were non-families. 14.2% of all households were made up of individuals, and 7.1% had someone living alone who was 65 years of age or older. The average household size was 2.59 and the average family size was 2.85.

In the CDP, the population was spread out, with 23.3% under the age of 18, 4.0% from 18 to 24, 24.7% from 25 to 44, 32.0% from 45 to 64, and 16.0% who were 65 years of age or older. The median age was 44 years. For every 100 females there were 100.8 males. For every 100 females age 18 and over, there were 96.0 males.

The median income for a household in the CDP was $65,278, and the median income for a family was $65,972. Males had a median income of $40,230 versus $31,630 for females. The per capita income for the CDP was $29,234. About 1.3% of families and 2.6% of the population were below the poverty line, including 5.9% of those under age 18 and none of those age 65 or over.

== Economy ==
=== Botetourt Center at Greenfield ===
The Botetourt Center at Greenfield is a large business park located in the northern portion of the Daleville area. Development of the park began in the early 1990s. As of 2022, there are five companies with existing and future operations, employing approximately 1,500 individuals. There are approximately 450 acres remaining at Greenfield for future business development. The remaining acreage is estimated to accommodate development that could create an additional 1,500 to 2,500 jobs.

=== Ballast Point Brewery ===
In June 2017, San Diego–based brewery Ballast Point opened their East Coast facility and Tap Room in the Botetourt Center at Greenfield. Beer production began in September 2017, with the first keg of the company's well-known Grapefruit Sculpin beer being sent to the office of then Virginia Governor Terry McAuliffe in Richmond. In September 2019, Constellation Brands closed the taproom and restaurant areas of the facility, cutting 41 employees. New Belgium Brewing Company acquired the brewery from Constellation Brands in March 2023.

== Recreation ==
The Appalachian Trail crosses U.S. Route 220 along the southern portion of the CDP.

== Government ==
A number of county government offices were relocated from Fincastle to the Botetourt Center at Greenfield in 2020. The County's Board of Supervisors and various boards and commissions also utilize meeting space at the center.

The United States Postal Service operates the Daleville Post Office within the CDP, although some portions of the community have a Troutville ZIP Code.

== Education ==
=== Public schools ===
The CDP is served by Botetourt County Public Schools. Public school students residing in Daleville are zoned to attend either Greenfield Elementary School or Troutville Elementary School, Read Mountain Middle School, and Lord Botetourt High School. Lord Botetourt High School is located in Daleville.

=== Private schools ===
The Roanoke Japanese Saturday School (ロノアーク補習授業校 Ronōaku Hoshū Jugyō Kō), a weekend Japanese educational program, was previously held at the Greenfield Education & Training Center. It closed for an indeterminate period in April 2006, before permanently closing in February 2009.

=== Colleges and universities ===
Virginia Western Community College operates the Greenfield Education & Training Center in Daleville. Virginia Western primarily uses the Greenfield Center for delivery of the career studies certificate in Welding and the career studies certificate in Commercial Heating, Air Conditioning, Ventilation and Refrigeration.

Other nearby higher education institutions are located in Hollins and Roanoke.

== Infrastructure ==
The Western Virginia Water Authority operates the community's water and sanitary sewer systems.

=== Public safety ===
Law enforcement is provided by the Botetourt County Sheriff's Office. Fire protection is provided by the Fincastle Volunteer Fire Department and Troutville Volunteer Fire Department. Emergency medical services are provided by the Botetourt County Department of Fire and EMS. A fire station study completed in 2019 recommended the addition of a fire station in the Daleville area.

== Transportation ==
=== Air ===
The Roanoke-Blacksburg Regional Airport is the closest airport with commercial service to the CDP.

=== Highways ===
- Interstate 81
- U.S. Route 220 (Roanoke Road)

=== Rail ===
The Norfolk Southern operated Cloverdale Branch runs through the CDP. The closest passenger rail service is located in Roanoke.
