= Buchanan Historic District =

Historic district in Virginia, United States

- U.S. National Register of Historic Places
- U.S. Historic district
- Virginia Landmarks Register
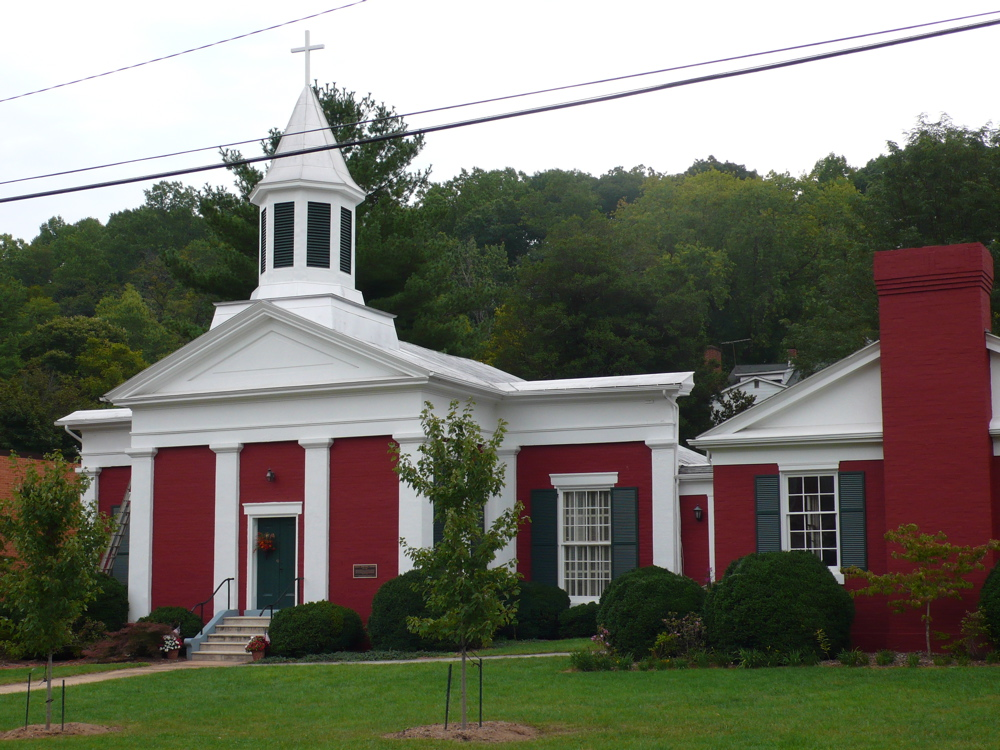
- Trinity Episcopal Church (1842), Buchanan Historic District, September 2008

- Location within Virginia Location within the United States
- Location: Roughly along Main St., from 19th St. to the intersection of US 81 and Main St., Buchanan, Virginia
- Coordinates: 37°31′43″N 79°40′48″W
- Area: 370 acres (150 ha)
- Built: 1850
- Architect: Johnson, Stanhope; et al.
- Architectural style: Greek Revival, Gothic Revival
- NRHP reference No.: 99000070
- VLR No.: 180-0028

Significant dates
- Added to NRHP: January 27, 1999
- Designated VLR: September 14, 1998

Buchanan Historic District is a national historic district located at Buchanan, Botetourt County, Virginia. It encompasses 277 contributing buildings, 5 contributing sites, and 4 contributing structures in Buchanan and Pattonsburg on both sides of the James River. They include commercial, transportation-related, domestic, religious, and industrial resources associated with the community's development from the late-18th century through the late-20th century. Notable buildings include the Pattonsburg Mill (1838), Buchanan Presbyterian Church (1845), Trinity Episcopal Church (1842), Hotel Botetourt (1851), Sorrell House (1850), James Evans Mason Lodge (1884), Virginia Can Company complex (1903), "Oak Hill" (1840), Town Hall Municipal Building, Bank of Buchanan, Ransone's Drugstore, Buchanan Theatre (1919), and Buchanan High School (1928). The contributing sites include the James River & Kanawha Canal project site, Johnston-Boyd Cemetery (1835–1906), and Fairview Cemetery (1854) which included a section for POC called Mountain View which has since been remerged with Fairview. The contributing structures include the Stone Arch Tunnel (1870s). Also located in the district is the separately listed Wilson Warehouse.

It was listed on the National Register of Historic Places in 1999.
