= Nininger's Mill =

Historic former gristmill in Virginia, US

- U.S. National Register of Historic Places
- Virginia Landmarks Register
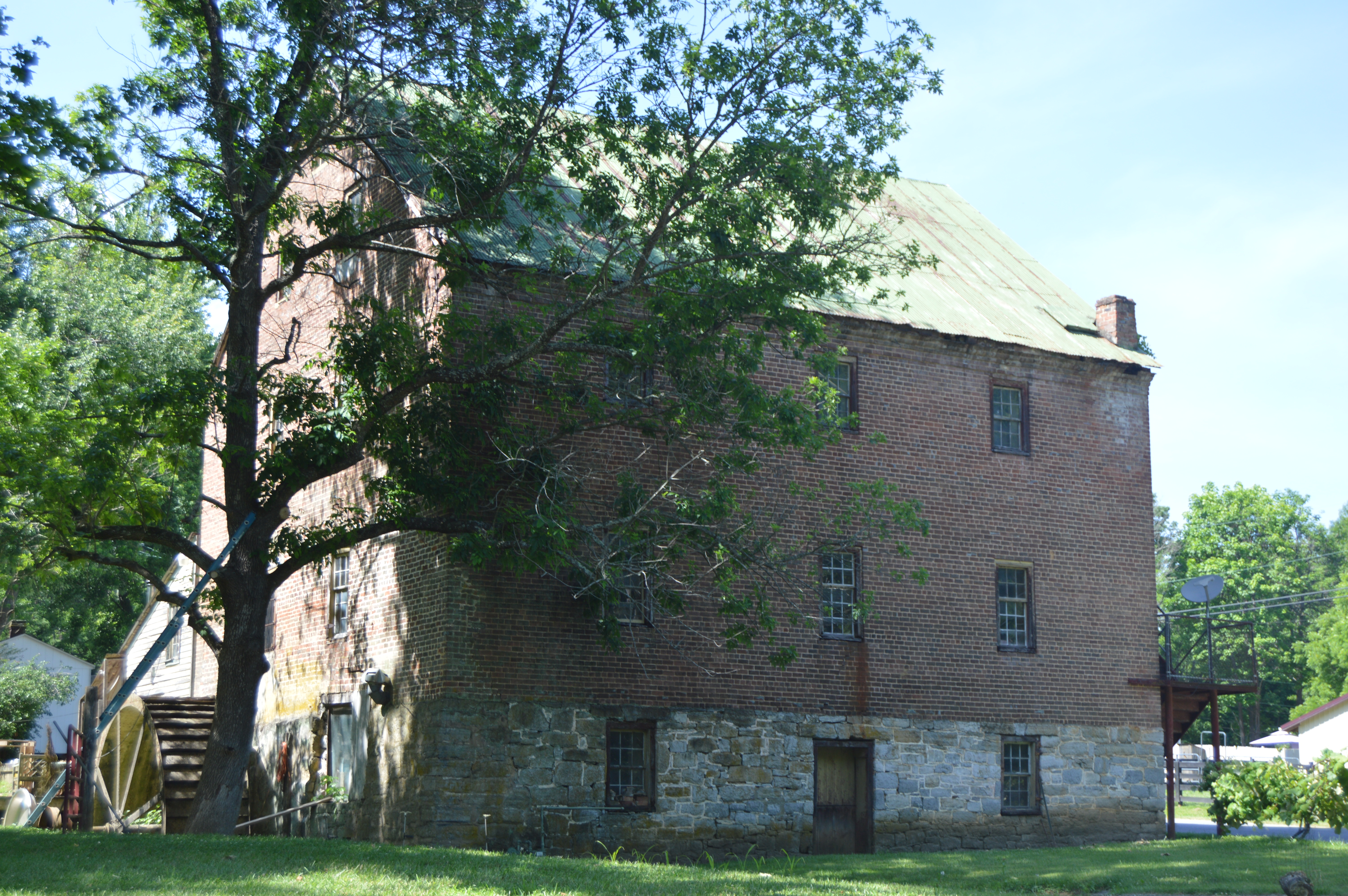
- Front of the mill

- Location within Virginia Location within the United States
- Location: South of Daleville, Virginia
- Coordinates: 37°24′6″N 79°55′7″W
- Area: 1.3 acres (0.53 ha)
- Built: 1847
- NRHP reference No.: 80004171
- VLR No.: 011-0057

Significant dates
- Added to NRHP: July 30, 1980
- Designated VLR: May 20, 1980

Nininger's Mill, also known as Tinker Mill, is a historic gristmill located near Daleville, Botetourt County, Virginia. The mill was built about 1847, and is a three-story, brick structure with a gable roof. Wood-frame additions added in the 20th century, are found on the north and east walls. Also on the property is a contributing simple one-story, wood-frame late 19th-century house. The mill was converted to a restaurant in 1980.

It was listed on the National Register of Historic Places in 1980.
