= Troutville, Virginia =

- Town
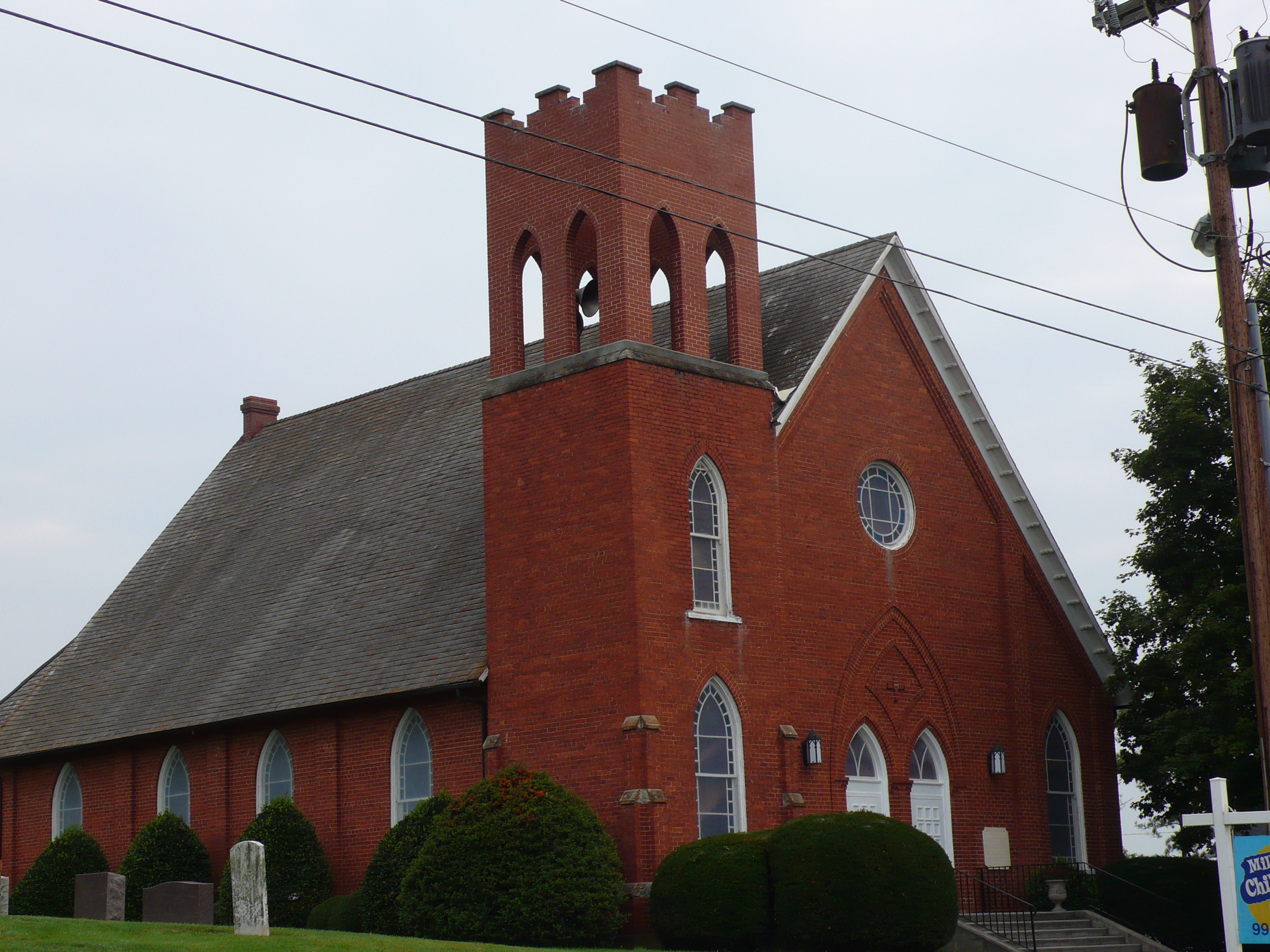
- Mill Creek Baptist Church

- Logo

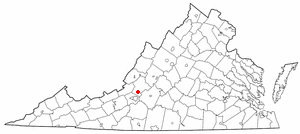
- Location of Troutville, Virginia
- Coordinates: 37°24′55″N 79°52′37″W
- Country: United States
- State: Virginia
- County: Botetourt

Area
  - Total: 0.69 sq mi (1.79 km^{2})
  - Land: 0.69 sq mi (1.79 km^{2})
  - Water: 0 sq mi (0.00 km^{2})
- Elevation: 1,391 ft (424 m)

Population (2020)
  - Total: 458
  - Density: 662.7/sq mi (255.87/km^{2})
- Time zone: UTC-5 (Eastern (EST))
  - Summer (DST): UTC-4 (EDT)
- ZIP code: 24175
- Area code: 540
- FIPS code: 51-79472
- GNIS feature ID: 1493720
- Website: https://townoftroutville-va.gov/

Troutville is a town in Botetourt County, Virginia, United States. The population was 458 at the 2020 census. The town is located along the U.S. Route 11 between Cloverdale and Buchanan. It is part of the Roanoke metropolitan area.

== History ==
The railroad reached this location in 1881, and a station was built, but the area had no name. As three nearby houses were occupied by the brothers John, Jim, and Jorge Trout, the area was called Troutsville. It became an important shipping center in the 1890s. In 1895, Troutsville was a thriving town with an active shipping point, farming, canneries, packing houses and factories. The name of the town was later changed to Troutville. The town was chartered on June 4, 1956.

The Thomas D. Kinzie House and Bryan McDonald Jr. House are listed on the National Register of Historic Places.

== Geography ==
Troutville is located at 37°24′55″N 79°52′37″W (37.415406, -79.876967

According to the United States Census Bureau, the town has a total area of 0.9 square mile (2.3 km^{2}), all land.

In 2018, Troutville leaders discussed a boundary line adjustment to add 2,600 acres to the town limits, seven times its current size.

== Demographics ==
Historical population
Census	Pop.	Note	%±
1960	524		—
1970	522		−0.4%
1980	496		−5.0%
1990	455		−8.3%
2000	432		−5.1%
2010	431		−0.2%
2020	458		6.3%
U.S. Decennial Census

=== 2020 census ===
As of the census of 2020, there were 458 people residing in the town. There were 244 housing units. The racial makeup of the town was 93.9% White, 0.2% African American or Black, 0.0% American Indian, 0.4% Asian, 0.0% Pacific Islander, 0.2% from other races, and 5.2% from two or more races. Hispanic or Latino of any race were 2.0% of the population.

=== 2010 census ===
As of the census of 2010, there were 431 people, 194 households, and 126 families living in the town. The population density was 478.9 people per square mile (187.4/km^{2}). There were 226 housing units at an average density of 251.1 per square mile (98.3/km^{2}). The racial makeup of the town was 94.9% White, 1.2% African American, 0.2% Native American, 0.2% Asian, 0.9% from other races, and 2.6% from two or more races. Hispanic or Latino of any race were 2.6% of the population.

There were 194 households, out of which 25.8% had children under the age of 18 living with them, 49.5% were married couples living together, 12.4% had a female householder with no husband present, and 35.1% were non-families. 29.4% of all households were made up of individuals, and 8.8% had someone living alone who was 65 years of age or older. The average household size was 2.22 and the average family size was 2.74.

In the town, the population was spread out, with 21.3% under the age of 18, 7.6% from 18 to 24, 24.6% from 25 to 44, 26.9% from 45 to 64, and 19.7% who were 65 years of age or older. The median age was 41.8 years. For every 100 females there were 103.3 males. For every 100 females aged 18 and over, there were 98.2 males.

The median income for a household in the town was $55,341, and the median income for a family was $56,379. Males had a median income of $50,917 versus $34,250 for females. The per capita income for the town was $24,630. About 5.0% of families and 5.2% of the population were below the poverty line, including 16.0% of those under age 18 and none of those age 65 or over.

== Parks and recreation ==
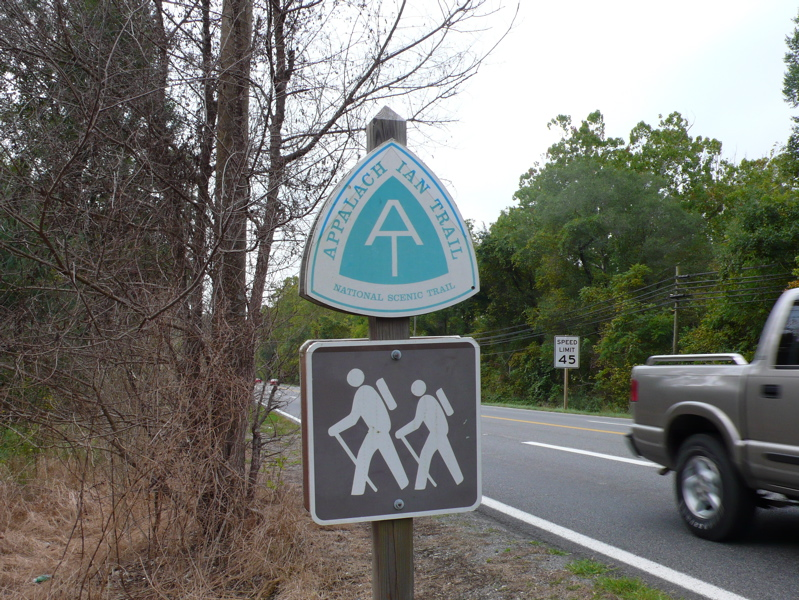
The Appalachian Trail Crossing U.S. Route 11 in Troutville, Virginia.

The Appalachian Trail crosses U.S. Route 11, just south of the town limits. Troutville has been named an Appalachian Trail Community by the Appalachian Trail Conservancy.

U.S. Bicycle Route 76 traverses through the town following Valley Road, U.S. Route 11, and Stoney Battery Road.

The town maintains one park, known as Troutville Town Park. The park features several shelters, a quarter-mile paved walking trail, playground equipment, tennis and basketball courts. A Norfolk Southern caboose is also displayed at the park. The park is regularly used by hikers that come off the Appalachian Trail and cyclists from the U.S. Bicycle Route 76 and hosts a number of annual events and festivals.

== Government ==
Troutville operates a Mayor–council form of government. Troutville Town Council is composed of a mayor and six council members who are elected at-large.

The United States Postal Service operates the Troutville Post Office within the town.

Law enforcement is provided by the Botetourt County Sheriff's Office. Fire protection is provided by the Troutville Volunteer Fire Department, which operates a fire station within the CDP. Emergency medical services are provided by the Botetourt County Department of Fire and EMS, which operates an ambulance out of the Troutville fire station.

== Education ==
Troutville is served by Botetourt County Public Schools. Public school students residing in Troutville are zoned to attend Troutville Elementary School, Read Mountain Middle School, and Lord Botetourt High School.

The closest higher education institutions are located in Hollins and Roanoke.

== Infrastructure ==
The Town operates its own water system, while the Western Virginia Water Authority maintains the Town's sanitary sewer system.

== Transportation ==
=== Airports ===
The Roanoke-Blacksburg Regional Airport is the closest airport with commercial service to the town.

=== Road ===
- U.S. Route 11

=== Rail ===
The Norfolk Southern operated Roanoke Subdivision runs through the town. The closest passenger rail service is located in Roanoke.
