= Lauderdale (Buchanan, Virginia) =

Historic house in Virginia, United States

- U.S. National Register of Historic Places
- Virginia Landmarks Register
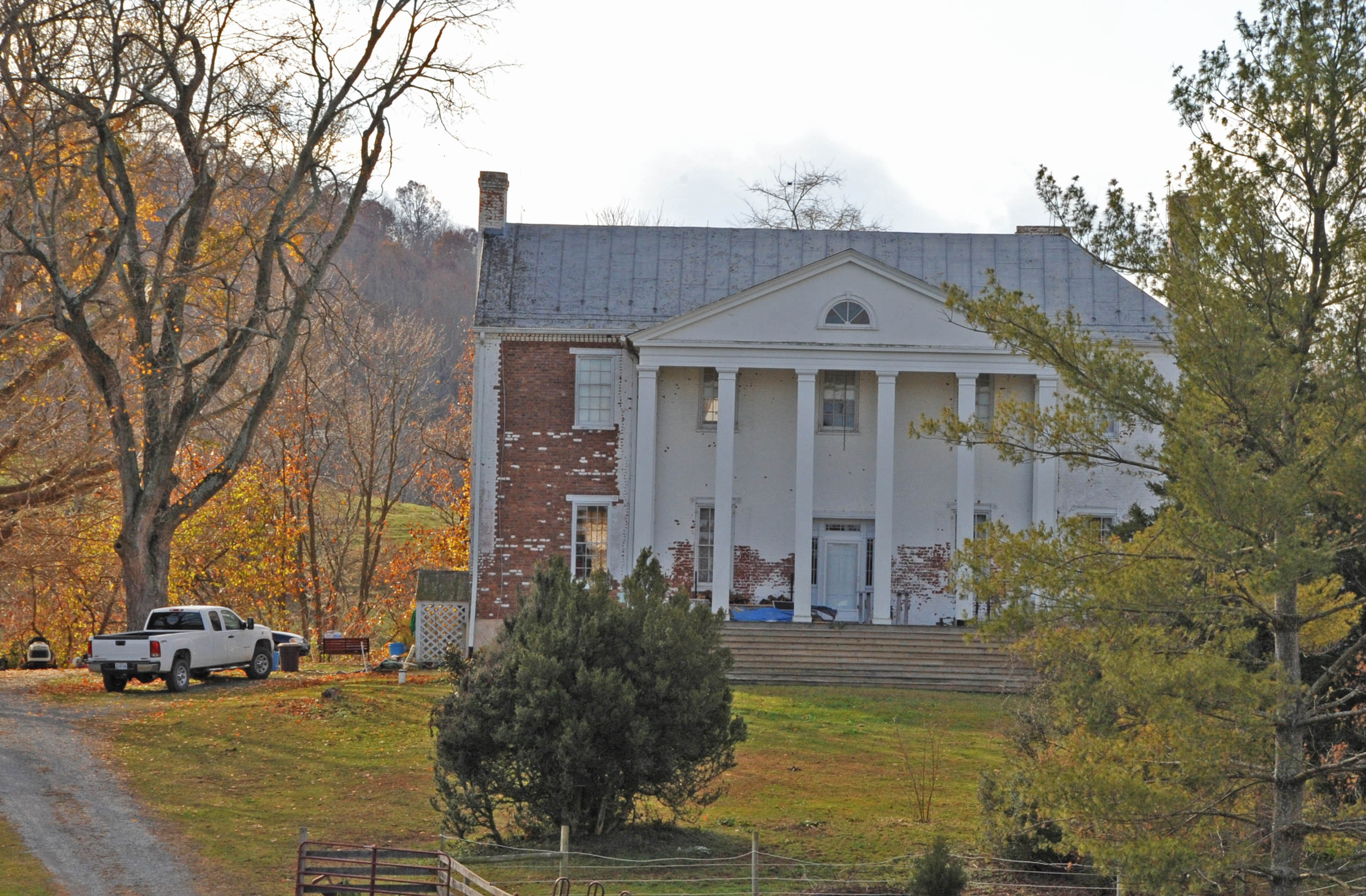

- Location within Virginia Location within the United States
- Location: 13508 Lee Hwy., near Buchanan, Virginia
- Coordinates: 37°29′27″N 79°49′36″W
- Area: 12.3 acres (5.0 ha)
- Built: c. 1821, c. 1840, 1926
- Architectural style: Federal, Greek Revival, Colonial Revival
- NRHP reference No.: 07001132
- VLR No.: 011-0048

Significant dates
- Added to NRHP: October 31, 2007
- Designated VLR: September 5, 2007

Lauderdale is a historic home located near Buchanan, Botetourt County, Virginia. Lauderdale takes its name from the eighteenth century owner of the property, James Lauderdale Sr. Lauderdale purchased 366 acres on Looney Mill Creek in 1749. By the early 1780s, he owned over a thousand acres in Botetourt County, and in 1785 he was listed as the owner of a dwelling and three other buildings. The home Lauderdale was built in 1790 by James Lauderdale Sr. Lauderdale Sr. settled in the area in 1730, when the region was still in the possession of the Indians. The mansion 'Lauderdale' was built near a spring, near which it is said that Lauderdale shot and killed an Indian during an attack on his home. The plantation consisted of 1200 acres, Lauderdale is one of the largest houses in Botetourt. There are thirty rooms within its walls. The high ceilings and hand carved woodwork of the immense hallway, library, and drawing room make it one of the handsomest houses is Virginia. The bricks on its walls were made by slaves on the place. In 1796, Lauderdale sold 444 acres, including his residence to Col. Henry Bowyer (ca. 1760–1832). Most references to Lauderdale incorrectly show the date of its construction as 1821, yet the Botetourt County Deed Book VI, page 36, clearly shows the subsequent owner of the mansion from Lauderdale's son, James Lauderdale Jr., a Col. Henry Bowyer, having purchased the home in 1796.

A famous book named 'Rose - A Woman of Color" centers around a legal case involving this slave named Rose, daughter of Jenny. Jenny was one of the slaves owned by Mr. Lauderdale at the time. Lauderdale was always the center of attention in Botetourt, much like Tara in" Gone With The Wind". Many galas, weddings and community get-togethers were held at the grand mansion. Another famous slave was Pleasant Richardson, who during the Civil War escaped from the Lauderdale plantation and became a Union soldier in the 45th United States Colored Infantry Regiment. After the war he came back to Virginia and settled in nearby Fincastle, Virginia, where he became a property owner.

The house has been added to or otherwise remodeled on at least two subsequent occasions, about 1840 and about 1926. It is a two-story, brick dwelling that has a one-room-deep, center-passage-plan form with a five-bay north-facing front elevation, a two-story ell, and a rear addition built about 1926. It features Greek Revival style decorative details and a Colonial Revival style portico added in 1926. Also on the property are a contributing privy and outbuilding.

The side sun room was added and later converted into a closed room. Descendants of the Lauderdale family purchased the house in the mid-1970s and rebuilt the wall on the left side of the house as it was beginning to fall. The structure was built in a manner of a number of bricks on the lower levels with a diminishing number of layers as the structure rose. The kitchen was added on the back of the house and featured a double restaurant-type walk in refrigerator and freezer My family once owned Lauderdale. My great-great-grandfather was President of the Bank of Buchanan and gifted the house to my great-grandfather, O.T. Mundy. My grandfather was born on the property, and I have visited the property many times. At a point in time, Edward Johnston sold the property to Edward J. McCulloch. Four years later McCulloch sold Lauderdale to James Mundy. Mundy gave his son Oliver T. Mundy the use of the house and farm. Oliver lived at Lauderdale with his wife Laura Rader Mundy and a son, Armand P. Mundy (b. ca. 1892). Oliver Mundy kept a team of Percheron horses on the farm which he used to maintain area roads. Oliver later built a house across the road and moved there.

It was listed on the National Register of Historic Places in 2007.
