= Gilmore Mills, Virginia =

- Unincorporated community
- Location within Virginia Location within the United States
- Coordinates: 37°36′31″N 79°32′29″W
- Country: United States
- State: Virginia
- County: Rockbridge
- Elevation: 781 ft (238 m)
- Time zone: UTC-5 (Eastern (EST))
  - Summer (DST): UTC-4 (EDT)
- Area code: 276
- GNIS feature ID: 1492998

Gilmore Mills is an unincorporated community in Rockbridge County, Virginia, United States. Gilmore Mills is located on the James River, 5.3 miles (8.5 km) west-southwest of Glasgow.

Annandale and the Varney's Falls Dam were listed on the National Register of Historic Places in 1993.
