= Bryan McDonald Jr. House =

Historic house in Virginia, United States

- U.S. National Register of Historic Places
- Virginia Landmarks Register
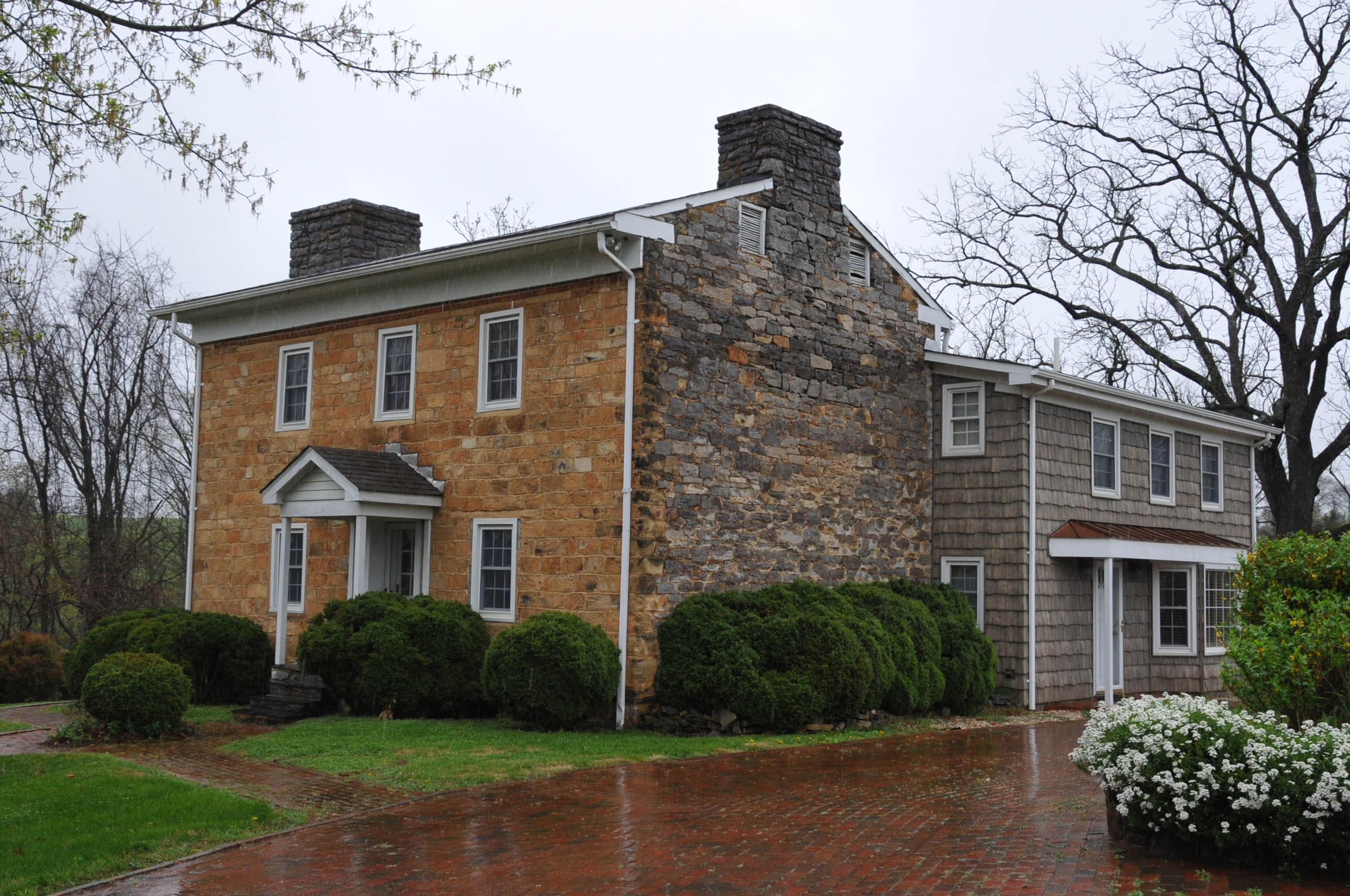

- Location within Virginia Location within the United States
- Location: 4084 Catawba Rd., Troutville, Virginia
- Coordinates: 37°26′40″N 79°57′58″W
- Area: 5.914 acres (2.393 ha)
- Built: c. 1755, c. 1840
- NRHP reference No.: 11000604
- VLR No.: 011-0021

Significant dates
- Added to NRHP: August 24, 2011
- Designated VLR: June 16, 2011

Bryan McDonald Jr. House is a historic home located at Troutville, Botetourt County, Virginia. It was built about 1766, and is a two-story, three-bay, side-gable, Georgian Period stone building with a two-story brick ell added about 1840. Also attached is a modern, two-story frame addition. The front facade is of coursed sandstone blocks and side and rear elevations of limestone. Also on the property are the contributing remains of a rectangular stone barn (c. 1770).

It was listed on the National Register of Historic Places in 2011.
