= Varney's Falls Dam =

- U.S. National Register of Historic Places
- U.S. Historic district – Contributing property
- Virginia Landmarks Register
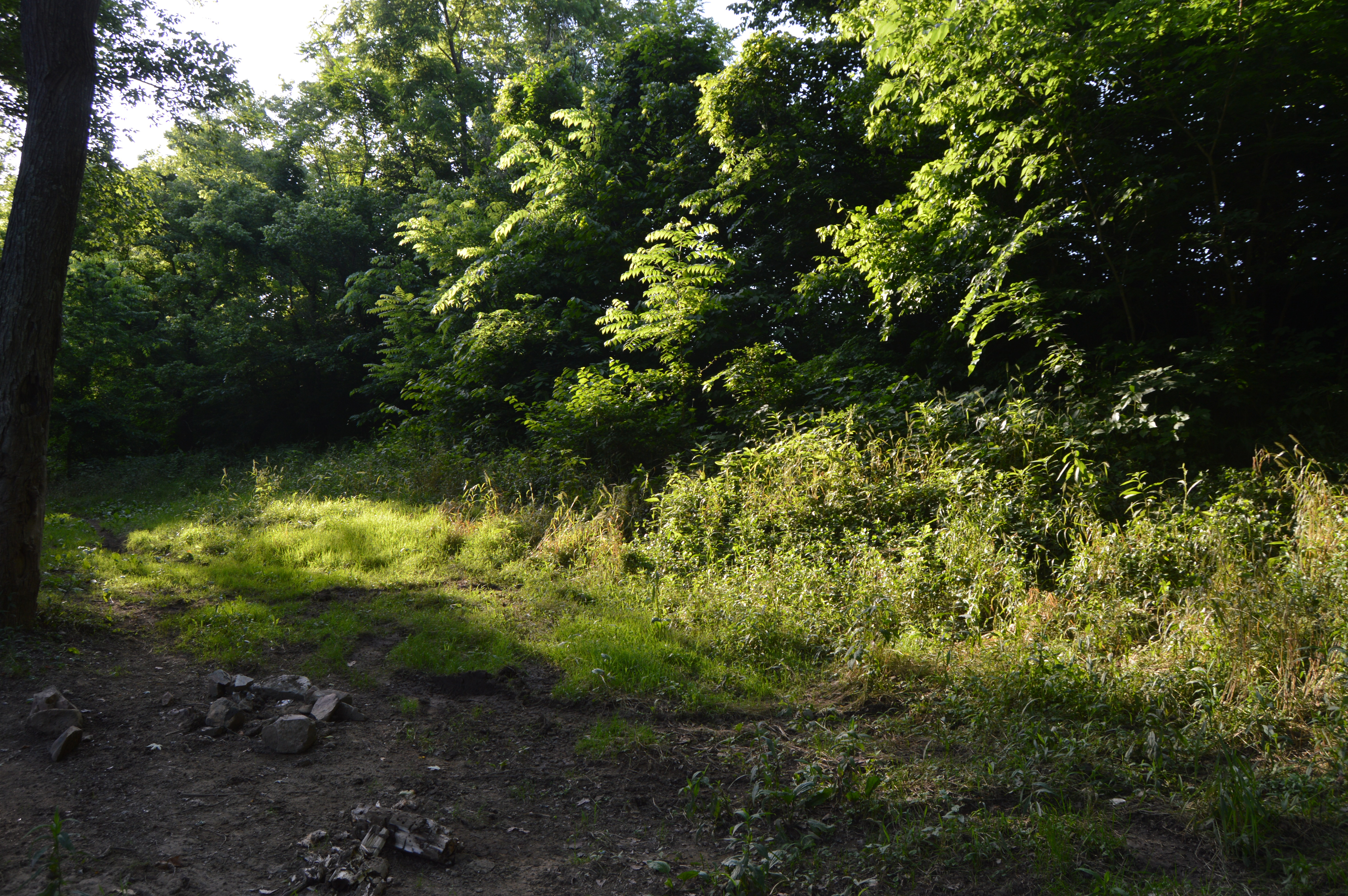
- Towpath near the culvert abutment

- Location within Virginia Location within the United States
- Location: 1 mi. E of jct. of VA 608 and VA 609 on the James River, near Gilmore Mills, Virginia
- Coordinates: 37°34′52″N 79°35′50″W
- Area: 61 acres (25 ha)
- Built: 1851
- Built by: Scott, Charles
- Architectural style: Stone lock
- Part of: James River and Kanawha Canal Historic District (ID71000982)
- NRHP reference No.: 93001127
- VLR No.: 011-0068

Significant dates
- Added to NRHP: October 14, 1993
- Designated CP: August 26, 1971
- Designated VLR: August 18, 1993

Varney's Falls Dam is a historic lock and dam structure located on the James River near Gilmore Mills, Botetourt County, Virginia. It was built in 1851, and is a massive limestone structure. The lock chamber measures 100 feet long between gate recesses, 15 feet wide, and approximately 21 feet from the top on the upriver end to ground level. Associated with the lock are the lock and dam abutment structures, the remaining towpaths, canal bed, berm bank, towpath culvert and remnants of a towpath bridge. The dam was destroyed in 1881, and the lock gates removed in 1885.

It was listed on the National Register of Historic Places in 1993. It is part of the James River and Kanawha Canal Historic District.
