= Haymakertown, Virginia =

Unincorporated community in Virginia, United States

Haymakertown
- Unincorporated community
- Location within the Commonwealth of Virginia Haymakertown (the United States)
- Coordinates: 37°27′58″N 79°58′14″W
- Country: United States
- State: Virginia
- County: Botetourt
- Time zone: UTC−5 (Eastern (EST))
  - Summer (DST): UTC−4 (EDT)

Haymakertown is an unincorporated community in Botetourt County, Virginia, United States.

The Anderson House was listed on the National Register of Historic Places in 1999.
