= Blue Ridge Hall =

- U.S. National Register of Historic Places
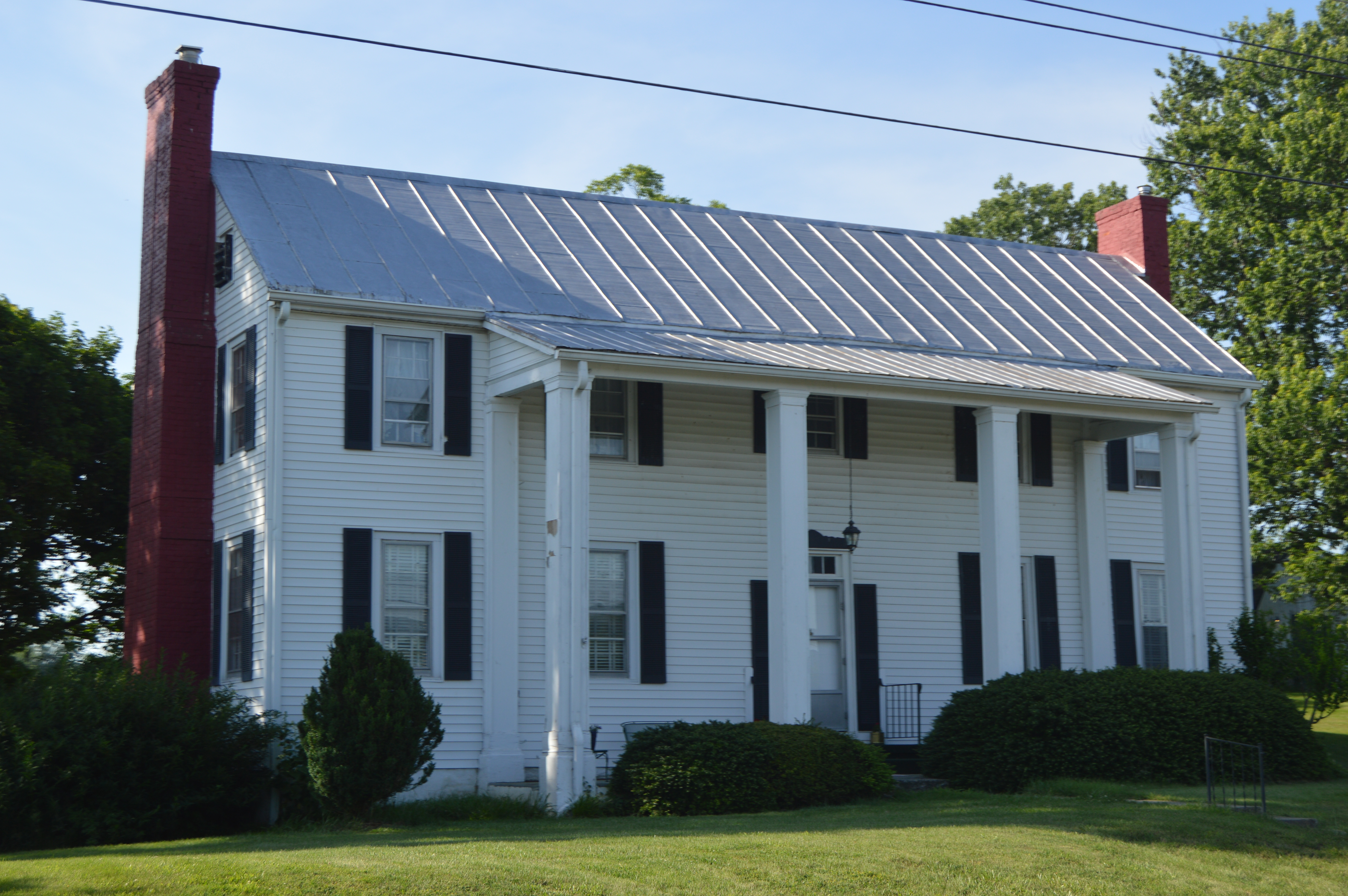

- Location within Virginia Location within the United States
- Location: 11593 U.S. Route 11, near Fincastle, Virginia
- Coordinates: 37°28′20″N 79°47′41″W
- Area: 9 acres (3.6 ha)
- Built: 1836
- Architectural style: Federal
- NRHP reference No.: 16000794
- Added to NRHP: November 20, 2016

Blue Ridge Hall is a historic stagecoach hotel at 11593 U.S. Route 11 in central eastern Botetourt County, Virginia. Located on the historic main road down the Shenandoah Valley, it is a two-story wood-frame structure, with a gabled roof and clapboarded exterior, and a 20th-century Colonial Revival porch across the front. It was built about 1836, and is a well-preserved example of a Federal style antebellum house, later used as a tavern and stagecoach stop.

The property was listed on the National Register of Historic Places in 2016.

== See also ==
- National Register of Historic Places listings in Botetourt County, Virginia
