= Thomas D. Kinzie House =

Historic house in Virginia, United States

- U.S. National Register of Historic Places
- Virginia Landmarks Register
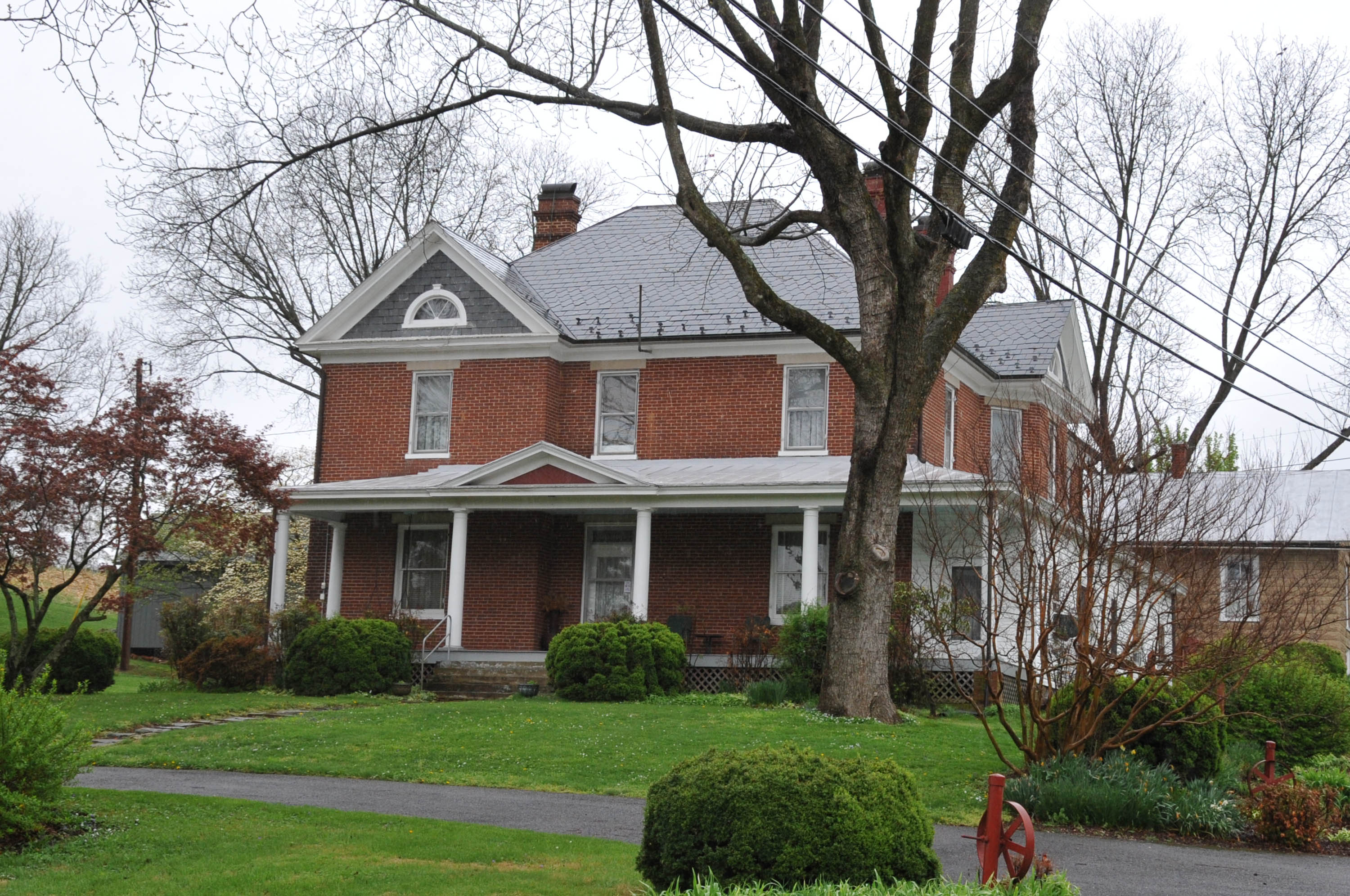

- Location within Virginia Location within the United States
- Location: 65 Kinzie Rd., Troutville, Virginia
- Coordinates: 37°23′45″N 79°53′55″W
- Area: 7 acres (2.8 ha)
- Built: 1909-1911
- Built by: Miller, H.M.
- Architectural style: Queen Anne
- NRHP reference No.: 02000445
- VLR No.: 011-5034

Significant dates
- Added to NRHP: April 26, 2002
- Designated VLR: June 13, 2001

Thomas D. Kinzie House is a historic home located at Troutville, Botetourt County, Virginia. It was built between 1909 and 1911, and is a 2 1/2-story, brick dwelling in the Queen Anne style. It features a complex slate-covered hipped roof with projecting, pedimented gables, and a one-story wraparound porch. Also on the property are a contributing raised-face concrete block and frame spring house, a raised-face concrete block garage, two sheds and a large frame bank barn.

It was listed on the National Register of Historic Places in 2002.
