= Anderson House (Haymakertown, Virginia) =

Historic house in Virginia, United States

- U.S. National Register of Historic Places
- Virginia Landmarks Register
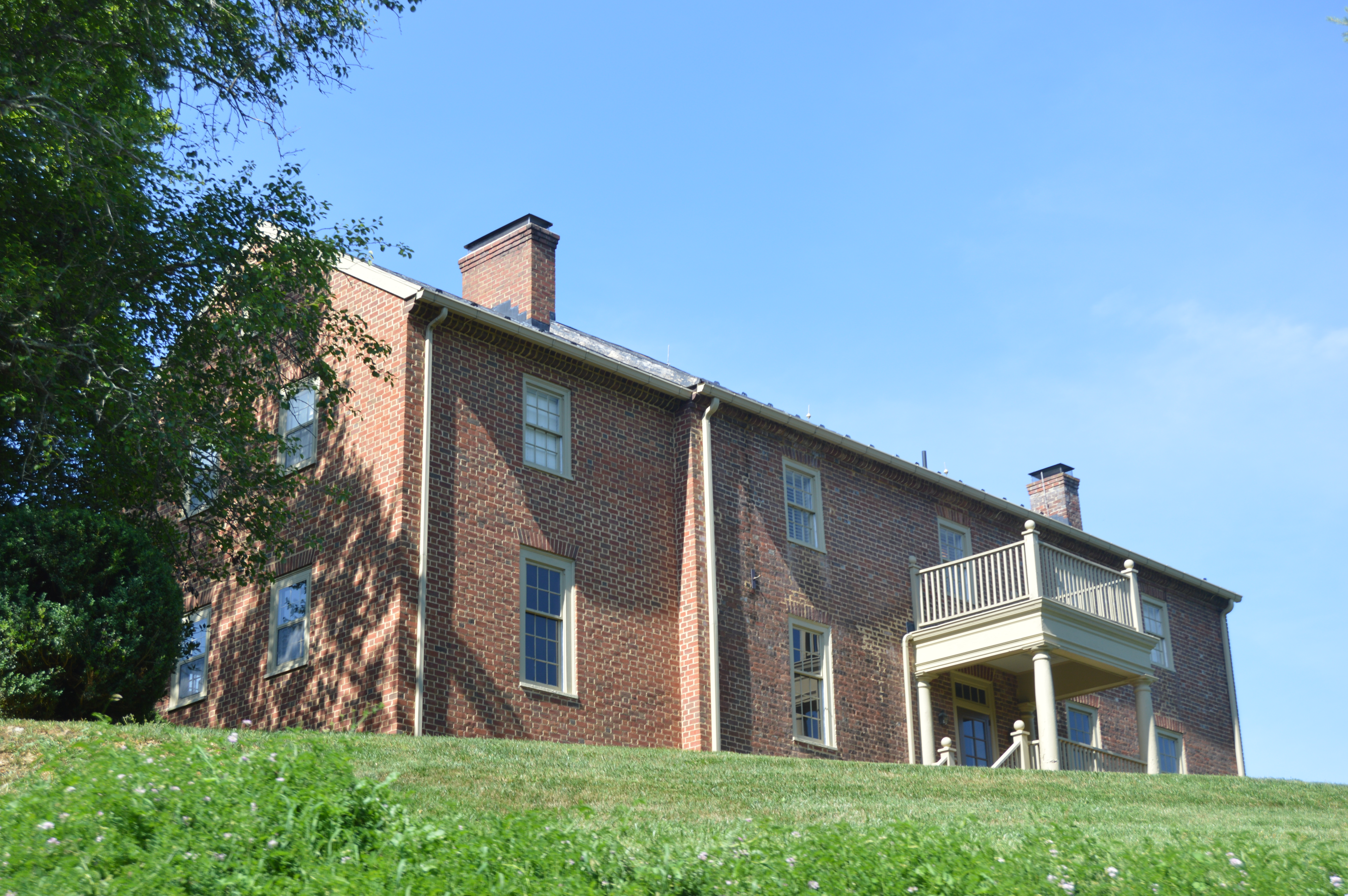
- Front of the house

- Location within Virginia Location within the United States
- Location: 5640 Lee Ln., Haymakertown, Virginia
- Coordinates: 37°28′37″N 79°58′02″W
- Area: 47 acres (19 ha)
- Built: 1828
- Architectural style: Federal
- NRHP reference No.: 98000696
- VLR No.: 011-0056

Significant dates
- Added to NRHP: February 25, 1999
- Designated VLR: September 17, 1997

Anderson House is a historic home located at Haymakertown, Botetourt County, Virginia. It was built about 1828, and is a two-story, central-passage-plan dwelling with an unusual asymmetrical four-bay principal facade. A two-story brick west wing and a single story frame ell, were added in 1969. Also on the property are a contributing early 19th-century meathouse, a small frame, early 20th-century barn, and the site of a 19th-century mill pond.

It was listed on the National Register of Historic Places in 1999.
