= Annandale (Gilmore Mills, Virginia) =

Historic house in Virginia, United States

- U.S. National Register of Historic Places
- Virginia Landmarks Register
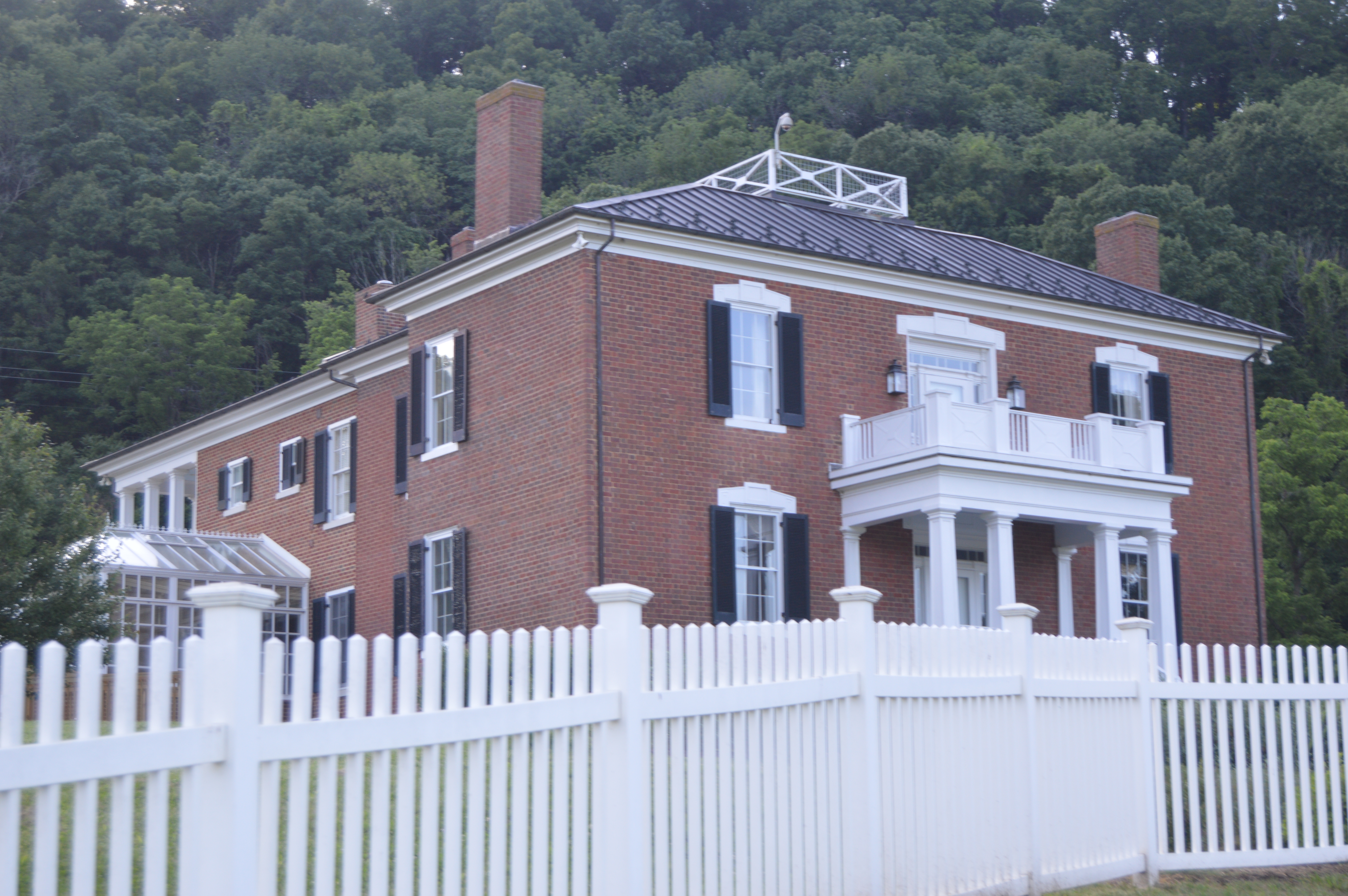
- Southern side and front

- Location within Virginia Location within the United States
- Location: VA 608, 1.5 mi. E of jct. with VA 609, Gilmore Mills, Virginia
- Coordinates: 37°35′43″N 79°34′41″W
- Area: 34.5 acres (14.0 ha)
- Built: 1835
- Architectural style: Greek Revival
- NRHP reference No.: 93000039
- VLR No.: 011-0041

Significant dates
- Added to NRHP: February 11, 1993
- Designated VLR: December 9, 1992

Annandale, also known as Alpine Farms, is a historic home located at Gilmore Mills, Botetourt County, Virginia. It was built in 1835, and is a two-story, Greek Revival-style brick dwelling with a deck-on-hip roof. It has a one-story, three-bay, wooden front porch with tapering square columns. A two-story brick west wing and a single story frame ell, were added in 1969. Also on the property is a contributing brick dairy or meathouse.

It was listed on the National Register of Historic Places in 1993.
