= Wilson Warehouse =

Historic commercial building in Virginia, United States

- U.S. National Register of Historic Places
- Virginia Landmarks Register
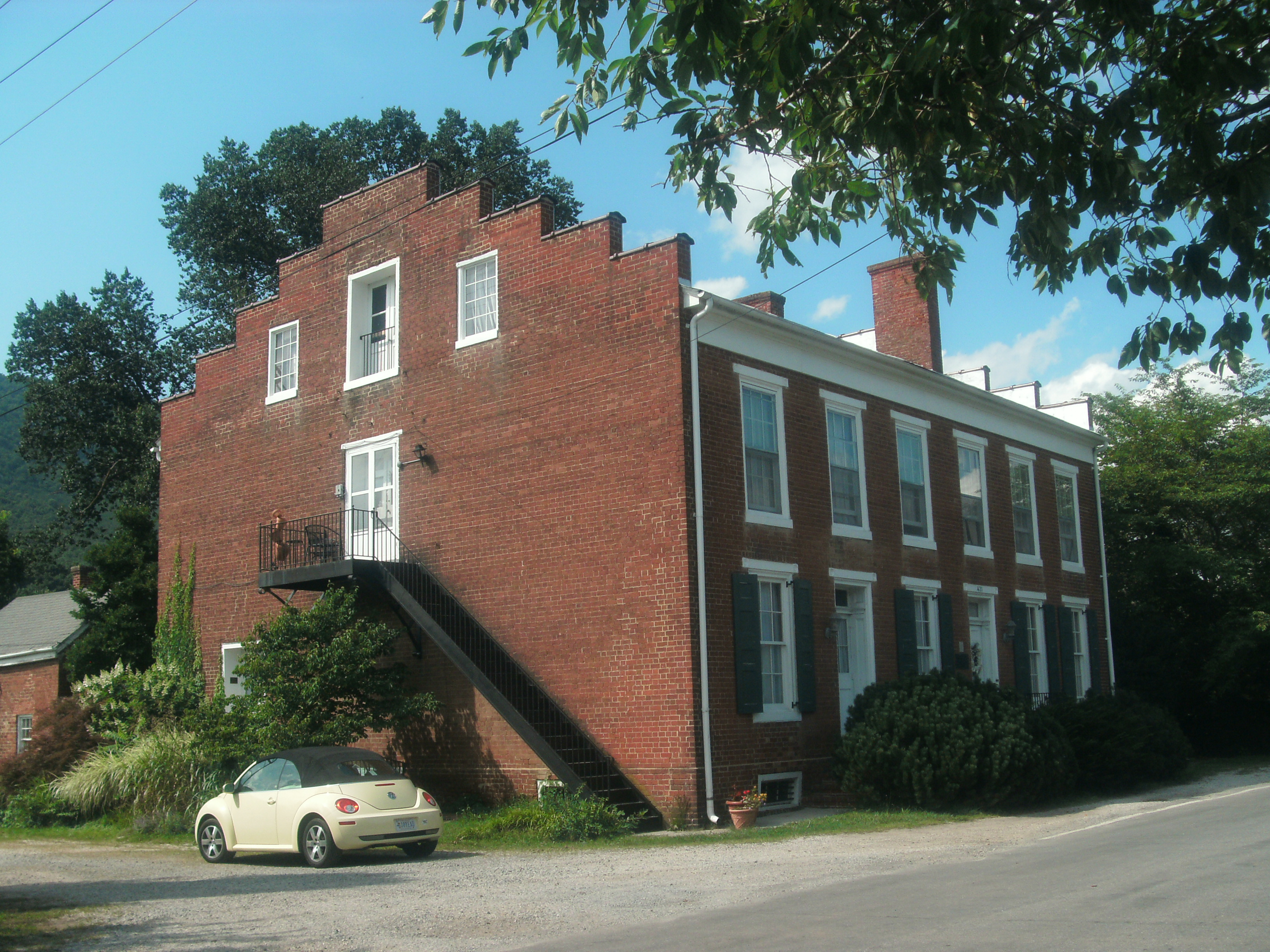
- Wilson Warehouse in July, 2016

- Location within Virginia Location within the United States
- Location: Lower and Washington Sts., Buchanan, Virginia
- Coordinates: 37°31′38″N 79°40′57″W
- Area: less than one acre
- Built: 1839
- Architectural style: Greek Revival
- NRHP reference No.: 78003008
- VLR No.: 180-0006

Significant dates
- Added to NRHP: January 26, 1978
- Designated VLR: July 17, 1977

Wilson Warehouse is a historic combined dwelling, warehouse, and store building located at Buchanan, Botetourt County, Virginia. It was built in 1839, and is a two-story, six-bay, brick building in the Greek Revival style. It measures 54 feet by 48 feet

It was listed on the National Register of Historic Places in 1978.
