= Buchanan, Virginia =

- Town
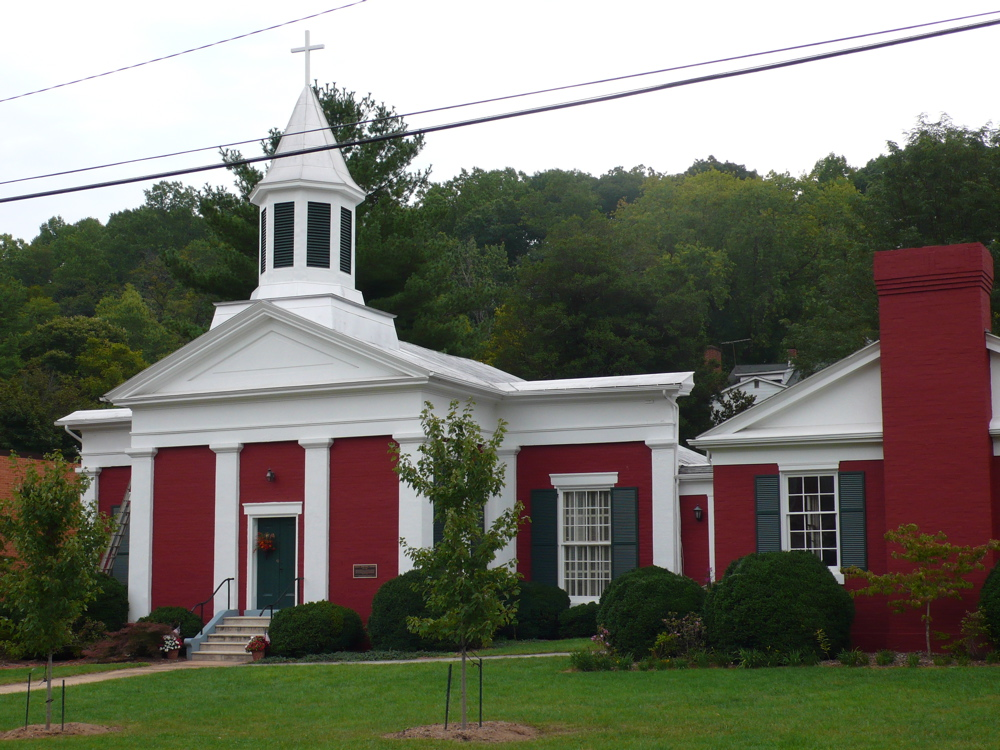
- Trinity Episcopal Church in Buchanan, Virginia (1842)

- Seal

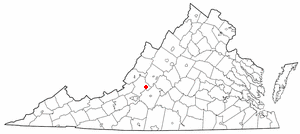
- Location of Buchanan, Virginia
- Coordinates: 37°31′31″N 79°41′0″W
- Country: United States
- State: Virginia
- County: Botetourt

Government
  - Mayor: Sue Way
  - Town Manager: Tim Mack

Area
  - Total: 2.22 sq mi (5.74 km^{2})
  - Land: 2.17 sq mi (5.62 km^{2})
  - Water: 0.046 sq mi (0.12 km^{2})
- Elevation: 850 ft (259 m)

Population (2020)
  - Total: 1,196
  - Density: 551/sq mi (213/km^{2})
- Time zone: UTC-5 (Eastern (EST))
  - Summer (DST): UTC-4 (EDT)
- ZIP Code: 24066
- Area codes: 540 and 826
- FIPS code: 51-10744
- GNIS feature ID: 1492652
- Website: www.buchanan-va.gov

Buchanan (/bəˈkænən/ bə-KAN-ən) is a town in Botetourt County, Virginia, United States. The population was 1,196 at the 2020 census. It is part of the Roanoke metropolitan area. It was the western terminus of the James River and Kanawha Canal when construction on the canal ended.

== History ==
The town of Pattonsburg was incorporated in 1788 and was located on the opposite side of the James River. It was named for Colonel James Patton, and was connected to Buchanan via a bridge.

The town of Buchanan was established in 1811; the current town was created in 1882 from a merger of the two towns.

An 1855 gazetteer described Buchanan and Pattonsburg together containing "3 or 4 churches, 1 bank, 1 printing office, and several tobacco factories and mills." Buchanan was named for Virginia colonist John Buchanan (died 1769), a soldier and landowner who built Fort Fauquier on the James River, just south of the town.

The James River & Kanawha Canal project linked the town with the port in Richmond. It was completed in 1851 and brought a great deal of riverside development.

The Buchanan Historic District, Buchanan Theatre, Greyledge, Lauderdale, Looney Mill Creek Site, and Wilson Warehouse are listed on the National Register of Historic Places. Most buildings and structures within the historic district date from the town's large period of development in the late 1800s and early 1900s, which started after the arrival of the railroad and other industries.

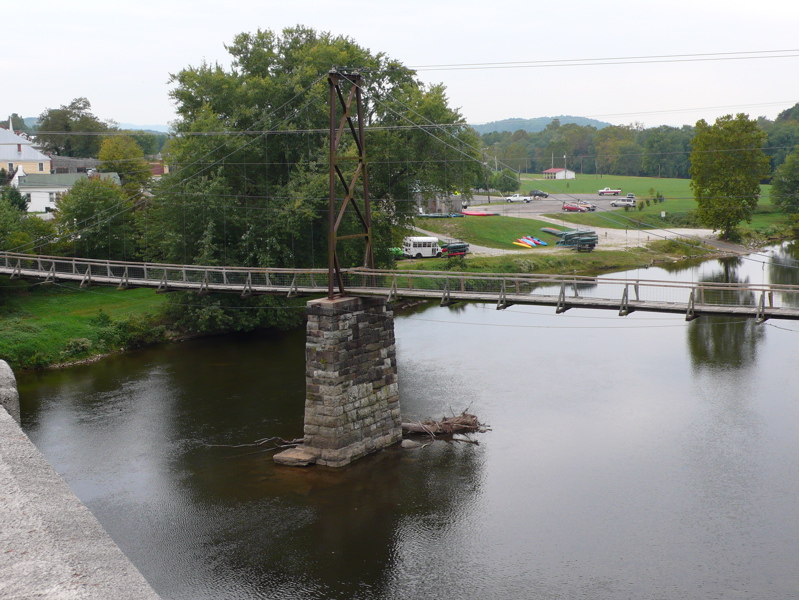
The swinging bridge across the James River in Buchanan, Virginia. Constructed in 1938, the piers of the bridge were built in 1851.

== Geography ==
Buchanan is located at 37°31′31″N 79°41′0″W (37.525177, -79.683405).

According to the United States Census Bureau, the town has a total area of 2.2 square miles (5.8 km^{2}), of which 2.2 square miles (5.6 km^{2}) is land and 0.039 square miles (0.1 km^{2}), or 2.09%, is water.

=== Climate ===
The climate in this area is characterized by hot, humid summers and generally mild to cool winters. According to the Köppen Climate Classification system, Buchanan has a humid subtropical climate, abbreviated "Cfa" on climate maps.

Climate data for Buchanan, Virginia (1991–2020)
Month	Jan	Feb	Mar	Apr	May	Jun	Jul	Aug	Sep	Oct	Nov	Dec	Year
Mean daily maximum °F (°C)	44.1 (6.7)	48.8 (9.3)	56.8 (13.8)	69.5 (20.8)	76.6 (24.8)	83.4 (28.6)	86.5 (30.3)	84.8 (29.3)	78.8 (26.0)	68.1 (20.1)	56.5 (13.6)	47.3 (8.5)	66.8 (19.3)
Daily mean °F (°C)	35.5 (1.9)	38.6 (3.7)	45.9 (7.7)	56.8 (13.8)	65.3 (18.5)	73.1 (22.8)	76.9 (24.9)	75.4 (24.1)	69.0 (20.6)	57.5 (14.2)	46.0 (7.8)	38.5 (3.6)	56.5 (13.6)
Mean daily minimum °F (°C)	26.9 (−2.8)	28.5 (−1.9)	35.1 (1.7)	44.0 (6.7)	54.0 (12.2)	62.8 (17.1)	67.3 (19.6)	66.0 (18.9)	59.2 (15.1)	47.0 (8.3)	35.5 (1.9)	29.8 (−1.2)	46.3 (8.0)
Average precipitation inches (mm)	3.16 (80)	2.68 (68)	3.69 (94)	3.82 (97)	4.44 (113)	3.94 (100)	4.54 (115)	3.03 (77)	4.13 (105)	3.41 (87)	3.28 (83)	3.49 (89)	43.61 (1,108)
Average snowfall inches (cm)	2.5 (6.4)	2.3 (5.8)	1.8 (4.6)	0.1 (0.25)	0.0 (0.0)	0.0 (0.0)	0.0 (0.0)	0.0 (0.0)	0.0 (0.0)	0.0 (0.0)	0.0 (0.0)	4.7 (12)	11.4 (29.05)
Source: NOAA

== Demographics ==
Historical population
Census	Pop.	Note	%±
1880	414		—
1890	802		93.7%
1900	716		−10.7%
1910	792		10.6%
1920	802		1.3%
1930	825		2.9%
1940	868		5.2%
1950	1,300		49.8%
1960	1,349		3.8%
1970	1,326		−1.7%
1980	1,205		−9.1%
1990	1,222		1.4%
2000	1,233		0.9%
2010	1,178		−4.5%
2020	1,196		1.5%
U.S. Decennial Census

=== 2020 census ===
As of the census of 2020, there were 1,196 people living in the town. The population density was 540 people per square mile (210/km^{2}). There were 596 housing units. The racial makeup of the town was 91.9% White, 3.1% Black, 0.3% American Indian, 0.3% Asian, 0.0% Pacific Islander, 0.8% Other, and 3.7% from two or more races. Hispanic or Latino of any race were 1.8% of the population.

=== 2000 census ===
As of the census of 2000, there were 1,233 people, 540 households, and 359 families living in the town. The population density was 510.1 people per square mile (196.7/km^{2}). There were 579 housing units at an average density of 239.5 per square mile (92.4/km^{2}). The racial makeup of the town was 90.84% White, 7.95% African American, 0.08% Native American, 0.32% Asian, and 0.81% from two or more races. Hispanic or Latino of any race were 0.73% of the population.

There were 540 households, out of which 25.4% had children under the age of 18 living with them, 51.5% were married couples living together, 11.3% had a female householder with no husband present, and 33.5% were non-families. 29.4% of all households were made up of individuals, and 15.6% had someone living alone who was 65 years of age or older. The average household size was 2.28 and the average family size was 2.79.

In the town, the population was spread out, with 20.6% under the age of 18, 6.6% from 18 to 24, 29.2% from 25 to 44, 23.9% from 45 to 64, and 19.7% who were 65 years of age or older. The median age was 41 years. For every 100 females, there were 88.5 males. For every 100 females age 18 and over, there were 86.1 males.

The median income for a household in the town was $32,500, and the median income for a family was $37,443. Males had a median income of $29,405 versus $20,565 for females. The per capita income for the town was $16,238. About 6.9% of families and 10.5% of the population were below the poverty line, including 14.2% of those under age 18 and 9.2% of those age 65 or over.

== Government ==
Buchanan operates a council–manager form of government. Buchanan Town Council is composed of a mayor and four council members who are elected at-large.

The United States Postal Service operates the Buchanan Post Office within the town.

=== Governance issues ===
Between 2017 and 2026, 8 people, 5 permanent and 3 interim, have filled the role of town manager for Buchanan. The town has also had 5 treasurers in less than 3 years. Councilmember Jamie Manspile has been blamed for this revolving door due to an abrasive personality and bullying, making subtle references to retaliation, obstructing staff function and hiring processes, trying to require town staff to use time clocks without having the authority to do so, ignorning communications protocols, and independently negotiating with vendors and making purchases without coordinating with the town manager. Cardinal News obtained multiple text exchanges by Manspile in which he discussed town staff members who needed to be fired. Manspile has also allegedly clashed with other councilmembers and mayors, some of whom resigned due to clashes with Manspile. This included reading a letter, that Manspile claimed to have found on his windshield, aloud at a council meeting accusing a mayor of sexual harassment; these allegations could not be proven after an investigation by Royer Law Firm in Roanoke that cost the town 16 thousand dollars in general funds, but the mayor still resigned.

Manspile rejects these allegations, saying a clique in the town wants to blame everything on him and that most of the former town managers no longer work as town managers, which he argued to be evidence of their ineffectiveness in the role. Cardinal News cited multiple citizens also accused Manspile and his family of using intimidation tactics against them and accused other councilmembers of always voting with Manspile, they also said that there were issues with cliques in the town. One of the councilmembers who votes with Manspile also said that he spends a lot of unpaid time dealing with maintenance issues around town, with which Manspile agrees, while also expressing that he feels underappreciated for this work and that discussions of ending utility management are an attempt to remove his influence.

An independent review of communication among town staff found that communication among staff was hampered primarily by Manspile. Executive director Michelle Gowdy of the Virginia Municipal League said that the town tried hard but has been a "tough town" on issues of council detachment from daily operations under the council-manager form of government, but that issues of high turnover and a lack of detachment aren't rare among smaller towns due to their smaller populations and tax bases.

== Education ==
The town is served by Botetourt County Public Schools. Public school students residing in Buchanan are zoned to attend Buchanan Elementary School, Central Academy Middle School, and James River High School.

== Infrastructure ==
The Town operates its own water and sanitary sewer systems. They contract with Inboden, a utility management firm based in Mount Jackson, at a cost of about $200,000 a year. The town council has debated whether to continue managing this service themselves.

=== Public safety ===
Law enforcement is provided by the Botetourt County Sheriff's Office.

Fire protection services are provided by the Botetourt County Department of Fire and EMS. The department operates a fire station within the town. Historically, the Buchanan Volunteer Fire Department was responsible for fire protection in the town and surrounding areas. However, in 2012, the volunteer department dissolved its charter and transitioned into a volunteer component of the county's fire and EMS department.

Emergency medical services are also provided by the Botetourt County Department of Fire and EMS. The department operates an ambulance out of the Buchanan fire station. Previously, the Buchanan Rescue Squad provided emergency medical services to the town and surrounding area. In 2010, Botetourt County began taking measures to aid the rescue squad which had been struggling with low volunteer participation.

== Transportation ==
=== Roads ===
U.S. Route 11 runs through the center of town as Main Street. Interstate 81 runs along the northwest side of the town, with access from Exit 167 to the north and Exit 162 to the south, both with Route 11. State Route 43 crosses the James River with Route 11 in the center of town; Route 43 leads northwest up the James River to U.S. Route 220 at Eagle Rock and southeast to the Blue Ridge Parkway and the Peaks of Otter.

=== Rail ===
The CSX-operated James River Subdivision and Norfolk Southern-operated Roanoke District both run through the town.

== Notable people ==
- Mary Johnston, novelist and women's rights activist
- Matthew Ramsey, songwriter and lead singer of country-rock music group Old Dominion, who conducts annual fundraisers in the town to benefit the local food bank
- Hughie Thomasson, musician and member of Outlaws and Lynyrd Skynyrd born in Buchanan
- James Patton, first sheriff of Augusta County, owned a "small stone house" around 1750 at Cherry Tree Bottom, across the James River from Buchanan.
- John Buchanan, who lived for many years in the Anchor and Hope Plantation just west of the town.
