= Antioch Township, Illinois =

Antioch Township
- Township
- Seal

- Location in Lake County
- Coordinates: 42°27′52″N 88°06′41″W
- Country: United States
- State: Illinois
- County: Lake
- Established: November 6, 1849

Area
  - Total: 42.18 sq mi (109.2 km^{2})
  - Land: 34.77 sq mi (90.1 km^{2})
  - Water: 7.41 sq mi (19.2 km^{2}) 17.57%
- Elevation: 804 ft (245 m)

Population (2020)
  - Total: 27,535
  - Density: 791.9/sq mi (305.8/km^{2})
- Time zone: UTC-6 (CST)
  - Summer (DST): UTC-5 (CDT)
- FIPS code: 17-097-01608
- Website: www.antiochtownshipil.gov

Antioch Township is a township in the U.S. state of Illinois, located in Lake County. The population was 27,535 at the 2020 census.

== Geography ==
According to the 2021 census gazetteer files, Antioch Township has a total area of 42.18 square miles (109.25 km^{2}), of which 34.77 square miles (90.05 km^{2}) (or 82.43%) is land and 7.41 square miles (19.19 km^{2}) (or 17.57%) is water. There are many lakes in this township, including Antioch Lake, Benet Lake, Bluff Lake, Channel Lake, Cross Lake, Deer Lake, Dunns Lake, East Loon Lake, Elmwood Farms Lake, Grass Lake, Homer White Lake, Huntley Lake, Lake Catherine, Lake Marie, Lake Tranquility, Loon Lake, Petite Lake, Redwing Slough Lake, Silver Lake, Spring Lake, and Turner Lake.

=== Cities and towns ===
- Antioch
- Channel Lake
- Fox Lake (east quarter)
- Lake Catherine
- Lake Villa (north edge)

=== Adjacent townships/towns/villages ===
- Salem Lakes, Wisconsin (north)
- Bristol, Wisconsin (northeast)
- Randall, Wisconsin (northwest)
- Newport Township (east)
- Lake Villa Township (southeast)
- Grant Township (southwest)
- McHenry Township, McHenry County (southwest)
- Burton Township, McHenry County (west)

=== Cemeteries ===
The townships primary export is cemeteries: The most famous of which are Grass Lake, Hickory Union and Hillside.

=== Major highways ===
- U.S. Route 45
- Illinois Route 59
- Illinois Route 83
- Illinois Route 173

=== Airports and landing strips ===
- Antioch Airport (historical)
- Donald Alfred Gade Airport
- Fox Lake Seaplane Base

== Demographics ==
As of the 2020 census there were 27,535 people, 10,868 households, and 7,465 families residing in the township. The population density was 652.87 inhabitants per square mile (252.07/km^{2}). There were 12,633 housing units at an average density of 299.54 per square mile (115.65/km^{2}). The racial makeup of the township was 84.91% White, 2.12% African American, 0.37% Native American, 2.16% Asian, 0.07% Pacific Islander, 2.46% from other races, and 7.91% from two or more races. Hispanic or Latino of any race were 8.99% of the population.

There were 10,868 households, out of which 31.70% had children under the age of 18 living with them, 54.70% were married couples living together, 10.71% had a female householder with no spouse present, and 31.31% were non-families. 27.00% of all households were made up of individuals, and 11.70% had someone living alone who was 65 years of age or older. The average household size was 2.50 and the average family size was 3.03.

The township's age distribution consisted of 21.7% under the age of 18, 8.0% from 18 to 24, 20.8% from 25 to 44, 32.9% from 45 to 64, and 16.6% who were 65 years of age or older. The median age was 44.6 years. For every 100 females, there were 100.6 males. For every 100 females age 18 and over, there were 101.1 males.

The median income for a household in the township was $86,952, and the median income for a family was $106,010. Males had a median income of $54,884 versus $41,877 for females. The per capita income for the township was $42,072. About 6.9% of families and 8.5% of the population were below the poverty line, including 10.3% of those under age 18 and 7.1% of those age 65 or over.

Historical population
Census	Pop.	Note	%±
2010	27,745		—
2020	27,535		−0.8%
U.S. Decennial Census

== Education ==
=== Emmons School District 33 ===
The schools in the district include:

Public elementary schools

- Emmons Grade School, Antioch, grades K-8;

=== Antioch Community Consolidated School District 34 ===
The schools in the district include:

Public elementary schools

- Antioch Elementary School, Antioch, grades 2–5;
- Grass Lake Elementary School, Antioch, grades PK-8;
- Hillcrest Elementary School, Antioch, grades PK-2;
- Oakland Elementary School, Antioch, grades 2–5;
- W C Petty Elementary School, Antioch, grades 2–5;

Public middle school

- Antioch Upper Grade School, Antioch, grades 6–8;

=== Community High School District 117 ===
The schools in the district include:

Public high school

- Antioch Community High School, Antioch, grades 9-12;
