= John Peck =

John Peck may refer to:

- John Peck (naval architect) (1725–1790), American merchant and naval architect of the revolution era
- John Peck (diplomat) (1913–1995), British ambassador to Senegal, 1962–1966, and Ireland, 1970–1973
- John Peck (politician) (1922–2004), British communist politician
- John Peck (footballer) (1937–1993), Australian rules footballer, played for Hawthorn, 1954–1968
- John Peck (poet) (born 1941), American poet
- John Peck (cartoonist) (1942–2025), American cartoonist known as the Mad Peck
- John Peck (amputee) (born c. 1985), American veteran and quadruple amputee
- John Peck (baseball) (born 2002), American professional baseball player
- John C. Peck (1828–?), American businessman and building contractor
- John E. L. Peck (1918–2013), first permanent head of the computer science department at the University of British Columbia
- J. Eddie Peck (John Edward Peck, born 1958), American actor
- John H. Peck (1838–1919), tenth president of Rensselaer Polytechnic Institute
- John J. Peck (1821–1878), U.S. soldier who fought in the Mexican–American War and American Civil War
- John L. Peck (1857–1927), Canadian politician in the Legislative Assembly of New Brunswick
- John M. Peck (died 1985), American politician from Virginia
- John Mason Peck (1789–1858), American Baptist missionary
- John Weld Peck (1874–1937), United States federal judge
- John Weld Peck II (1913–1993), United States federal judge
