= Wheatland County =

Wheatland County is the name of two counties in North America:

- In Canada:
  - Wheatland County, Alberta
- In the United States:
  - Wheatland County, Montana

== See also ==
- Wheatland (disambiguation)
- Wheatland Township (disambiguation)
- Rural Municipality of Wheatlands No. 163, a county-equivalent local government in Saskatchewan, Canada.
