= Wheatland Township, Illinois =

Wheatland Township, Illinois may refer to one of the following townships:

- Wheatland Township, Bureau County, Illinois
- Wheatland Township, Fayette County, Illinois
- Wheatland Township, Will County, Illinois
- there is also: South Wheatland Township, Macon County, Illinois

See also

- Wheatland Township (disambiguation)
