= T. J. Edwards =

American football player (born 1996)

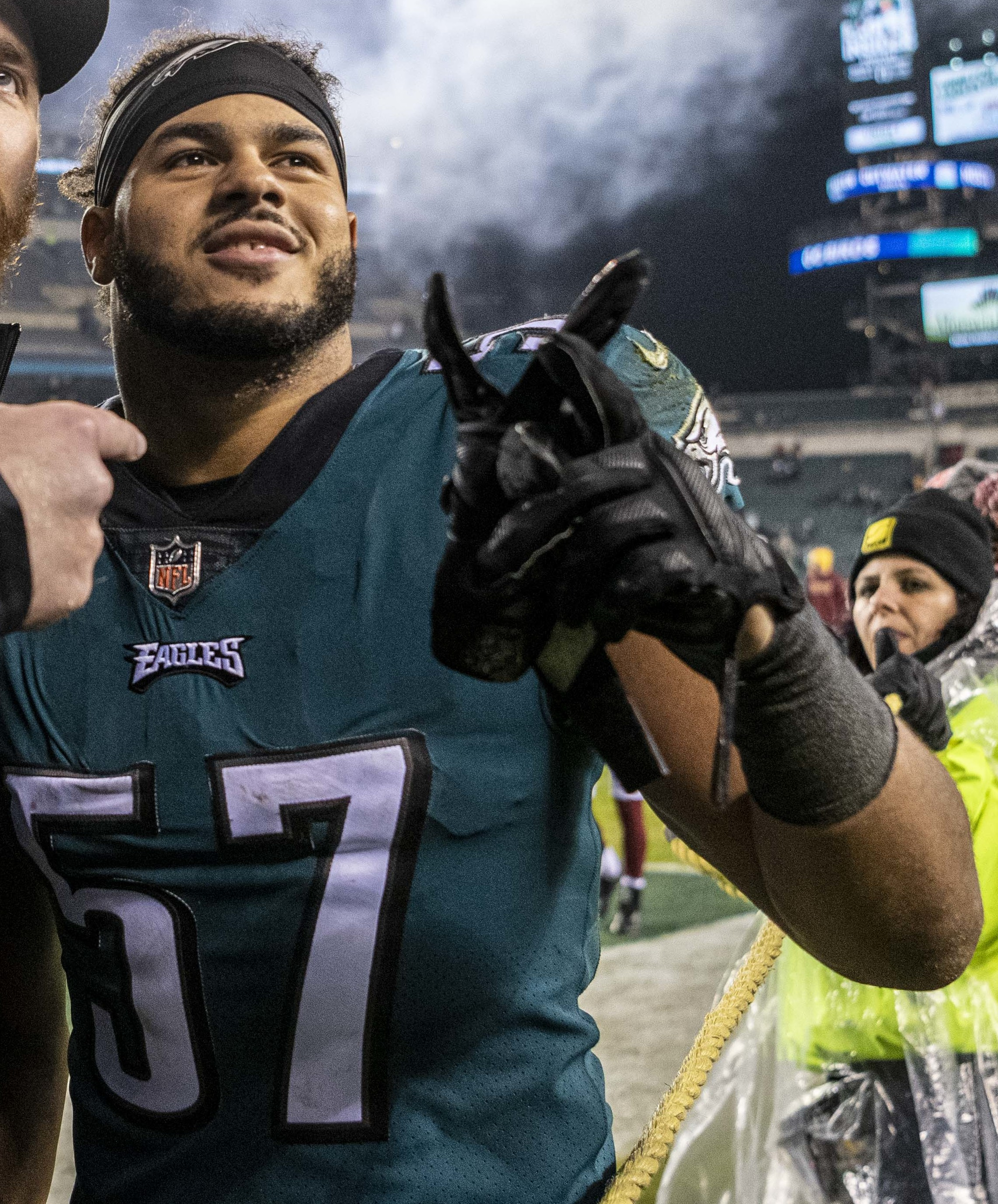
- Edwards with the Philadelphia Eagles in 2021

No. 53 – Chicago Bears
- Position: Linebacker
- Roster status: Active

Personal information
- Born: August 12, 1996 (age 30); Lake Villa, Illinois, U.S.
- Listed height: 6 ft 0 in (1.83 m)
- Listed weight: 228 lb (103 kg)

Career information
- High school: Lakes Community (Lake Villa)
- College: Wisconsin (2014–2018)
- NFL draft: 2019: undrafted

Career history
- Philadelphia Eagles (2019–2022); Chicago Bears (2023–present)

Awards and highlights
- First-team All-American (2017); Freshman All-American (2015); 2× First-team All-Big Ten (2017, 2018)

Career NFL statistics as of Week 5, 2026
- Total tackles: 756
- Sacks: 12.0
- Forced fumbles: 4
- Fumble recoveries: 6
- Pass deflections: 31
- Interceptions: 8
- Defensive touchdowns: 1
- Stats at Pro Football Reference

T. J. Edwards (born August 12, 1996) is an American professional football linebacker for the Chicago Bears of the National Football League (NFL). He played college football for the Wisconsin Badgers.

== Early life ==
Edwards played quarterback at Lakes Community High School in Lake Villa, Illinois. His senior year, he also played three games at Safety. In his three games on defense, he posted 20 tackles, two TFLs, two sacks and an interception.

Despite playing quarterback in high school he recruited for college football as a defensive player. Edwards was originally committed to Western Michigan. However, in early December 2013 Edwards flipped his commitment to Wisconsin after being recruited by Wisconsin's defensive coordinator Dave Aranda.

College recruiting
Name	Hometown	School	Height	Weight	40^{‡}	Commit date
T.J. Edwards; LB	Lake Villa, IL	Lakes Community	6 ft 2 in (1.88 m)	215 lb (98 kg)	-	Dec 2, 2013
T.J. Edwards; LB	Recruit ratings: Scout: Rivals: 247Sports: ESPN: (68)					
Overall recruit ranking: Scout: 46 Rivals: NR
‡ Refers to 40-yard dash; Note: In many cases, Scout, Rivals, 247Sports, On3, and ESPN may conflict in their listings of height, weight and 40 time.; In these cases, the average was taken. ESPN grades are on a 100-point scale.; Sources: "Wisconsin Football Commitment List 2014". Rivals.; "Wisconsin Football Recruiting Commits 2014". Scout.; "Wisconsin Badgers Commits 2014". ESPN.; "Scout.com Team Recruiting Rankings". Scout.; "2014 Team Ranking". Rivals.com.; "247sports.com 2014 Wisconsin Football Commits". 247Sports.

== College career ==
Edwards attended the University of Wisconsin-Madison where he played inside linebacker for the Wisconsin Badgers football team.

=== 2014 ===
Edwards redshirted his freshman year. At the end of the season the team was preparing to play against Auburn in the Outback Bowl. The younger players on the team received extra reps and UW's defensive coordinator Dave Aranda praised Edwards, saying "He was the MVP of that period, in my opinion."

=== 2015 ===
With 2014 starting inside linebackers Marcus Trotter and Derek Landisch graduating and needing to be replaced Edwards was thrown in the mix to become a starter. After spring practice Edwards had earned the starting role alongside Leon Jacobs.

In his redshirt freshman year Edwards started all 13 games. In the season opener Edwards tallied 12 tackles against Alabama. The next three games however he only recorded ten tackles. October 19 Edwards was named Big Ten freshman of the week for his performance against Purdue where he had 16 tackles, 1.5 tackles-for-loss and one forced fumble.

For the season Edwards led the team in tackles, recording 84, 6.5 tackles-for-loss and one forced fumble. At the end of the season Edwards was named to the Football Writers Association of America Freshman All-American team. He was also named honorable mention All-Big Ten by the coaches.

=== College statistics ===
Season	Team	Games		Tackles						Int & Fum			
Season	Team	GP	GS	Solo	Ast	Cmb	TfL	Yds	Sck	Int	PD	FF	FR
2014	Wisconsin	0	0	Redshirted									
2015	Wisconsin	13	13	41	43	84	6.5	11	0.0	0	4	1	0
2016	Wisconsin	13	12	48	41	89	8.5	34	3.0	3	5	1	0
2017	Wisconsin	14	14	53	28	81	11	32	2.0	4	11	0	0
2018	Wisconsin	13	13	73	40	113	11.5	33	3.0	3	5	0	1
Career		53	52	215	152	367	37.5	110	8.0	10	25	2	1

== Professional career ==
Pre-draft measurables
Height	Weight	Arm length	Hand span	Wingspan	40-yard dash	10-yard split	20-yard split	20-yard shuttle	Three-cone drill	Vertical jump	Broad jump	Bench press
6 ft 0 3/8 in (1.84 m)	230 lb (104 kg)	31 1/4 in (0.79 m)	9 3/8 in (0.24 m)	6 ft 3 1/8 in (1.91 m)	4.87 s	1.74 s	2.75 s	4.28 s	7.06 s	32.5 in (0.83 m)	9 ft 4 in (2.84 m)	16 reps
All values from NFL Combine/Pro Day

=== Philadelphia Eagles ===
Edwards went undrafted in the 2019 NFL draft. On April 28, 2019, the Philadelphia Eagles signed Edwards to a three-year, $1.76 million contract that includes a signing bonus of $12,500.

Throughout his first training camp, Edwards competed for a roster spot at linebacker against Nate Gerry, Zach Brown, L. J. Fort, Alex Singleton, and Asantay Brown. Defensive coordinator Jim Schwartz named Edwards the primary backup middle linebacker, behind starter Nigel Bradham, to start his rookie season.

On September 9, 2019, Edwards made his regular season debut in the Eagles' home-opener, appearing only on special teams during a 27–32 win against the Washington Redskins. On October 13, 2019, Edwards earned his first playing time on defense, making four solo tackles in a 20–38 loss at the Minnesota Vikings. In Week 8, Edwards made his first career start at outside linebacker due to a recurring ankle injury to Nigel Bradham, finishing the Eagles' 31–13 victory at the Buffalo Bills with a season-high five combined tackles (two solo). He finished his rookie season in 2019 with a total of 30 combined tackles (15 solo) in 16 games and four starts.

The Philadelphia Eagles finished the 2019 NFL season atop the NFC East, clinching a playoff berth with a 9–7. On January 5, 2020, Edwards made his official postseason debut in the NFC Wildcard Game, making two combined tackles in a 17–9 loss against the Seattle Seahawks.

Edwards entered training camp in 2020 as a possible candidate to be the starting middle linebacker, competing against Jatavis Brown and Davion Taylor, after Nigel Bradham became a free agent. Head coach Doug Pederson named Edwards the starting middle linebacker to start the regular season, alongside outside linebackers Nate Gerry and Duke Riley.

On October 8, 2020, Edwards was placed on injured reserve after suffering a hamstring injury in Week 4. He was activated on October 31, 2020. In Week 8 against the Dallas Cowboys on Sunday Night Football, Edwards recorded a team high 13 tackles and recorded a strip sack on quarterback Ben DiNucci which was recovered and returned by teammate Rodney McLeod for a 53-yard touchdown during the 23–9 win. In Week 17 against the Washington Football Team on Sunday Night Football, Edwards recorded his first career interception off a pass thrown by Alex Smith during the 20–14 loss.

During a Week 5 game against the Carolina Panthers on October 10, 2021, Edwards made a crucial play when he blocked a punt as the Eagles were down 18–13 in the fourth quarter. The Eagles would go on to win the game, 21–18. Edwards was named the NFC Special Teams Player of the Week for his performance.

In Week 11 against the New Orleans Saints, Edwards recorded both an interception and a fumble recovery.

On November 22, 2021, the Philadelphia Eagles signed Edwards to a one-year, $2.20 million contract extension that includes $2.15 million guaranteed upon signing and a signing bonus of $1.18 million.

In 2022, Edwards helped the Eagles reach Super Bowl LVII where they lost 38–35 to the Kansas City Chiefs. In the Super Bowl, Edwards had six tackles and one pass defended.

=== Chicago Bears ===
On March 13, 2023, Edwards' hometown team, the Chicago Bears, signed him to a three-year, $19.50 million contract that includes $7.90 million guaranteed and a signing bonus of $4.50 million. In his Bears debut on September 10 against the Green Bay Packers, Edwards led the team with 14 tackles in the 38–20 loss. Edwards got his first interception as a Bear in Week 11 against the Detroit Lions when he picked off Jared Goff in the 31–26 loss.

In the 2024 season, Edwards started all 17 games and recorded 129 tackles during the season. While playing the Tennessee Titans in Week 1, Edwards tied a single-game career-high with 15 tackles and was tied for first in the league in tackles.

On April 16, 2025, Edwards and the Bears agreed to a two-year, $20 million contract extension. On November 8, head coach Ben Johnson announced that Edwards had undergone surgery to repair a broken hand; he ultimately missed four contests as a result of the injury. In Week 17 against the San Francisco 49ers, Edwards intercepted Brock Purdy's first pass attempt of the game, returning it 34 yards for a touchdown. Edwards fractured his fibula in the Bears' wild card win, ending his season.

== NFL career statistics ==
Legend
**Bold**	Career high

=== Regular season ===
Year	Team	Games		Tackles					Fumbles				Interceptions					
Year	Team	GP	GS	Cmb	Solo	Ast	Sck	TFL	FF	FR	Yds	TD	Int	Yds	Avg	Lng	TD	PD
2019	PHI	16	4	30	15	15	0.0	0	0	0	0	0	0	0	0.0	0	0	0
2020	PHI	12	12	70	37	33	2.0	5	**2**	0	0	0	1	13	13.0	13	0	1
2021	PHI	16	14	130	64	**66**	1.0	5	0	1	0	0	1	1	1.0	1	0	5
2022	PHI	**17**	**17**	**159**	**99**	60	2.0	10	0	1	0	0	0	0	0.0	0	0	**7**
2023	CHI	**17**	**17**	155	91	64	2.5	8	1	**2**	0	0	**3**	4	1.3	2	0	**7**
2024	CHI	**17**	**17**	129	79	50	**4.0**	**12**	1	**2**	0	0	1	0	0	0	0	3
2025	CHI	10	10	67	33	34	0.5	2	0	0	0	0	1	**34**	**34.0**	**34**	**1**	5
2026	CHI	5	5	16	8	8	0.0	2	0	0	0	0	1	0	0.0	0	0	3
Career		110	96	756	426	330	12.0	44	4	6	0	0	8	52	6.5	34	1	31

=== Postseason ===
Year	Team	Games		Tackles					Fumbles				Interceptions					
Year	Team	GP	GS	Cmb	Solo	Ast	Sck	TFL	FF	FR	Yds	TD	Int	Yds	Avg	Lng	TD	PD
2019	PHI	1	0	2	2	0	0.0	0	0	0	0	0	0	0	0.0	0	0	0
2021	PHI	1	1	6	4	2	0.0	0	0	0	0	0	0	0	0.0	0	0	0
2022	PHI	3	3	**13**	**10**	**3**	0.0	0	0	0	0	0	0	0	0.0	0	0	**1**
2025	CHI	1	1	0	0	0	0.0	0	0	0	0	0	0	0	0.0	0	0	0
Career		6	5	21	16	5	0.0	0	0	0	0	0	0	0	0.0	0	0	1

== Personal life ==
Edwards is a Christian. He got engaged to his girlfriend Kelly Jo in January 2022. They got married in March 2023 at Pueblo Bonito Pacifica, Cabo San Lucas.
