= Greenfield (Fincastle, Virginia) =

Historic house in Virginia, United States

- Formerly listed on the U.S. National Register of Historic Places
- Virginia Landmarks Register
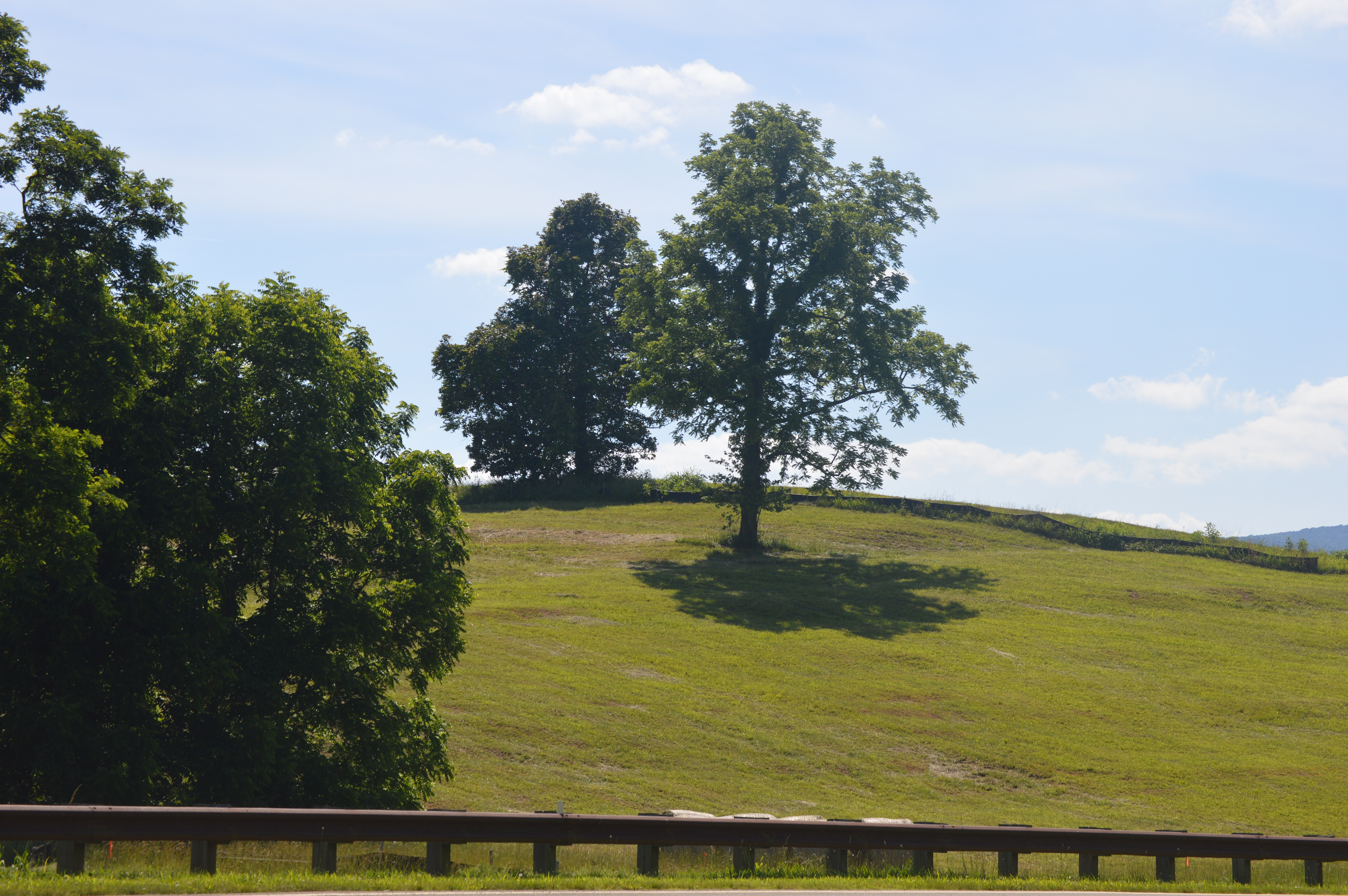
- Overview from the east

- Location within Virginia Location within the United States
- Location: Botetourt Center at Greenfield, U.S. Route 220, Fincastle, Virginia
- Coordinates: 37°26′17″N 79°54′50″W
- Area: 0.86 acres (0.35 ha)
- Built: c. 1832, c. 1850
- NRHP reference No.: 10000792
- VLR No.: 011-0026

Significant dates
- Added to NRHP: June 28, 2011
- Designated VLR: June 17, 2010
- Removed from NRHP: January 6, 2022

Greenfield, also known as Col. William Preston Plantation, Preston House, and Botetourt Center at Greenfield, is a historic plantation site located at Fincastle, Botetourt County, Virginia. The first plantation established by surveyor, militia officer and burgess William Preston (1729-1783) and which used enslaved labor beginning with his purchase of 16 Africans from the ship True Blue on August 28, 1759 in Nanjemoy, Maryland for 752 pounds (to avoid a 5% Virginia sales tax), Greenfield became one of Botetourt County's largest plantations, encompassing more than 1,200 acres by the 1770s. In 1774 Col. Preston moved his family to another plantation, Smithfield, and a series of white overseers managed the farm, orchard and distillery at Greenfield.

There is a marker nearby that was put up in 1999 by the Department of Historic Resources, with the following inscription, "Half a mile west stood Greenfield, the home of Col. William Preston. According to local tradition, Stephen Rentfroe constructed a fort there in the 1740s. In 1759, Preston bought the property from Rentfroe and soon built a house that evolved into a large log-and-frame L-shaped dwelling; a portico supported by two-story columns sheltered the front. Preston became a prominent frontier military leader during the French and Indian War (1754-1763) and the Revolutionary War (1775-1783). He also served in the Virginia House of Burgesses (1765-1771). Greenfield, later the home of Gov. James P. Preston, burned in 1959".

Because fire had destroyed the plantation house in 1959, and the only remaining historic buildings were kitchen/quarters and saddlebag slave dwelling, which were moved to the Bowyer-Holladay House nearby, although listed on the National Register of Historic Places in 2011, Greenfield was delisted in January 2022.

The Virginia Tech’s College of Natural Resources and Environment partnered with the Virginia Department of Historic Resources in order to study the logs used to create the kitchen and slave dwelling and believe the kitchen which is a two-story structure measuring 16 feet by 18 feet on the first floor which features a 4-foot front overhang on the upper storey, is dated 1844 or 1845 and the slave dwelling is dated 1864.
