= Emily Jaenson =

Former baseball executive

- General manager

Teams
- As general manager: Reno Aces (2018–2021)

Emily Jaenson was the general manager of the Reno Aces from 2018 to 2021. When she was hired, she was the only female general manager in Triple-A baseball.

== Career ==
Jaenson's first job out of college was in ticket sales for the Chicago Bulls. She then worked for the Muscular Dystrophy Association before joining the Aces.

When Jaenson joined the Aces in 2013, she led the corporate sponsorship department. She left in 2016. After two year of working in Houston, she returned to Reno as the Aces general manager in 2018.

When she was hired in 2018, it had been nearly two decades since the last woman had been a general manager in the Pacific Coast League, the Triple-A division the Aces play in. As of 2019, she is the only female general manager in Triple-A. She serves on the diversity committee for Minor League Baseball.

In 2021, Jaenson was one of three women in the Aces' leadership structure. Joining Jaenson was Samantha Hicks at the Chief Revenue Officer and Stacey Bowman, serving in the role of Chief Financial Officer.

Jaenson left her position with the Aces after the 2021 season.

== Personal life ==
Jaenson grew up in Lake Villa, Illinois. She played soccer and basketball and ran cross-country and track as a child. She studied advertising at the University of Illinois at Urbana-Champaign. She graduated in 2005.

She is to married to Shawn Jaenson, a Navy veteran, and has two sons, Kennedy and Cooper. In May 2021, she gave birth to her first daughter, Elin. Jaenson is also the host and owner of the Leadership is Female podcast, a series of interviews with female leaders in sports.

== See also ==
- Women in baseball
