= School District 41 =

School District 41 or SD41 may refer to:

Canada:

- Burnaby School District

United States:

- Canton School District 41-1
- Glen Ellyn School District 41
- Lake Villa School District 41
- Rock Island–Milan School District 41
- St. Maries Joint School District 41
