= James Breckinridge =

American lawyer and politician

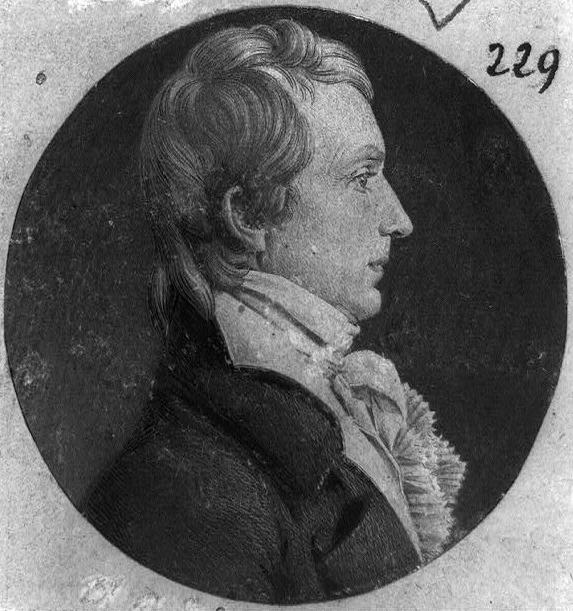

Member of the U.S. House of Representatives from Virginia's 5th district
- In office March 4, 1809 – March 3, 1817
- Preceded by: Alexander Wilson
- Succeeded by: John Floyd

Member of the Virginia House of Delegates from Botetourt County
- In office 1823; Alongside Allen Taylor
- In office 1819–1820; Alongside Jesse Rowland, Thomas Burwell
- In office 1806–1807; Alongside Charles Beale, Andrew Lewis
- In office 1796–1801; Alongside Thomas Madison, John Miller, William McClanahan
- In office 1789–1790; Alongside Robert Harvey, Martin McFerran

Personal details
- Born: March 7, 1763 near Fincastle, Virginia Colony, British America
- Died: May 13, 1833 (aged 70) Botetourt County, Virginia, U.S.
- Party: Federalist
- Education: College of William and Mary; Washington College
- Profession: Attorney

Military service
- Rank: Brigadier-general
- Battles/wars: American Revolutionary War; War of 1812

James Breckinridge (March 7, 1763 – May 13, 1833) was a Virginia lawyer and politician and a member of the Breckinridge family. He served in the Virginia House of Delegates, as well as the U.S. House of Representatives. He also fought in the American Revolutionary War and served as a brigadier-general during the War of 1812.

== Family and early life ==
Breckinridge was born near Fincastle in Botetourt County in the Colony of Virginia. He was the son of Robert Breckinridge whose father had immigrated from Ireland. His mother was the former Leticia Preston. His brother was John Breckinridge and he was the great-great-great-uncle of John Bayne Breckinridge. He married Ann Cary Selden (daughter of Wilson Cary Selden & Elizabeth Jennings) born 1770 died 1843.

He studied under private tutors and during the Revolutionary War, he served in Colonel Preston's rifle regiment under General Nathanael Greene. He attended Washington College (now Washington and Lee University) and graduated from the College of William and Mary in 1785. He studied law and was admitted to the bar and practiced in Fincastle in 1787.

He built Breckinridge Mill in 1822, to replace an earlier mill he built in 1804. It was listed on the National Register of Historic Places in 1980, with a boundary increase in 2002.

== Political career ==
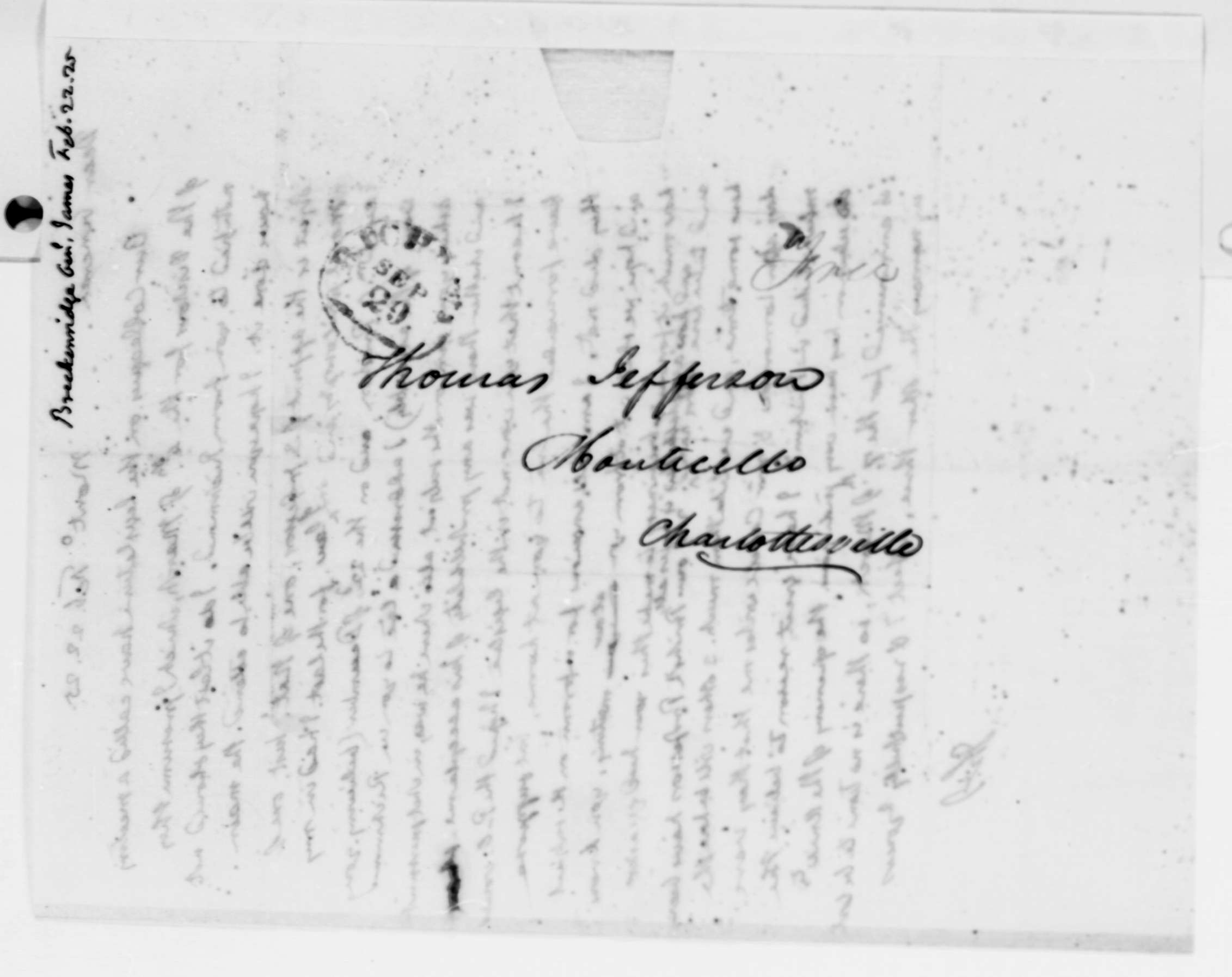
February 22, 1825 letter from Thomas Jefferson to General Breckinridge.

Breckinridge served as a delegate to the Virginia House of Delegates intermittently between 1789 and 1824. He took a special interest in the construction of the Chesapeake and Ohio Canal. He was then elected as a Federalist to the Eleventh Congress and to the three succeeding Congresses (March 4, 1809 – March 3, 1817). He was an associate of Thomas Jefferson in the establishment of the University of Virginia and served as brigadier general in the War of 1812.

=== Elections ===
- 1796; Breckinridge was a candidate for United States Senator, defeated by Democratic-Republican Stevens Thomson Mason
- 1799; Breckinridge was a candidate for Governor, defeated by Democratic-Republican James Monroe
- 1809; Breckinridge was elected to the U.S. House of Representatives with 56.72% of the vote, defeating Democratic-Republican Alexander Wilson.
- 1811; Breckinridge was re-elected with 58.4% of the vote, defeating Democratic-Republican Thomas L. Preston.
- 1813; Breckinridge was re-elected unopposed.
- 1815; Breckinridge was re-elected unopposed.

== Death and burial ==
Breckinridge died at his country home, "Grove Hill," Botetourt County, Virginia, May 13, 1833, and was buried in the family burial plot on his estate near Fincastle.

== Legacy ==
Since his death, Breckenridge Elementary School in Fincastle and James Breckenridge Middle School in nearby Roanoke have both been named in his honor.

U.S. House of Representatives
Preceded by Alexander Wilson	Member of the U.S. House of Representatives from Virginia's 5th congressional district 1809–1817	Succeeded by John Floyd
