= Channel Lake, Illinois =

- Census-designated place
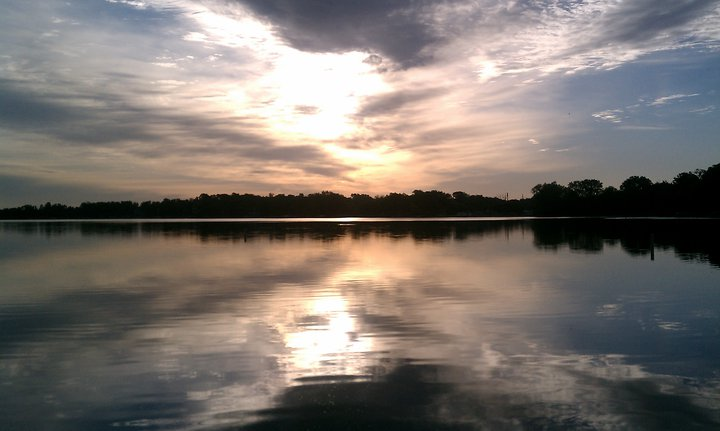
- Channel Lake

- Location in Illinois Location in the United States
- Coordinates: 42°28′57″N 88°08′56″W
- Country: United States
- State: Illinois
- County: Lake
- Township: Antioch

Area
  - Total: 2.40 sq mi (6.22 km^{2})
  - Land: 1.80 sq mi (4.67 km^{2})
  - Water: 0.60 sq mi (1.55 km^{2})
- Elevation: 751 ft (229 m)

Population (2020)
  - Total: 1,581
  - Density: 876.2/sq mi (338.32/km^{2})
- Time zone: UTC-6 (CST)
  - Summer (DST): UTC-5 (CDT)
- ZIP Code: 60002 (Antioch)
- Area code(s): 847, 224
- FIPS code: 17-12489
- GNIS feature ID: 2393373

Channel Lake is an unincorporated community and census-designated place (CDP) in Antioch Township, Lake County, Illinois, United States. Per the 2020 census, the population was 1,581.

== Geography ==
Channel Lake is located in northwestern Lake County on the northwest and southwest sides of Channel Lake, part of the Chain O'Lakes system of lakes in northern Illinois leading to the Fox River. It is bordered to the east by the community of Lake Catherine and to the north by the village of Salem Lakes, Wisconsin.

According to the 2021 census gazetteer files, Channel Lake has a total area of 2.40 square miles (6.22 km^{2}), of which 1.80 square miles (4.66 km^{2}) (or 75.10%) is land and 0.60 square miles (1.55 km^{2}) (or 24.90%) is water.

== Demographics ==
Historical population
Census	Pop.	Note	%±
2000	1,785		—
2010	1,664		−6.8%
2020	1,581		−5.0%
U.S. Decennial Census; 2010 2020

=== Racial and ethnic composition ===
Channel Lake CDP, Illinois – Racial and ethnic composition Note: the US Census treats Hispanic/Latino as an ethnic category. This table excludes Latinos from the racial categories and assigns them to a separate category. Hispanics/Latinos may be of any race.
Race / Ethnicity (NH = Non-Hispanic)	Pop 2000	Pop 2010	Pop 2020	% 2000	% 2010	% 2020
White alone (NH)	1,699	1,519	1,387	95.18%	91.29%	87.73%
Black or African American alone (NH)	4	5	6	0.22%	0.30%	0.38%
Native American or Alaska Native alone (NH)	15	4	3	0.84%	0.24%	0.19%
Asian alone (NH)	9	8	3	0.50%	0.48%	0.19%
Native Hawaiian or Pacific Islander alone (NH)	0	1	0	0.00%	0.06%	0.00%
Other race alone (NH)	10	2	1	0.56%	0.12%	0.06%
Mixed race or Multiracial (NH)	15	26	60	0.84%	1.56%	3.80%
Hispanic or Latino (any race)	33	99	121	1.85%	5.95%	7.65%
Total	1,785	1,664	1,581	100.00%	100.00%	100.00%

=== 2020 census ===
As of the 2020 census, Channel Lake had a population of 1,581. The population density was 658.20 inhabitants per square mile (254.13/km^{2}). The median age was 47.1 years. 16.7% of residents were under the age of 18 and 18.0% of residents were 65 years of age or older. For every 100 females there were 123.6 males, and for every 100 females age 18 and over there were 123.2 males age 18 and over.

88.6% of residents lived in urban areas, while 11.4% lived in rural areas.

There were 700 households in Channel Lake, of which 22.0% had children under the age of 18 living in them. Of all households, 43.9% were married-couple households, 26.6% were households with a male householder and no spouse or partner present, and 20.7% were households with a female householder and no spouse or partner present. About 30.5% of all households were made up of individuals and 10.3% had someone living alone who was 65 years of age or older.

There were 875 housing units, of which 20.0% were vacant. The homeowner vacancy rate was 2.2% and the rental vacancy rate was 7.8%. There were 452 families residing in the CDP, and housing density was 364.28 per square mile (140.65/km^{2}).

=== Income and poverty ===
The median income for a household in the CDP was $51,875, and the median income for a family was $70,667. Males had a median income of $36,848 versus $38,750 for females. The per capita income for the CDP was $33,467. About 21.7% of families and 21.1% of the population were below the poverty line, including 35.9% of those under age 18 and 2.1% of those age 65 or over.
