= Fincastle Historic District =

Historic district in Virginia, United States

- U.S. National Register of Historic Places
- U.S. Historic district
- Virginia Landmarks Register
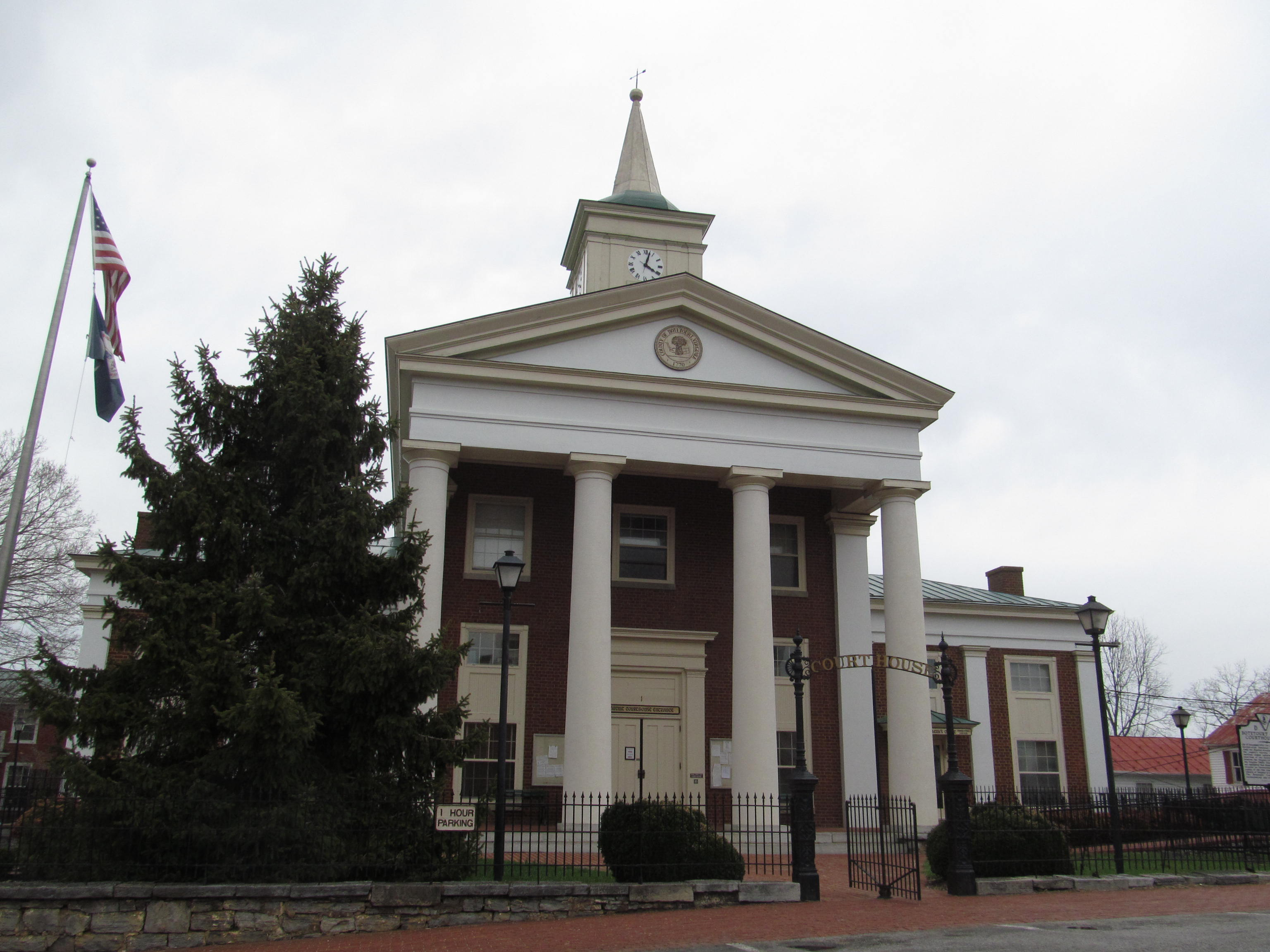
- Botetourt County Courthouse

- Location within Virginia Location within the United States
- Location: Roughly bounded by Carper, Hancock, Catawba, and Back Sts., and Griffin Alley, Fincastle, Virginia
- Coordinates: 37°29′55″N 79°52′34″W
- Area: 85 acres (34 ha)
- Built: 1770
- Architectural style: Late Victorian, Greek Revival, Gothic Revival
- NRHP reference No.: 69000224
- VLR No.: 218-0051

Significant dates
- Added to NRHP: November 12, 1969, November 23, 2012 (Additional Documentation)
- Designated VLR: May 13, 1969

Fincastle Historic District is a national historic district located at Fincastle, Botetourt County, Virginia. It encompasses nine contributing buildings in the central business district of Fincastle. The district resources portray an excellent example of a typical small 19th century town. The buildings include examples of Late Victorian, Greek Revival, and Gothic Revival styles. Notable buildings include the Botetourt County Courthouse (1845, rebuilt 1970) and jail, Methodist Church, Presbyterian Church, St. Mark's Episcopal Church (1837), the Peck House, Selander House (c. 1800), Ammen House (c. 1826), and Kyle House (1832).

It was listed on the National Register of Historic Places in 1969.
