= 1799 Virginia gubernatorial election =

- December 6, 1799
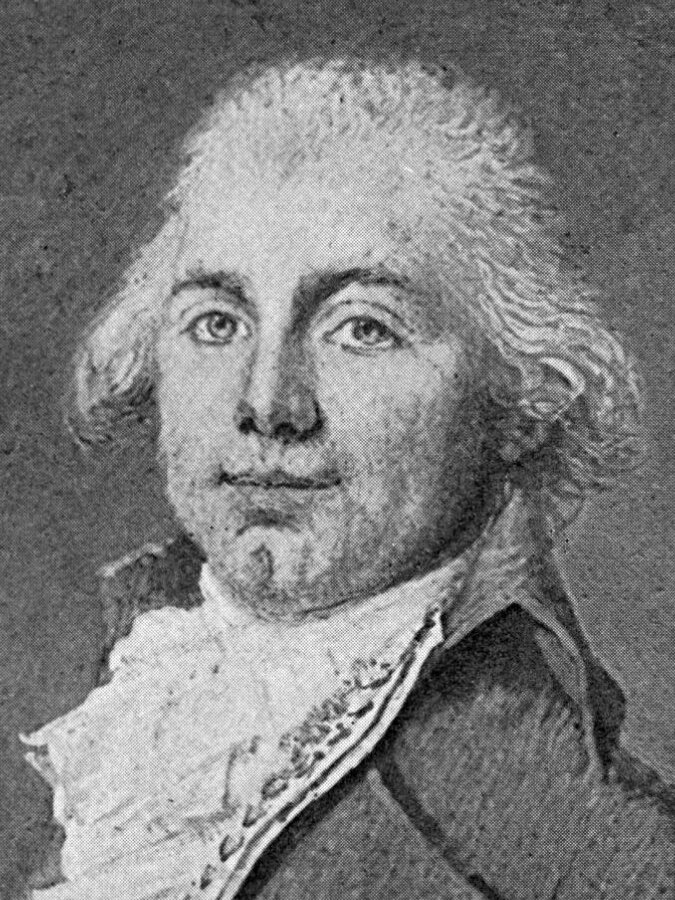

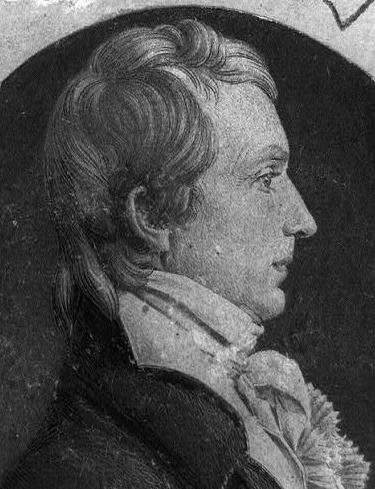
Nominee	James Monroe	James Breckinridge
Party	Democratic-Republican	Federalist
1st ballot	101	66
Governor before election
James Wood
Democratic-Republican
Elected Governor
James Monroe
Democratic-Republican

A gubernatorial election was held in Virginia on December 6, 1799. The Democratic-Republican former U.S. minister to France James Monroe defeated the Federalist member of the Virginia House of Delegates from Botetourt County James Breckinridge.

Monroe had been a possible candidate for governor in 1797, but declined to challenge the incumbent governor of Virginia James Wood. With Wood ineligible for re-election due to term limits established by the Constitution of Virginia, the state's Democratic-Republican leaders nominated Monroe to succeed the retiring incumbent. The nomination was a public vote of confidence in Monroe, who was known for his strong opposition to the national Adams Administration and the hated Alien and Sedition Acts. Democratic-Republicans were equally interested in the significance of the gubernatorial race for the 1800 United States presidential election in Virginia. As governor, Monroe, a close ally of Thomas Jefferson, would be positioned to promote the success of the Democratic-Republican national ticket and ensure friendly administration of the election. The election attracted little comment from the press, despite Federalist efforts to disparage Monroe's diplomatic record. The support of the Democratic-Republican leaders in the highly-partisan, elite-led political culture of eighteenth century Virginia made Monroe's election a forgone conclusion.

The election was conducted by the Virginia General Assembly in joint session. Monroe was elected with a majority on the first ballot.

== General election ==
1799 Virginia gubernatorial election
Party	Candidate	First ballot	
Party	Candidate	Count	Percent
Democratic-Republican	James Monroe	101	59.41
Federalist	James Breckinridge	66	38.82
Democratic-Republican	James Madison	2	1.18
Democratic-Republican	Archibald Stuart	1	0.59
Total		170	100.00

== Bibliography ==
- Ammon, Harry (1971). James Monroe: The Quest for National Identity. New York: McGraw Hill Book Company.
- Lampi, Philip J. (2012). "Virginia 1799 Governor". A New Nation Votes. American Antiquarian Society.
- Sobel, Robert; Raimo, John (1978). Biographical Directory of the Governors of the United States 1789–1978. Vol. 4. Westport, CT: Meckler Books.
