= Lakes Community High School =

Location
- 1600 Eagle Way Drive; Lake Villa, Illinois 60046; United States
- 42°26′36.6″N 88°3′35″W

Information
- Type: Public high school
- Motto: Respect + Courtesy = Pride
- Established: 2004; 22 years ago
- Sister school: Antioch Community High School
- School district: Community High School District 117
- NCES School ID: 170387005622
- Dean: Curt Onstad, Kurt Rowells
- Principal: Jori Bowen
- Teaching staff: 85.50 (FTE)
- Grades: 9–12
- Enrollment: 1,334 (2024–2025)
- Student to teacher ratio: 15.60
- Campus: Suburban
- Colors: Royal Blue; White; Red
- Mascot: Ozzy Eagle
- Newspaper: Talon Times
- Website: www.chsd117.org/o/lakes-high-school

Lakes Community High School, or LCHS, is a public four-year high school located in Lake Villa, Illinois, a northern suburb of Chicago, Illinois, in the United States. It is part of Community High School District 117, which also includes Antioch Community High School.

== History ==
Lakes Community High School opened to 600 freshman and sophomore students on August 23, 2004.

Voters approved the bond referendum to construct a second high school for District 117 in 2000. Construction began in 2001 on both the high school and the Antioch-Lake Villa Township Center, which contains offices and meeting space for district operations. Work continued on schedule and under budget until the school's completion in August 2004.

In the spring of 2003, the board of education selected the school's name, mascot (Eagles) and colors (royal blue, white, red) from suggestions made by community members. At the same time, the district changed its name to Community High School District 117.

Attendance boundaries were determined in April 2003. Students living in the 60046 ZIP code would attend Lakes, as well as those living in homes nearby. Initially all District 117 freshmen were to attend Lakes for 2004–2005, but in December 2003 the board of education revised the plan, keeping all students at the high schools they would eventually graduate from. The class of 2007 was the only class to be split when Lakes opened.

Summer school classes were held at Lakes during June and July 2004, and Gavin grade school students made use of classrooms in the southernmost wing for 15 months starting in the spring of 2004.

Formal dedication ceremonies were held on June 12, 2004. While operating as a separate high school, Lakes shared its athletic program with Antioch Community High School during its first year. Lakes became a member of the North Suburban Conference - Prairie Division in the fall of 2005 and competed on its own with a full complement of varsity and sub-varsity teams.

== Notable alumni ==
- T. J. Edwards (born 1996), American Football Player for Chicago Bears
- Kyle Rittenhouse (born 2003), accused of the Kenosha unrest shooting, attended for one term from 2017-18 before dropping out
- D. J. Snelten (born 1992), professional baseball player
