= Breckinridge Mill =

Historic former gristmill in Virginia, US

- U.S. National Register of Historic Places
- Virginia Landmarks Register
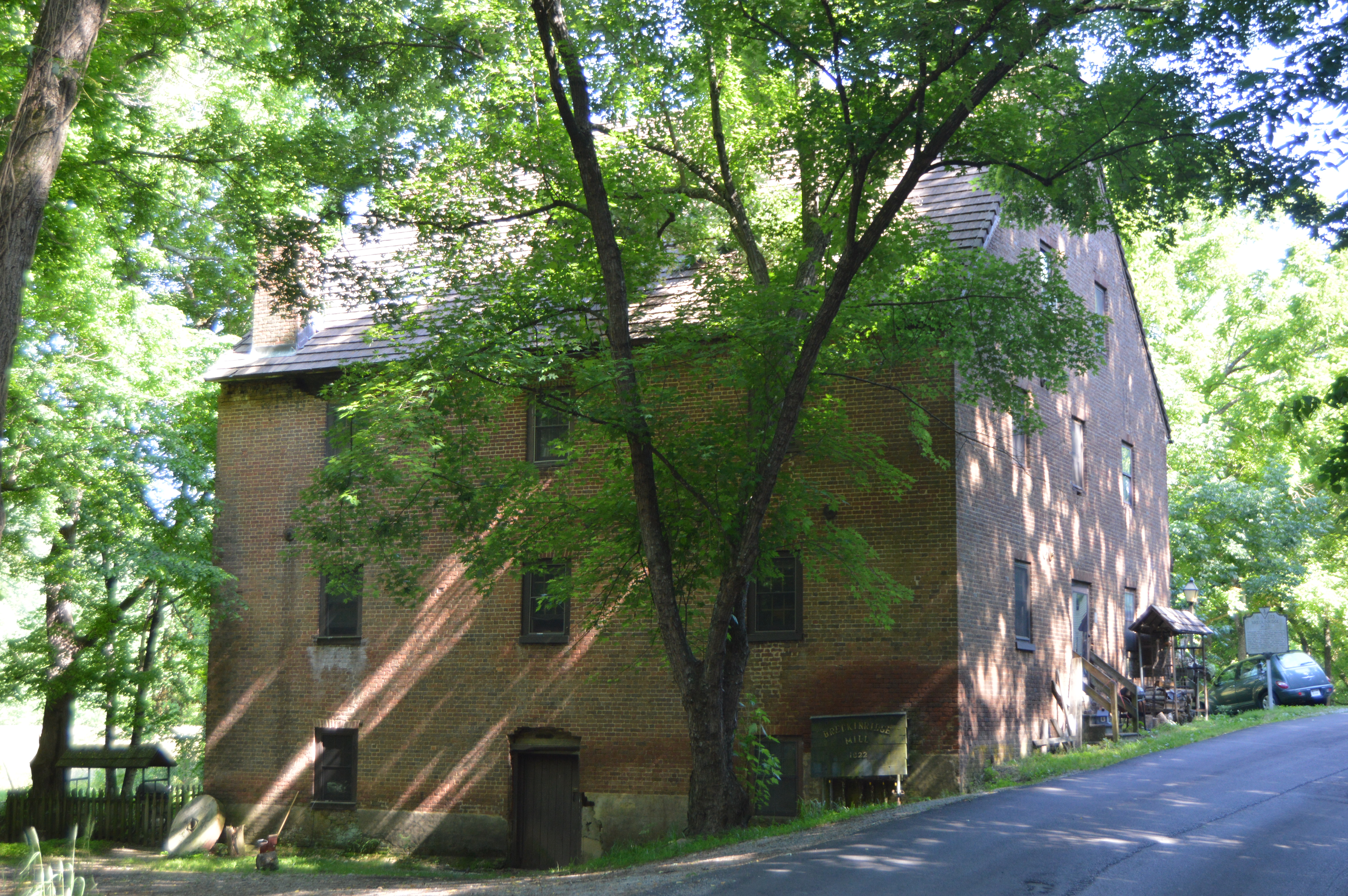
- Northern side

- Location within Virginia Location within the United States
- Location: W of Fincastle on VA 600, 7850 Breckinridge Mill Rd., near Fincastle, Virginia
- Coordinates: 37°29′55″N 79°54′40″W
- Area: 4.4 acres (1.8 ha)
- Built: 1822, 1900
- Architectural style: Queen Anne
- NRHP reference No.: 80004172, 02000588 (Boundary Increase)
- VLR No.: 011-0187

Significant dates
- Added to NRHP: July 30, 1980, May 30, 2002 (Boundary Increase)
- Designated VLR: May 20, 1980, March 17, 1999

Breckinridge Mill, also known as Howell's Mill and Breckinridge Mill Complex, is a historic grist mill complex located near Fincastle, Botetourt County, Virginia. The mill was built about 1822, and is a 3 1/2-story, brick structure. The mill was converted to apartments in 1977. Associated with the mill are two contributing wood-frame, late 19th-century sheds. Also associated with the mill is the miller's or Howell house. It was built about 1900, and is a two-story, Queen Anne style frame structure with a T-plan and gabled roof. The mill was built for James Breckinridge (1763-1833) and replaced an earlier mill erected by him in 1804.

It was listed on the National Register of Historic Places in 1980, with a boundary increase in 2002.
