= Lone Tree School =

- U.S. National Register of Historic Places
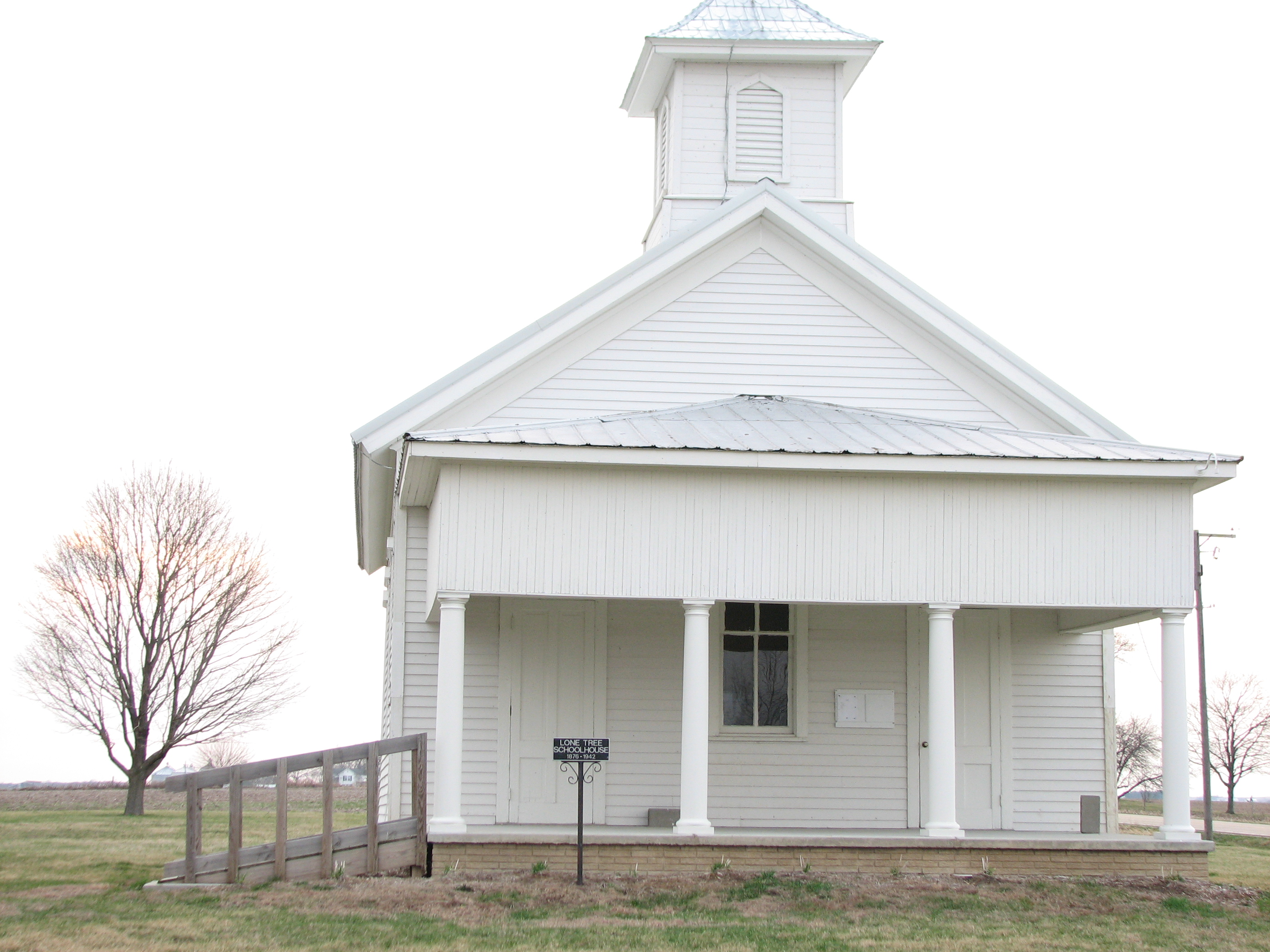

- Location within Illinois Location within the United States
- Nearest city: Tiskilwa, Illinois
- Coordinates: 41°11′11″N 89°29′11″W
- Area: less than one acre
- Built: 1876
- Architectural style: One-room school
- NRHP reference No.: 04000418
- Added to NRHP: May 12, 2004

The Lone Tree School is a historic one-room schoolhouse located at 19292 250 North Avenue in rural Bureau County, Illinois. The school was built in 1876 to serve the community of Lone Tree and surrounding Wheatland Township. It was one of three schools in the township, and served school district #3; the district was established in 1848, but the location of its first school is unknown. It continued to serve the area until 1942, when it closed due to school consolidations in the county; the school outlasted the community it served, as Lone Tree was otherwise abandoned by the 1920s. Though Bureau County once had 236 one-room schoolhouses, Lone Tree School is one of the few which is well-preserved and still at its original location.

The school was added to the National Register of Historic Places on May 12, 2004.
