= Munjor, Kansas =

Unincorporated community in Ellis County, Kansas, United States

- Unincorporated community and CDP
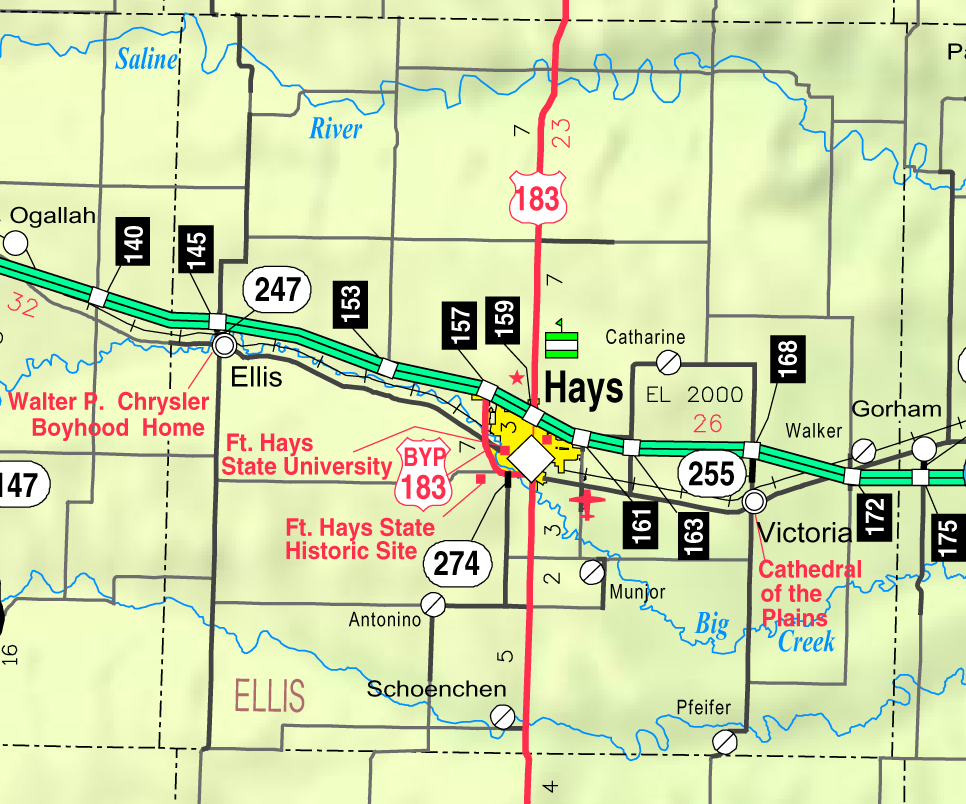
- KDOT map of Ellis County (legend)

- Location within Kansas Location within the United States
- Coordinates: 38°48′40″N 99°15′53″W
- Country: United States
- State: Kansas
- County: Ellis
- Founded: 1876

Area
  - Total: 2.31 sq mi (5.97 km^{2})
  - Land: 2.31 sq mi (5.97 km^{2})
  - Water: 0 sq mi (0.0 km^{2})
- Elevation: 1,942 ft (592 m)

Population (2020)
  - Total: 232
  - Density: 101/sq mi (38.9/km^{2})
- Time zone: UTC-6 (CST)
  - Summer (DST): UTC-5 (CDT)
- ZIP Code: 67601
- Area code: 785
- FIPS code: 20-49200
- GNIS ID: 2629166

Munjor is an unincorporated community and census-designated place (CDP) in Wheatland Township, Ellis County, Kansas, United States. As of the 2020 census, the population was 232.

== History ==
The Munjor community was one of six settlements founded in 1876 by Volga German immigrants from Russia. Their German ancestors had immigrated to the Volga Region of Russia around 1767 at the invitation of Catherine the Great in 1763. Catherine invited the German people to Russia to develop the vast steppes and promised them land, freedom from military conscription and religious freedom. By about 1870 these privileges were at risk. Because of impending military conscription and loss of religious freedom, the communities of German settlers along the Volga River elected five men to act as scouts to inspect the prospects of life in America. Peter Leiker (of Obermonjou), Peter Stecklien (of Zug), Anton Wasinger (of Schönchen), Nicholas Schamme (of Graf), and Jacob Ritter (of Luzern) left from Obermonjou, Russia in 1874, landed in New York City and traveled westward as far as Nebraska. They found the prospects of life in America and the farmland of Nebraska favorable and returned to Russia with their report. Encouraged by the accounts of these men, a group of colonists left Russia in 1875 and landed in Baltimore on November 23, 1875. They traveled westward, spending the winter in Topeka, Kansas and then moved on to settle in Ellis County in the spring of 1876.

Other groups followed in the spring and summer months of 1876. The largest group was composed of 108 families which left from Saratov on July 8, 1876. The group divided into two parts for ocean transportation, the larger part coming on the North-German Lloyd Line, and the rest by way of the Hamburg-American Line. In this latter group were the founders of Munjor, including three of the original scouts: Peter Leiker, Anton Wasinger, and Peter Stecklein. After landing in New York August 3, they immediately headed westward traveling to Topeka and then to Herzog, Kansas, and within a few days moved to a tract of land along Big Creek and after 2 months moved to Section 25, Range 18 in Wheatland Township which is now Munjor, Kansas. Other immigrant groups arrived in Munjor in November 1876, September 1877, and July 1878.

The immigrants referred to their settlement as Obermonjou, and oftentimes had difficulty with reading and writing in English, and their German pronunciation of many words provided the only guide English speaking civil authorities had to create legal documents. It is because of these types of translation errors that Munjor had six different spellings at various times: Obermonchu, Over Mancha, Obermonjour, Over Muncha, Offermoncha and Monjor. Sometime around 1880 to 1882, the name Munjor was finally accepted by the settlers as a shortened practical version of native Obermonjou. The origins for the name of the town of Munjor go back to the German people who established villages along the Volga River in Russia around 1764 to 1768. When the Germans left their homeland to settle along the Volga River, they were divided into groups of 100 families and was given a leader. Two German speaking Frenchmen with the last name of Monjou became the leaders of two of the groups. The older, Major Otto Friedrich de Monjou, became the leader of a Catholic group which settled along the Volga, north of Saratov. The younger Monjou established a colony of Lutherans further south. Both villages were named Monjou, which caused confusion and resulted in the Russian civil authorities to name the northern colony Obermonjou and the southern colony Neidermonjou.

== Geography ==
Munjor lies on the southwestern side of Big Creek, a tributary of the Smoky Hill River, in the Smoky Hills region of the Great Plains. Munjor is roughly 4.5 miles (7.2 km) south of Interstate 70, 3 miles (4.8 km) east of U.S. Route 183 and 5 miles (8.0 km) southeast of Hays, the county seat.

== Demographics ==
Historical population
| Census | Pop. | Note | %± |
|---|---|---|---|
| 2010 | 213 | | — |
| 2020 | 232 | | 8.9% |
U.S. Decennial Census

The 2020 United States census counted 232 people, 110 households, and 79 families in Munjor. The population density was 100.7 per square mile (38.9/km^{2}). There were 113 housing units at an average density of 49.0 per square mile (18.9/km^{2}). The racial makeup was 89.22% (207) white or European American (87.93% non-Hispanic white), 0.86% (2) black or African-American, 0.86% (2) Native American or Alaska Native, 0.0% (0) Asian, 0.0% (0) Pacific Islander or Native Hawaiian, 4.74% (11) from other races, and 4.31% (10) from two or more races. Hispanic or Latino of any race was 10.78% (25) of the population.

Of the 110 households, 22.7% had children under the age of 18; 50.9% were married couples living together; 16.4% had a female householder with no spouse or partner present. 21.8% of households consisted of individuals and 8.2% had someone living alone who was 65 years of age or older. The average household size was 1.4 and the average family size was 1.6. The percent of those with a bachelor's degree or higher was estimated to be 3.0% of the population.

24.6% of the population was under the age of 18, 1.7% from 18 to 24, 24.1% from 25 to 44, 28.9% from 45 to 64, and 20.7% who were 65 years of age or older. The median age was 43.0 years. For every 100 females, there were 71.9 males. For every 100 females ages 18 and older, there were 66.7 males.

=== 2010 census ===
As of the 2010 census, there were 213 people, 99 households, and 66 families residing in the community. There were 112 housing units. The racial makeup of the community was 98.1% White and 1.9% from some other race. Hispanics or Latinos of any race were 2.3% of the population.

There were 99 households, out of which 21.2% had children under the age of 18 living with them, 49.5% were married couples living together, 7.1% had a male householder with no wife present, 10.1% had a female householder with no husband present, and 33.3% were non-families. 28.3% of all households were made up of individuals, and 8.0% had someone living alone who was 65 years of age or older. The average household size was 2.15, and the average family size was 2.59.

In the community, the population was spread out, with 17.4% under the age of 18, 7.3% from 18 to 24, 22.1% from 25 to 44, 33.5% from 45 to 64, and 19.7% who were 65 years of age or older. The median age was 46.8 years. For every 100 females, there were 100.1 males. For every 100 females age 18 and over, there were 112.1 males age 18 and over.

== Education ==
The community is served by Hays USD 489 public school district.
