= Prospect Hill (Fincastle, Virginia) =

Historic house in Virginia, United States

- U.S. National Register of Historic Places
- Virginia Landmarks Register
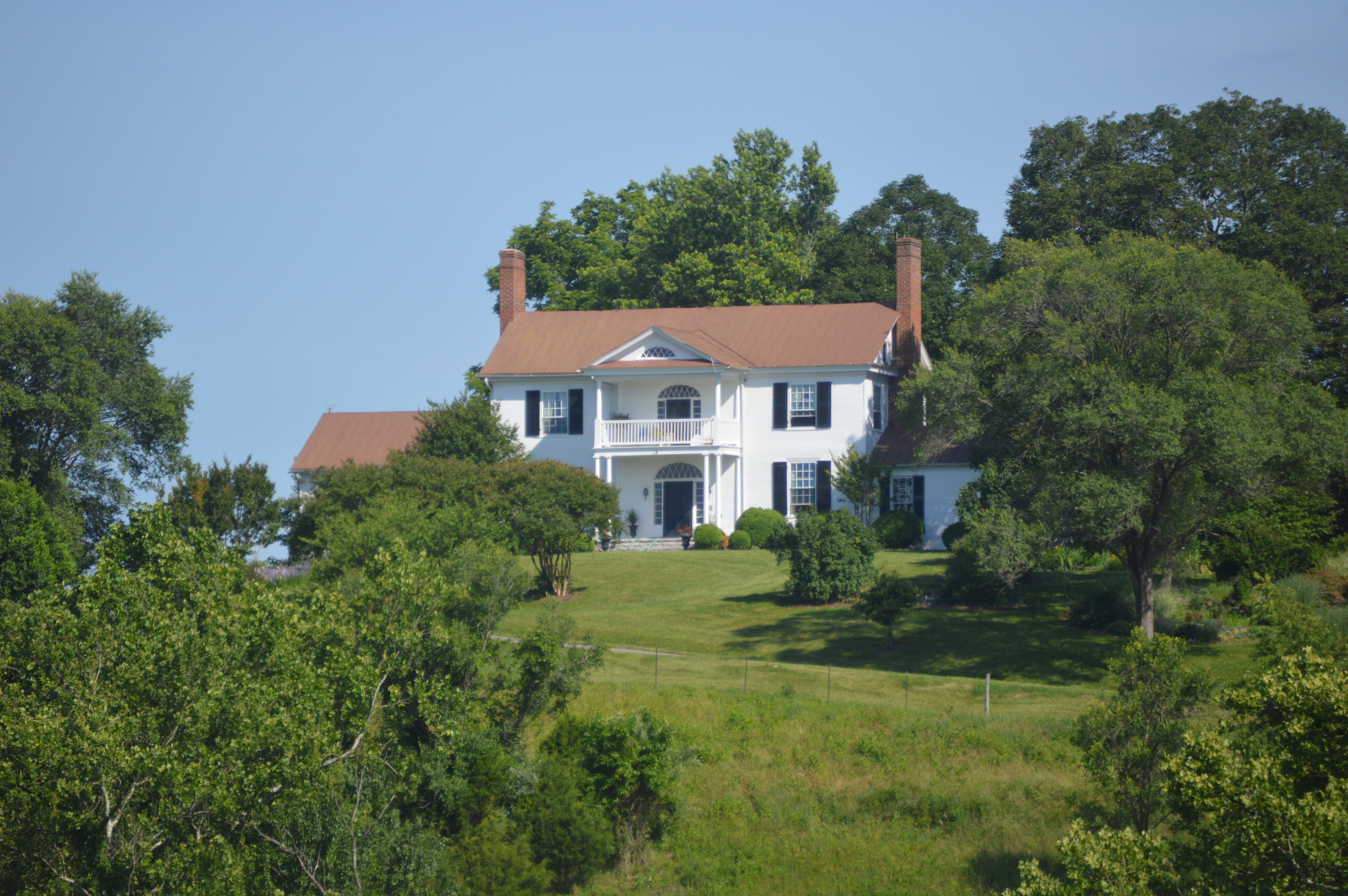
- Distant view from the west

- Location within Virginia Location within the United States
- Location: Off VA 606, near Fincastle, Virginia
- Coordinates: 37°29′30″N 79°52′22″W
- Area: 11 acres (4.5 ha)
- Built: 1837-1838
- Architectural style: Federal
- NRHP reference No.: 79003031
- VLR No.: 011-0185

Significant dates
- Added to NRHP: December 28, 1979
- Designated VLR: December 1, 1999

Prospect Hill, also known as Prospect and Gray's Folly, is a historic home near Fincastle, Botetourt County, Virginia. Built in 1837–1838, it is a 2 1/2-story, single-pile, wood frame I-house dwelling in the Federal style, with a one-story brick kitchen wing. It is sheathed in flush boarding and covered by a pedimented gable roof. The front facade features a two-level pedimented portico on slender Tuscan order columns.

It was listed on the National Register of Historic Places in 1979.
