= Wheatland Township =

Wheatland Township may refer to:

== Illinois ==
- Wheatland Township, Bureau County, Illinois
- Wheatland Township, Fayette County, Illinois
- Wheatland Township, Will County, Illinois

== Iowa ==
- Wheatland Township, Carroll County, Iowa

== Kansas ==
- Wheatland Township, Barton County, Kansas
- Wheatland Township, Dickinson County, Kansas
- Wheatland Township, Ellis County, Kansas
- Wheatland Township, Ford County, Kansas

== Michigan ==
- Wheatland Township, Hillsdale County, Michigan
- Wheatland Township, Mecosta County, Michigan
- Wheatland Township, Sanilac County, Michigan

== Minnesota ==
- Wheatland Township, Rice County, Minnesota

== Missouri ==
- Wheatland Township, Hickory County, Missouri

== North Dakota ==
- Wheatland Township, Cass County, North Dakota, in Cass County, North Dakota

== South Dakota ==
- Wheatland Township, Day County, South Dakota, in Day County, South Dakota

== See also ==
- Wheatland (disambiguation)
