= Hawthorne Hall =

Historic house in Virginia, United States

- U.S. National Register of Historic Places
- Virginia Landmarks Register
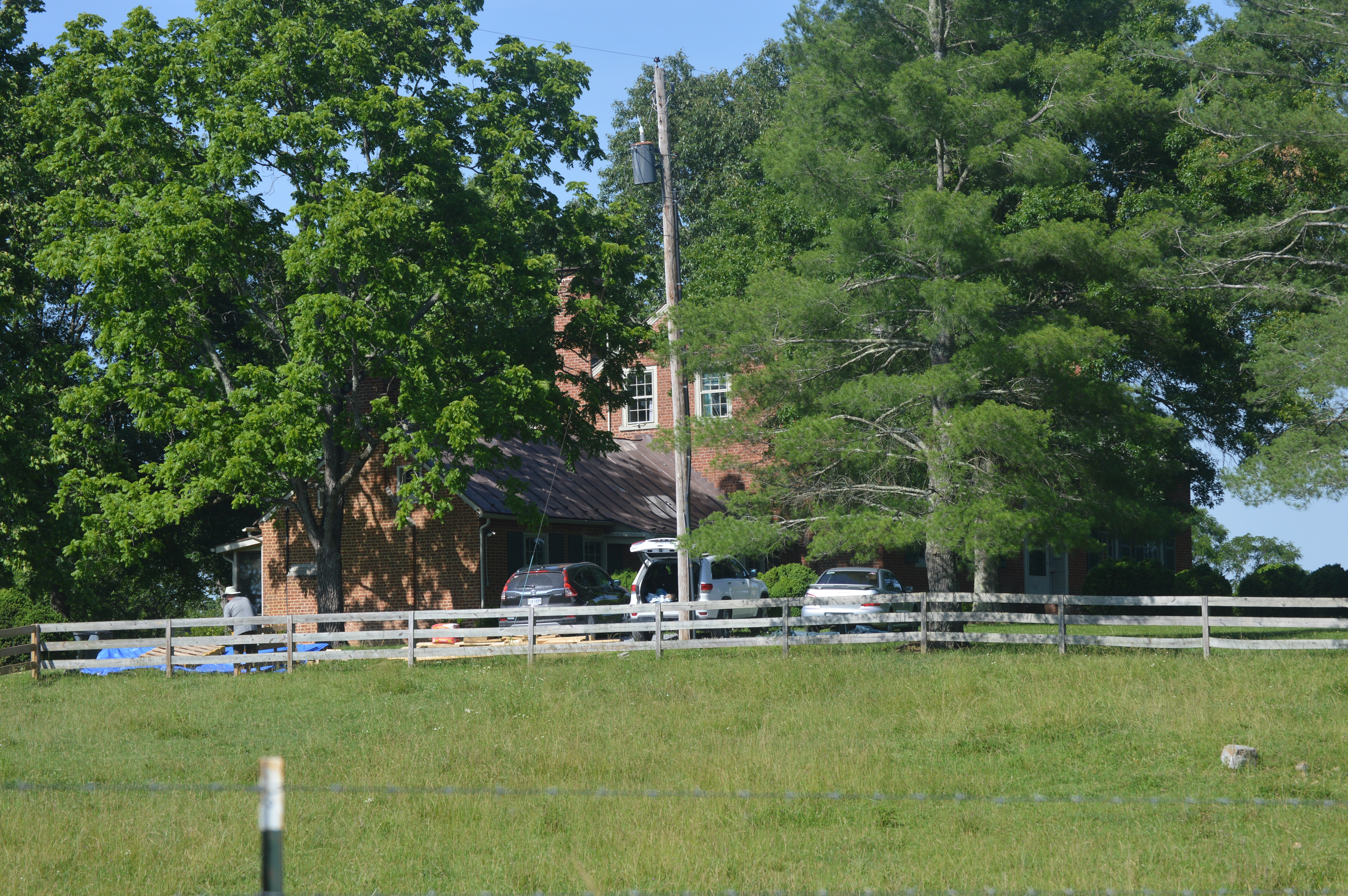
- Distant view from southwest

- Location within Virginia Location within the United States
- Location: 1527 Hawthorne Hall Rd., Fincastle, Virginia
- Coordinates: 37°31′30″N 79°53′31″W
- Area: 1.2 acres (0.49 ha)
- Built: 1824
- Architectural style: Federal
- NRHP reference No.: 00000025
- VLR No.: 011-0037

Significant dates
- Added to NRHP: January 28, 2000
- Designated VLR: December 1, 1999

Hawthorne Hall is a historic home located at Fincastle, Botetourt County, Virginia. It was built in 1824, and consists of a 1 1/2-story, double-pile, center passage-plan brick main block with Federal detailing, with a one-story brick kitchen wing. It was restored in the 1970s.

It was listed on the National Register of Historic Places in 2000.
