= Wiloma =

Historic house in Virginia, United States

- U.S. National Register of Historic Places
- Virginia Landmarks Register
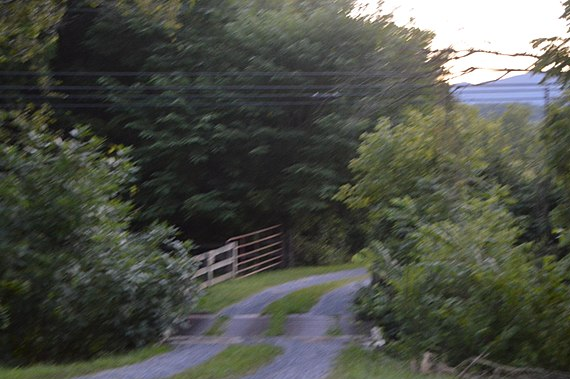
- Property entrance from U.S. Route 220

- Location within Virginia Location within the United States
- Location: Off US 220, near Fincastle, Virginia
- Coordinates: 37°30′53″N 79°53′20″W
- Area: 40 acres (16 ha)
- Built: 1848, 1888
- Architectural style: Greek Revival
- NRHP reference No.: 85002913
- VLR No.: 011-0039

Significant dates
- Added to NRHP: November 22, 1985
- Designated VLR: October 18, 1983

Wiloma is a historic home near Fincastle, Botetourt County, Virginia. It was built in 1848, and is a two-story, brick I-house dwelling with Greek Revival style detailing. It has a two-level pedimented porch on the south and a long two-story wing with a two-level porch completed in 1888.

It was listed on the National Register of Historic Places in 1985.
