= Lake Catherine, Illinois =

- Census-designated place
- Location in Illinois Location in the United States
- Coordinates: 42°29′15″N 88°07′26″W
- Country: United States
- State: Illinois
- County: Lake
- Township: Antioch

Area
  - Total: 1.45 sq mi (3.76 km^{2})
  - Land: 0.91 sq mi (2.35 km^{2})
  - Water: 0.54 sq mi (1.41 km^{2})
- Elevation: 735 ft (224 m)

Population (2020)
  - Total: 1,279
  - Density: 1,407.2/sq mi (543.34/km^{2})
- Time zone: UTC-6 (CST)
  - Summer (DST): UTC-5 (CDT)
- FIPS code: 17-40988
- GNIS feature ID: 2396003

Lake Catherine is an unincorporated community and census-designated place (CDP) in Lake County, Illinois, United States. Per the 2020 census, the population was 1,279.

== Geography ==
Lake Catherine is located in northwestern Lake County and is bordered to the north by Kenosha County, Wisconsin, to the east by the village of Antioch, and to the west by the community of Channel Lake. It surrounds Lake Catherine, a bay of Channel Lake, one of the Chain O'Lakes of northern Illinois.

Illinois Route 173 passes through the community, leading east through Antioch village 16 miles (26 km) to Zion and west 9 miles (14 km) to Richmond. Chicago is 55 miles (89 km) to the southeast, and Kenosha, Wisconsin, is 20 miles (32 km) to the northeast.

According to the 2021 census gazetteer files, Lake Catherine has a total area of 1.45 square miles (3.76 km^{2}), of which 0.91 square miles (2.36 km^{2}) (or 62.56%) is land and 0.54 square miles (1.40 km^{2}) (or 37.44%) is water.

== Demographics ==
Historical population
Census	Pop.	Note	%±
2000	1,490		—
2010	1,379		−7.4%
2020	1,279		−7.3%
U.S. Decennial Census; 2010 2020

=== Racial and ethnic composition ===
Lake Catherine CDP, Illinois – Racial and ethnic composition Note: the US Census treats Hispanic/Latino as an ethnic category. This table excludes Latinos from the racial categories and assigns them to a separate category. Hispanics/Latinos may be of any race.
Race / Ethnicity (NH = Non-Hispanic)	Pop 2000	Pop 2010	Pop 2020	% 2000	% 2010	% 2020
White alone (NH)	1,426	1,269	1,124	95.70%	92.02%	87.88%
Black or African American alone (NH)	12	20	12	0.81%	1.45%	0.94%
Native American or Alaska Native alone (NH)	1	3	5	0.07%	0.22%	0.39%
Asian alone (NH)	0	7	9	0.00%	0.51%	0.70%
Native Hawaiian or Pacific Islander alone (NH)	0	0	0	0.00%	0.00%	0.00%
Other race alone (NH)	3	1	0	0.20%	0.07%	0.00%
Mixed race or Multiracial (NH)	14	19	44	0.94%	1.38%	3.44%
Hispanic or Latino (any race)	34	60	85	2.28%	4.35%	6.65%
Total	1,490	1,379	1,279	100.00%	100.00%	100.00%

=== 2020 census ===
As of the 2020 census, Lake Catherine had a population of 1,279. The population density was 880.25 inhabitants per square mile (339.87/km^{2}). The median age was 48.3 years. 18.2% of residents were under the age of 18 and 21.2% of residents were 65 years of age or older. For every 100 females there were 100.5 males, and for every 100 females age 18 and over there were 99.6 males age 18 and over.

100.0% of residents lived in urban areas, while 0.0% lived in rural areas.

There were 578 households and 313 families in Lake Catherine, of which 19.9% had children under the age of 18 living in them. Of all households, 42.0% were married-couple households, 30.4% were households with a male householder and no spouse or partner present, and 18.9% were households with a female householder and no spouse or partner present. About 34.2% of all households were made up of individuals and 17.3% had someone living alone who was 65 years of age or older. The average household size was 3.06 and the average family size was 2.29.

There were 743 housing units at an average density of 511.36 per square mile (197.44/km^{2}). Of all housing units, 22.2% were vacant. The homeowner vacancy rate was 2.8% and the rental vacancy rate was 9.6%.

=== Income and poverty ===
The median income for a household in the CDP was $78,889, and the median income for a family was $94,792. Males had a median income of $46,094 versus $27,072 for females. The per capita income for the CDP was $39,950. About 1.9% of families and 2.2% of the population were below the poverty line, including 0.0% of those under age 18 and 0.3% of those age 65 or over.
