= Wheatland =

Wheatland or Wheatlands may refer to:

== Places ==
=== Canada ===
- Wheatland County, Alberta
- Rural Municipality of Wheatlands No. 163, Saskatchewan

=== Scotland ===
- Wheatlands, an area of Blantyre, South Lanarkshire

=== United States ===
- Wheatland, California
- Wheatland, Indiana
- Wheatland, Iowa
- Wheatland, Michigan
- Wheatland, Minnesota
- Wheatland, Missouri
- Wheatland, Montana
- Wheatland County, Montana
- Wheatland, New Mexico
- Wheatland, New York
- Wheatland, North Dakota
- Wheatland, Oklahoma
- Wheatland, Oregon
- Wheatland, Pennsylvania
- Wheatland, Kenosha County, Wisconsin
- Wheatland, Vernon County, Wisconsin
- Wheatland, Wyoming

==== Historic sites ====
- Wheatland (James Buchanan House), former residence of President James Buchanan near Lancaster, Pennsylvania
- Wheatlands (Sevierville, Tennessee), listed on the NRHP in Tennessee
- Wheatland (Callao, Virginia), listed on the NRHP in Virginia
- Wheatland Manor, Fincastle, Virginia, listed on the NRHP in Virginia
- Wheatland (Loretto, Virginia), listed on the NRHP in Virginia

== Other uses ==
- The Wheatland Music Festival, held in Michigan the weekend after Labor Day each year

== See also ==
- Wheatland Township (disambiguation)
- South Wheatland Township, Macon County, Illinois
