= Lake Villa Community Consolidated School District 41 =

School district in Illinois, United States

Address
- 131 McKinley Avenue Lake Villa, Illinois, 60046; United States

District information
- Motto: Achieving excellence takes everyone
- Grades: PreK-8
- Superintendent: Sandra Keim-Bounds

Other information
- Website: Official website

Lake Villa Community Consolidated School District 41 is a school district based in Lake Villa, Lake County, Illinois. District 41 governs four schools in total: three elementary schools (B. J. Hooper Elementary School, Olive C. Martin Elementary School, and William L. Thompson Elementary School) and one middle school (Peter J. Palombi Middle School). The superintendent of Lake Villa School District 41 is Sandra Keim-Bounds.
