= Wheatland Manor =

Historic house in Virginia, United States

- U.S. National Register of Historic Places
- Virginia Landmarks Register
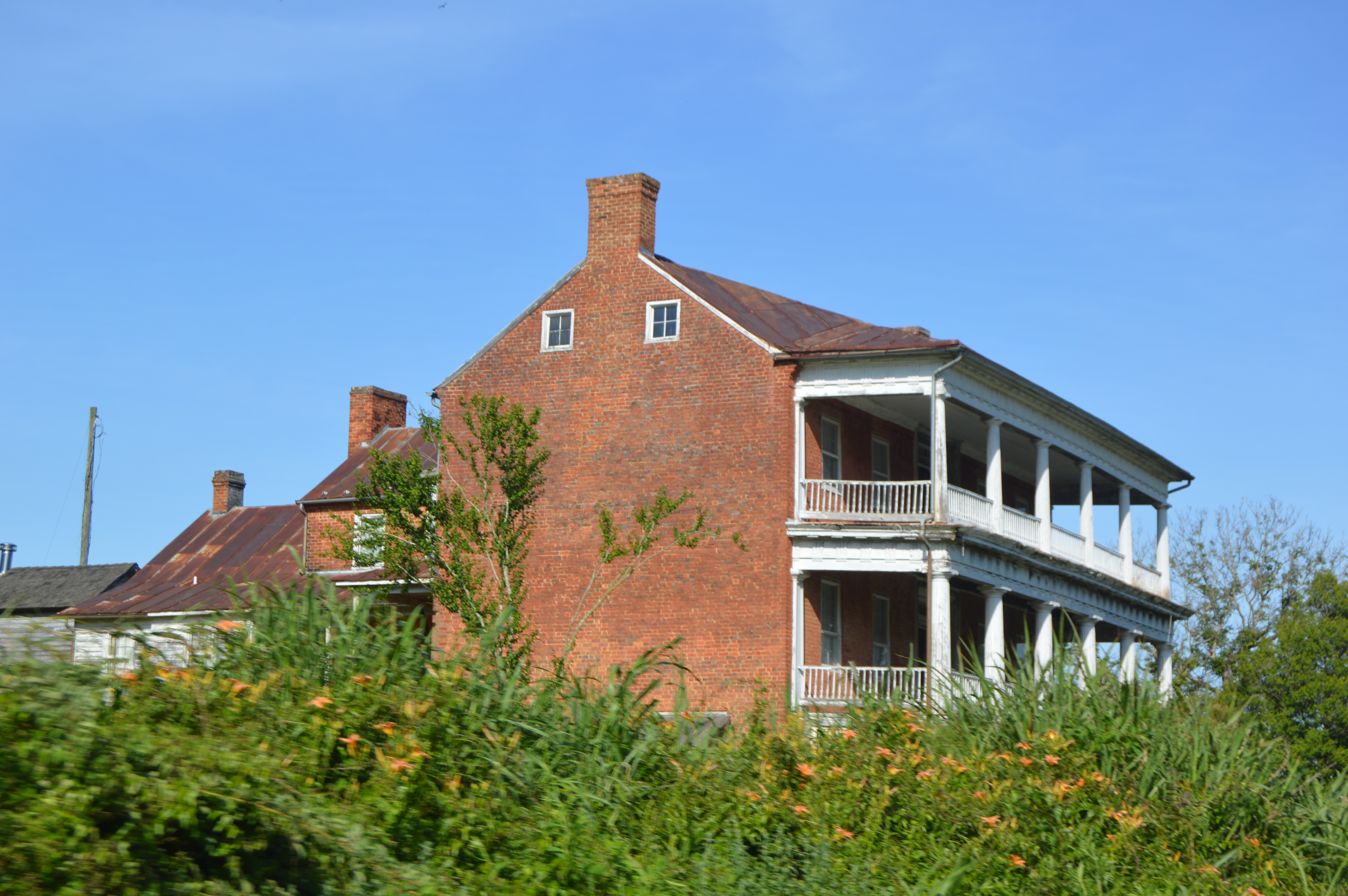
- Western side and front

- Location within Virginia Location within the United States
- Location: N side VA 639¼ mi. SE of jct. with VA 638, near Fincastle, Virginia
- Coordinates: 37°30′16″N 79°48′23″W
- Area: 4 acres (1.6 ha)
- Built: c. 1820, c. 1850
- Built by: English, Michael
- Architectural style: Greek Revival, Federal
- NRHP reference No.: 91002040
- VLR No.: 011-0038

Significant dates
- Added to NRHP: February 5, 1992
- Designated VLR: October 8, 1991

Wheatland Manor is a historic home located near Fincastle, Botetourt County, Virginia. Built circa 1820, it is a two-story, five-bay, brick, center passage plan I-house dwelling with interior Federal-style detailing. It has a two-level Greek Revival-style porch and two-story brick ell dated to the 1850s. Attached to the ell is a one-story frame kitchen wing. Also on the property are a contributing retaining wall, site of a terraced garden, ruins of an ice house, and foundation.

It was listed on the National Register of Historic Places in 1992.
