= Emmons School District 33 =

School district in Lake County, Illinois

- 24226 West Beach Grove Road Antioch, Illinois, 60002

District information
- Grades: K-8
- Superintendent/Principal: Dr. Janean Friedman
- Schools: Emmons School

Other information
- Website: Official website

Emmons School District 33 is a K-8 school district located in the central region of the village Antioch, which is located in Lake County, Illinois. There is one school located in Emmons School District 33, which serves all grades from kindergarten to eight, and encompasses a kindergarten program: it is known as Emmons Grade School, alternatively known as Emmons Elementary School or simply Emmons School. The principal/superintendent as of September 2019 is Dr. Janean Friedman; the mascot of the school and district is the raider.
