= Antioch Community High School =

Coordinates: 42°28′20″N 88°05′33″W

- Logo since the 1970s created by John O'Hara

Location
- 1133 Main Street; Antioch, Illinois; United States

Information
- Type: Public secondary
- Established: 1915
- School district: Community High School District 117
- Principal: Michael Berrie
- Teaching staff: 91.20 (FTE)
- Grades: 9–12
- Enrollment: 1,313 (2024–2025)
- Student to teacher ratio: 14.40
- Campus: Suburban
- Colors: Cardinal & grey
- Mascot: Super Fan Stan, The Sequoit Man
- Nickname: Sequoits
- Rival: Lakes Community High School
- Newspaper: The Tom Tom
- Yearbook: Sequoia
- Website: www.chsd117.org/o/antioch-high-school

Antioch Community High School, Antioch, or ACHS, is a public four-year high school in Antioch, Illinois, a far north suburb of Chicago, Illinois, in the United States. It is part of Community High School District 117, including Lakes Community High School, a school that opened its doors and formed the district in 2004.

== History ==
ACHS was built in 1915 at 1133 Main Street and has remained since then. Though the original building was renovated in the late 1990s to make room for new facilities, it has undergone numerous additions and a name change throughout its history. ACHS was originally named Antioch Township High School when it was founded in 1915. In February 1926, voters approved $65,000 to build a two-story north wing of the existing high school, which served 184 students then. In 1953, the school was again improved with a new wing expanding further north. The old gym was converted into an auditorium large enough to hold the 382 students enrolled at the time, and a new gym was added to new classrooms and office space. In November 1962, an addition was made to the school's west. Science labs, a cafeteria, classrooms, and a library blocked the view of the original Antioch Township High School, renamed Antioch Community High School the following year. In 1972, additions were needed again to house the 1,377 students enrolled. Additions to the north wing include driver ed and fine arts facilities, a new gym, lockers, 24 classrooms, and a commons area. However, only 26 years later, the school underwent a major renovation to accommodate the population growth in the 1990s. The original building was razed in 1998 to pave the way for extensive remodeling and new additions. A third gymnasium was built in 2004. More than $16 million in renovations have been made since 2003.

The current ACHS logo was created in the early 1970s by John O'Hara for the football squad. Other sports teams soon adopted the logo, and before long, the image was used as a school-wide symbol. According to the ACHS website: "The "A" in the center stands for Antioch (naturally), and the circle surrounding it represents the unity of the students and athletes who wear the symbol. The arrow always faces forward, symbolizing the need to move ahead and overcome obstacles. Two feathers below the arrow represent teamwork and working together to achieve success."

There is no Native American tribe named "Sequoit" (pronounced see-kwoit) or any Native American word. Though "sequoit" has Native American origins, the story behind the name is complicated and confusing. Fred Willman explained in his in-depth book examining Illinois high school nicknames, "Why Mascots Have Tales," "The word Sequoit is a form of spelling of the Iroquois Indian word Sa-da-quoit, which was the name the Iroquois Indians gave to a stream that flows through Oneida County in New York state. In the Iroquois language, Sa-da-quoit means 'smooth pebbles in the bed of a stream.' When white settlers moved into Oneida County, they modified the spelling and pronunciation of the stream to Sauquoit Creek."

Antioch's first settlers, Darius and Thomas Gage, traveled west from Oneida County and named the stream that ran past their land "Sequoit Creek" because it reminded them of Sauquoit Creek back home. Many local businesses and ACHS sports teams used "sequoit" in their names. In its early years, students would dress in Native American apparel and perform during half-time, but over time, the performances died out. The Sequoit logo and spirit have remained intact throughout the ages, even though similar Native American-inspired team names and mascots have been changed.

== Athletics ==
Boys sports include baseball, basketball, cross country, football, golf, lacrosse, soccer, swimming, tennis, track, volleyball, and wrestling. Girls sports include basketball, bowling, cheerleading, cross country, dance, field hockey, golf, gymnastics, soccer, softball, tennis, track, and volleyball.

== Academics ==
Antioch's 2015 ACT composite score is 21.9, its graduation rate is 95 percent, 89 percent of seniors are listed as college-bound, and the attendance rate is 93.2 percent. The average class size is 18.7, and the pupil-to-teacher ratio is 17 to 1. The staff's average teaching experience is 12.7 years. Antioch has made Adequate Yearly Progress on the Prairie State Achievement Examination, a state test part of the No Child Left Behind Act, as of August 2007.

== Notable alumni ==
- Dale Barnstable (class of 1946), basketball player for the University of Kentucky and a figure in the 1950s college basketball point-shaving scandal
- Paul DeJong (class of 2011), Major League Baseball player for the Kansas City Royals
- Eric Eckenstahler (class of 1995), former Major League Baseball pitcher, played for the Detroit Tigers
- James Grippando (class of 1976), New York Times Bestselling author, winner of the Harper Lee Prize for Legal Fiction
- Athan Kaliakmanis (class of 2021), NFL quarterback for the Washington Commanders
- John Peck, American military veteran and memoirist who underwent a successful bilateral arm transplant
- Anthony Starke (class of 1981), actor, Nip/Tuck and Prison Break
- John Thain (class of 1977), former chairman and CEO of Merrill Lynch before its distressed merger with Bank of America
