= Community High School District 117 =

School district in Illinois, United States

Address
- 1625 Deep Lake Road Lake Villa, Illinois, 60046; United States

District information
- Grades: 9-12
- Superintendent: Dr. Jeff Feucht
- Schools: Antioch Community High School; Lakes Community High School

Other information
- Website: Official website

Community High School District 117 is a 9-12 high school district based in Lake Villa, Lake County, Illinois that serves both the city where it is based and the village of Antioch, Illinois, alongside Old Mill Creek and Lindenhurst. District 117 is composed of two high schools: Antioch Community High School, which is located in the city of its namesake; and Lakes Community High School, which is, in turn, located in Lake Villa. The district superintendent is Dr. Jeff Feucht. Jori Bowen oversees Lakes as principal, Eric Hamilton serves as the principal of Antioch.

Both Lakes and Antioch sport a band department and choral department; as well as color guards, various teams, clubs, and honor societies.
