= Lone Tree Corners, Illinois =

- Former community
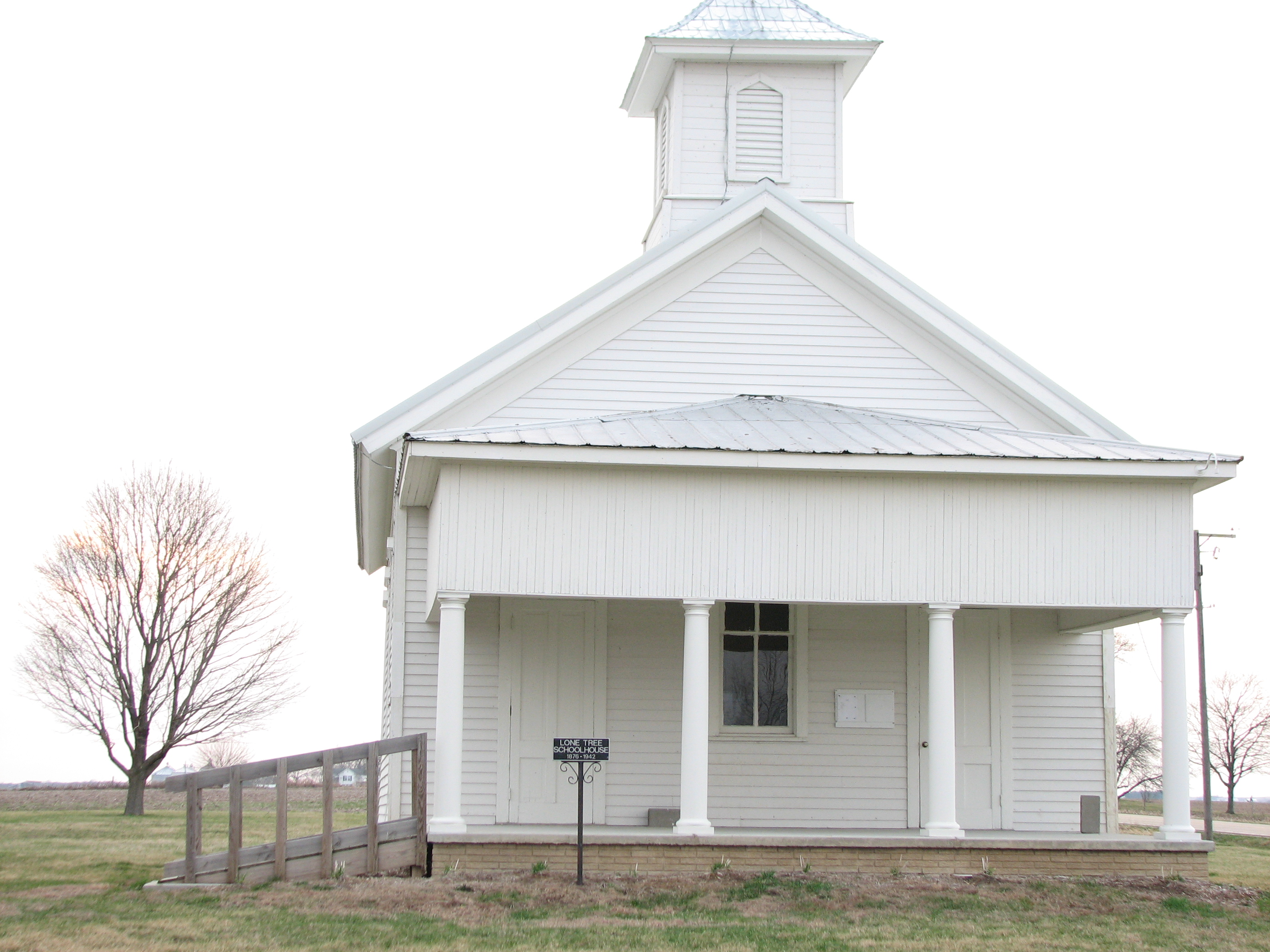
- Lone Tree School

- Location within Illinois Location within the United States
- Coordinates: 41°11′05″N 89°29′08″W
- Country: United States
- State: Illinois
- County: Bureau
- Elevation: 702 ft (214 m)
- Time zone: UTC-6 (Central (CST))
  - Summer (DST): UTC-5 (CDT)
- Area codes: 815 & 779
- GNIS feature ID: 1719790

Lone Tree Corners, also known as Lone Tree, is a former community in Bureau County, Illinois, United States, located east of Bradford. The community was established in the 1840s. Its name came from an oak tree in the area; the tree was 100 feet (30 m) tall, and one could reportedly see as far away as Peoria from the top. In the 1920s, the last buildings in the community were demolished, save for the Lone Tree School; the school closed in 1942 but is still standing and is listed on the National Register of Historic Places.
