= Bowyer-Holladay House =

Archaeological site in Virginia, United States

- U.S. National Register of Historic Places
- Virginia Landmarks Register
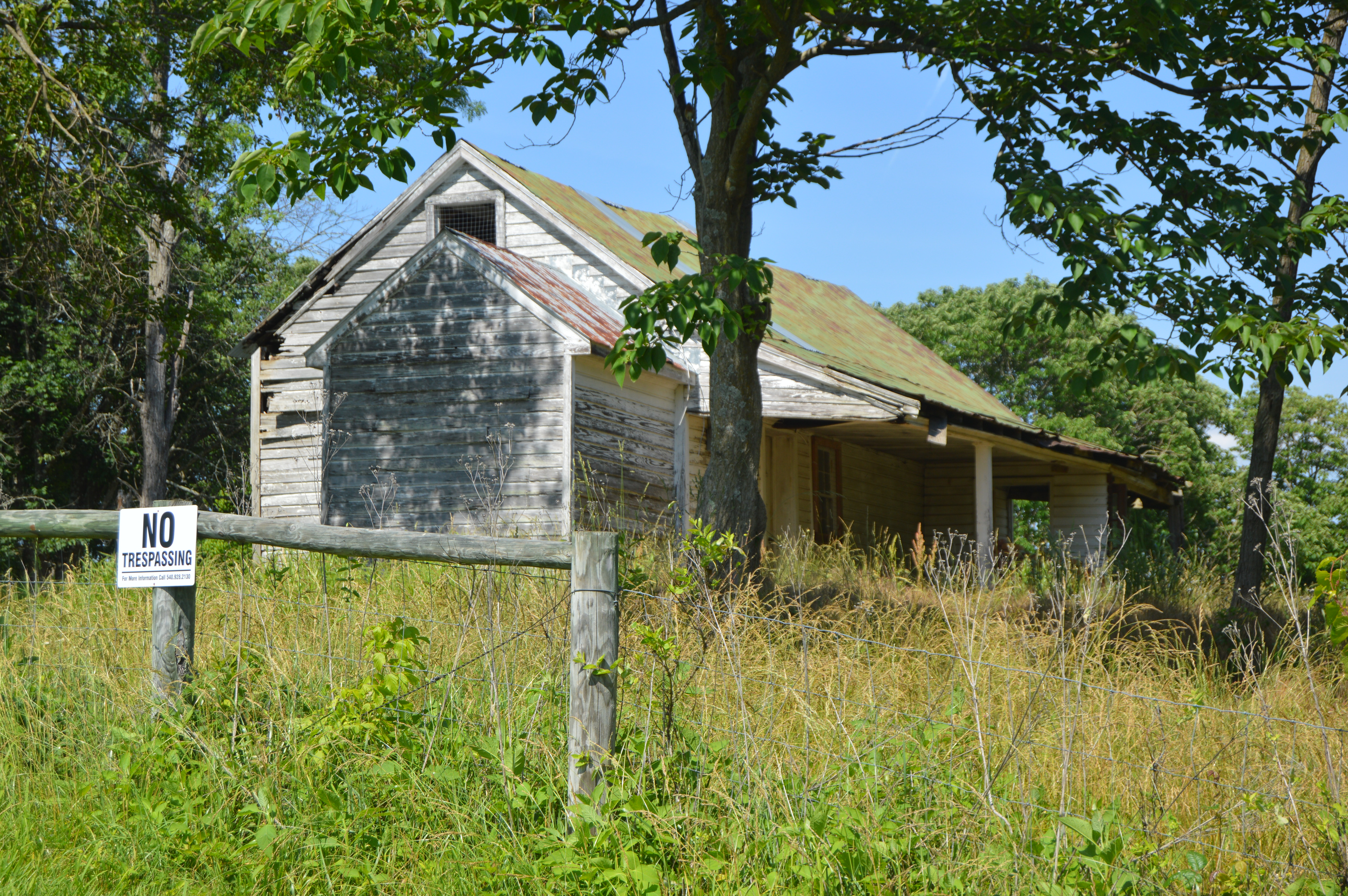
- Western side of the house

- Location within Virginia Location within the United States
- Location: US 220, Fincastle, Virginia
- Coordinates: 37°26′19″N 79°54′24″W
- Area: 17 acres (6.9 ha)
- Built: c. 1830
- NRHP reference No.: 99000704
- VLR No.: 011-0028

Significant dates
- Added to NRHP: June 10, 1999
- Designated VLR: March 17, 1999

Bowyer-Holladay House, also known as the Lewis Holladay House, is a historic archaeological site located near Fincastle, Botetourt County, Virginia. The site is located in The Botetourt Center at Greenfield industrial park. The site consists of the ruins of an Early Republic/Federal Style two-story brick house with a limestone lined cellar in a rear-centered ell configuration. The house was part of the plantation complex commonly referred to as the "Holladay Place." In addition to the ruins of the main house, a log structure with an early timber and modern frame addition survives 25 feet north of the bulkhead entrance to the limestone cellar.

It was listed on the National Register of Historic Places in 2010.
