= Fincastle, Virginia =

- Town
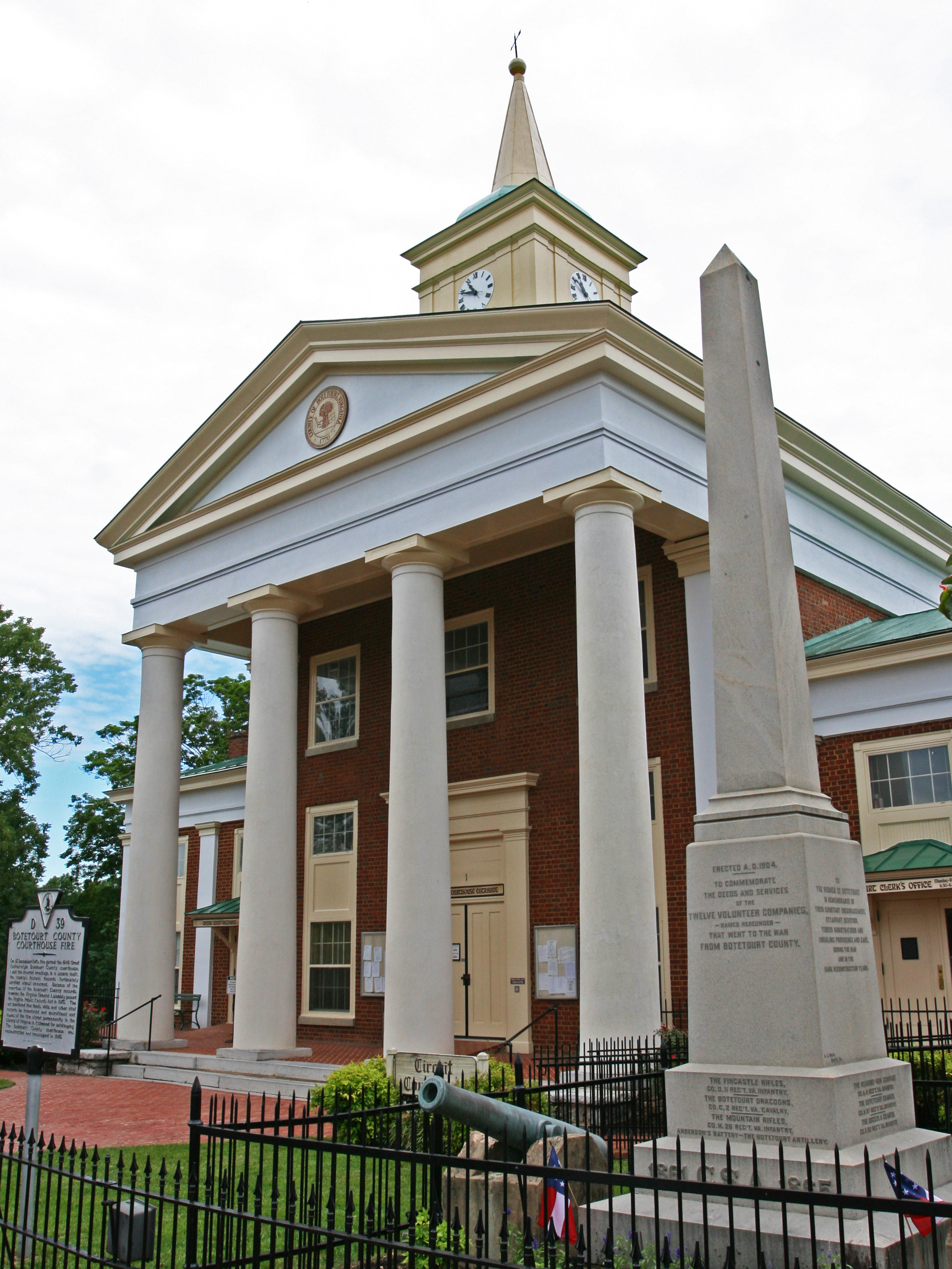
- The historic Botetourt County Courthouse in Fincastle, Virginia.

- Seal

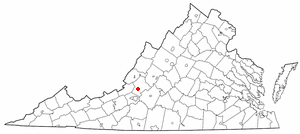
- Location of Fincastle, Virginia
- Coordinates: 37°29′58″N 79°52′36″W
- Country: United States
- State: Virginia
- County: Botetourt
- Incorporated: 1772

Government
  - Type: Council–manager
  - Mayor: Mary Bess Smith
  - Town Manager: Melanie Young McFadyen

Area
  - Total: 2.05 sq mi (5.32 km^{2})
  - Land: 2.05 sq mi (5.30 km^{2})
  - Water: 0.0077 sq mi (0.02 km^{2})
- Elevation: 1,240 ft (378 m)

Population (2020)
  - Total: 755
  - Density: 369/sq mi (142/km^{2})
- Time zone: UTC-5 (Eastern (EST))
  - Summer (DST): UTC-4 (EDT)
- ZIP Code: 24090
- Area codes: 540 and 826
- FIPS code: 51-27824
- GNIS feature ID: 1498478
- Website: www.townoffincastle.org

Fincastle is a town in Botetourt County, Virginia, United States. The population was 755 at the 2020 census. It is the county seat of Botetourt County. It is part of the Roanoke metropolitan area.

== History ==
The town of Fincastle was originally settled by Scotch-Irish and German immigrants from Pennsylvania who arrived in the region in the mid-18th century. John Miller erected a sawmill which became the nucleus of the early village of Fincastle. In 1770, Botetourt County was separated from Augusta County, and Miller's home was selected as the meeting place for the court. Two years later, Israel Christian donated 45 acres (18 ha) of land and laid out the streets and lots for the new town of Fincastle. The town's name was selected to honor George, Lord Fincastle, the eldest son of Virginia's Lieutenant Governor, Lord Dunmore.

In 1773, the first log courthouse was built on the designated court square at the center of Fincastle. Around the same time, a brick church was constructed on land donated by Israel Christian to serve as the established (Anglican) house of worship for the town. The church closed after the disestablishment of the Anglican Church in Virginia during the Revolutionary War and was later occupied by Presbyterians who rebuilt the structure to its present Greek Revival style. By the early-19th century, the village had grown into an important regional center of commerce, especially for the wool industry, aided by the construction of taverns, hotels, and shops. A second courthouse was erected in 1818 and replaced by a third, a larger brick structure of Greek Revival style in 1850. This courthouse continues to serve Botetourt County today, having been rebuilt after a disastrous fire in 1970.

The Bowyer-Holladay House, Breckinridge Mill, Fincastle Historic District, Greenfield, Hawthorne Hall, Prospect Hill, Santillane, Wheatland Manor, and Wiloma are listed on the National Register of Historic Places.

== Geography ==
Fincastle is located at 37°29′58″N 79°52′36″W (37.499421, -79.876674).

In May 2018, a boundary line adjustment increased the town's total area from 0.2 square mile (0.6 km^{2}) to 2.06 square miles (5.32 km^{2}).

== Demographics ==
Historical population
Census	Pop.	Note	%±
1860	896		—
1880	675		—
1900	652		—
1910	479		−26.5%
1920	457		−4.6%
1930	517		13.1%
1940	442		−14.5%
1950	405		−8.4%
1960	403		−0.5%
1970	397		−1.5%
1980	282		−29.0%
1990	236		−16.3%
2000	359		52.1%
2010	353		−1.7%
2020	755		113.9%
U.S. Decennial Census

=== 2020 census ===
As of the census of 2020, there were 755 people residing in the town. There were 342 housing units. The racial makeup of the town was 85.0% White, 8.2% African American or Black, 0.3% American Indian, 1.2% Asian, 0.0% Pacific Islander, 1.3% from other races, and 4.0% from two or more races. Hispanic or Latino of any race were 2.4% of the population.

=== 2010 census ===
At the 2010 census, there were 353 people residing in the town. There were 143 housing units. The racial makeup of the town was 89.0% White, 9.3% African American, 0.0% Native American, 0.6% Asian, 0.0% Pacific Islander, 1.1% from other races, and 0.0% from two or more races. Hispanic or Latino of any race were 1.7% of the population.

=== 2000 census ===
At the 2000 census there were 359 people, 129 households, and 83 families living in the town. The population density was 1,480.8 people per square mile (577.5/km^{2}). There were 142 housing units at an average density of 585.7 per square mile (228.4/km^{2}). The racial makeup of the town was 89.69% White, 7.52% African American, 0.28% Native American, 0.28% Asian, 1.67% from other races, and 0.56% from two or more races. Hispanic or Latino of any race were 1.95%.

Of the 129 households 27.1% had children under the age of 18 living with them, 51.9% were married couples living together, 10.1% had a female householder with no husband present, and 34.9% were non-families. 32.6% of households were one person and 13.2% were one person aged 65 or older. The average household size was 2.39 and the average family size was 3.04.

The age distribution was 19.8% under the age of 18, 11.1% from 18 to 24, 32.3% from 25 to 44, 24.2% from 45 to 64, and 12.5% 65 or older. The median age was 39 years. For every 100 females there were 117.6 males. For every 100 females age 18 and over, there were 126.8 males.

The median household income was $33,438 and the median family income was $54,688. Males had a median income of $32,500 versus $21,563 for females. The per capita income for the town was $19,954. None of the families and 2.3% of the population were living below the poverty line, including no under eighteens and 10.2% of those over 64.

== Government ==
Fincastle operates a council–manager form of government. Fincastle Town Council is composed of a mayor and six council members who are elected at-large.

The United States Postal Service operates the Fincastle Post Office within the town.

== Education ==
The town is served by Botetourt County Public Schools. Public school students residing in Fincastle are zoned to attend Breckenridge Elementary School, Central Academy Middle School, and James River High School. Brekenridge Elementary School, Central Academy Middle School, and the Botetourt Technical Education and Training Center are located within the town limits.

Greenfield Education & Training Center is located south of Fincastle in the Botetourt Center at Greenfield. The center is operated by Virginia Western Community College and provides career studies certificates in welding, commercial HVAC, and healthcare programs. Additional higher education institutions are located in Roanoke and Hollins.

== Transportation ==
=== Air ===
The Roanoke-Blacksburg Regional Airport is the closest airport with commercial service to the town.

=== Highway ===
- U.S. Route 220 (Botetourt Road/Roanoke Road)

== Notable people ==
- Jacob Ammen, (1807–1894), born in Fincastle, Union Army general
- Joseph R. Anderson, (1813–1892), born in Fincastle, Confederate Army general and iron manufacturer
- Ben Cline (born 1972), U.S. Representative for Virginia's 6th congressional district
- John Strother Griffin (1816–1898), physician and land developer, Los Angeles, California
- John M. Peck (died 1985), member of the Virginia House of Delegates
- William Radford (1808–1890), Union Navy officer and later Admiral
