= John Peck (amputee) =

American Marine sergeant (born 1985/86)

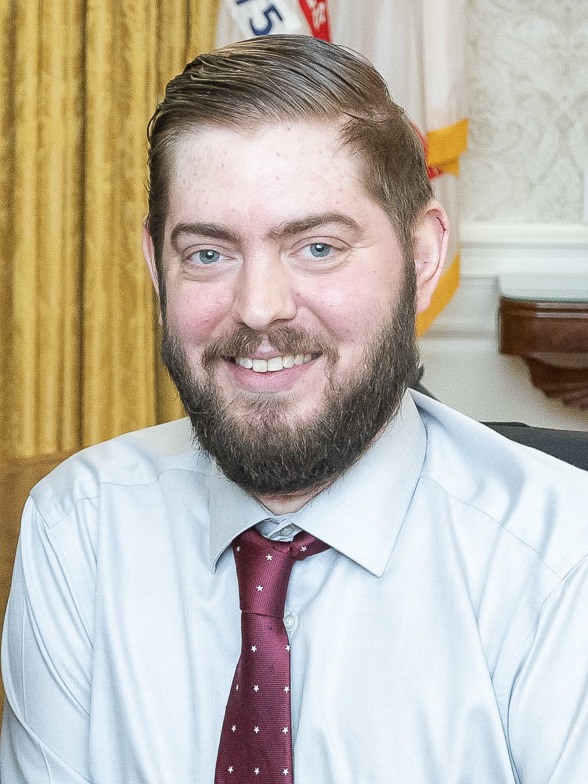
- Born: 1985 or 1986 (age 40–41)
- Military career
- Allegiance: United States
- Branch: United States Marine Corps
- Rank: Sergeant
- Unit: 3rd Battalion, 1st Marines
- Conflicts: Iraq War; War in Afghanistan
- Awards: Purple Heart (x2)

John Peck is an American Marine sergeant who lost both his legs and arms during a mission in Afghanistan in 2010. He lost both legs and one arm when an improvised explosive device he stepped on exploded; while recovering in the hospital, an infection forced amputation of his remaining arm. He successfully underwent a ground-breaking bilateral arm transplant in August 2016.

== Early life ==
Peck attended Thomas Jefferson High School in Rockford, Illinois before graduating from Antioch Community High School in Antioch.

== Career ==
=== Military ===
John Peck was awarded the Purple Heart on two occasions; first for serious injuries sustained in Iraq, and again when he was catastrophically wounded in Afghanistan. He suffered a traumatic brain injury when an IED exploded underneath his truck in Iraq in 2007, leaving him with a lengthy recovery period. In 2010, Peck re-enlisted in the Marine Corps and deployed to Afghanistan.

In May 2010, an IED explosion resulted in the loss of both of Peck’s legs and one of his arms. Infection led to the amputation of his remaining arm, making him the third surviving quadruple-amputee from the Iraq and Afghanistan wars.

In August 2016, after two years on the waiting list, John underwent a 14-hour, double arm transplant surgery at Brigham and Women’s Hospital in Boston. He is the second quadruple-amputee from the wars in Iraq and Afghanistan to get a double arm transplant.

=== Post military ===
Peck wrote a book, Rebuilding Sergeant Peck: How I Put Body and Soul Back Together After Afghanistan, that was released on May 7, 2019. Also a documentary was made about him.

In 2021, Our Life released a documentary, The Man with Another Man's Arms, following Peck's recovery from bilateral arm transplant on YouTube. The video received over 8,000,000 views within its first year. He was also named Military Times Veteran of the Year for 2021.

== Bibliography ==
- Rebuilding Sergeant Peck: How I Put Body and Soul Back Together After Afghanistan. Skyhorse Publishing, 2019. ISBN 1510740651
