= Wheatland Township, Bureau County, Illinois =

Wheatland Township
- Township
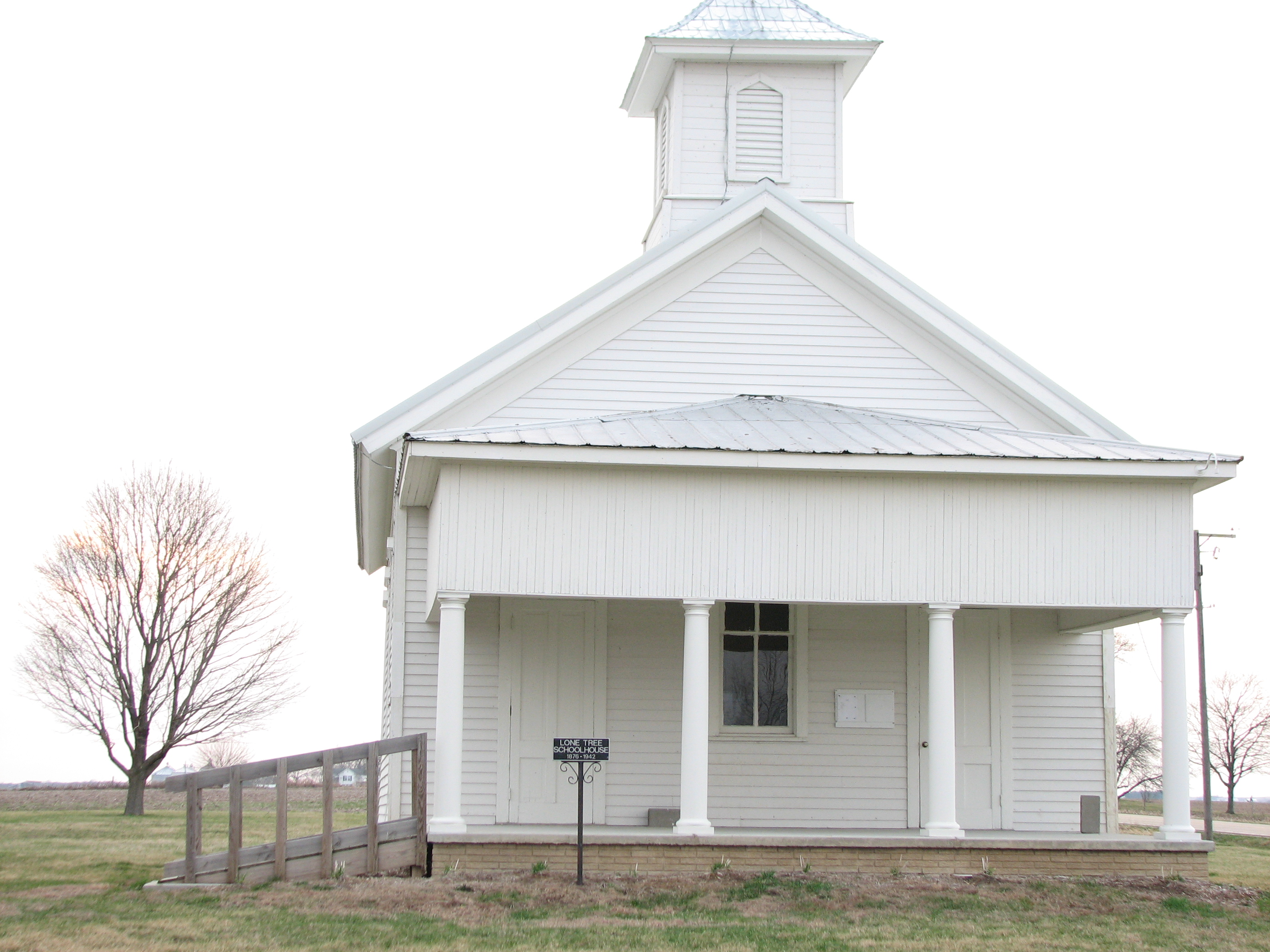
- Lone Tree School, now the township hall

- Location in Bureau County

- Bureau County's location in Illinois
- Coordinates: 41°11′58″N 89°30′01″W
- Country: United States
- State: Illinois
- County: Bureau
- Established: November 6, 1849

Area
  - Total: 17.83 sq mi (46.2 km^{2})
  - Land: 17.82 sq mi (46.2 km^{2})
  - Water: 0.01 sq mi (0.026 km^{2}) 0.06%
- Elevation: 682 ft (208 m)

Population (2020)
  - Total: 142
  - Density: 7.97/sq mi (3.08/km^{2})
- Time zone: UTC-6 (CST)
  - Summer (DST): UTC-5 (CDT)
- ZIP codes: 61368, 61421, 61537, 61560
- FIPS code: 17-011-81009

Wheatland Township is one of twenty-five townships in Bureau County, Illinois, USA. As of the 2010 census, its population was 142 and it contained 65 housing units. Wheatland Township was originally part of Milo Township, and became a separate township on an unknown date.

== Geography ==
According to the 2010 census, the township has a total area of 17.83 square miles (46.2 km^{2}), of which 17.82 square miles (46.2 km^{2}) (or 99.94%) is land and 0.01 square miles (0.026 km^{2}) (or 0.06%) is water.

=== Unincorporated towns ===
- Lone Tree Corners
- Whitefield

=== Cemeteries ===
- Hunter
- Lone Tree

== Demographics ==
As of the 2020 census there were 142 people, 30 households, and 30 families residing in the township. The population density was 7.95 inhabitants per square mile (3.07/km^{2}). There were 65 housing units at an average density of 3.64 per square mile (1.41/km^{2}). The racial makeup of the township was 97.18% White, 0.00% African American, 0.00% Native American, 0.00% Asian, 0.00% Pacific Islander, 0.00% from other races, and 2.82% from two or more races. Hispanic or Latino of any race were none of the population.

There were 30 households, out of which none had children under the age of 18 living with them, all were married couples living together, none had a female householder with no spouse present, and none were non-families. No households were made up of individuals. The average household size was 2.10 and the average family size was 2.10.

The township's age distribution consisted of 0.0% under the age of 18, 39.7% from 18 to 24, 0% from 25 to 44, 38.1% from 45 to 64, and 22.2% who were 65 years of age or older. The median age was 52.8 years. For every 100 females, there were 110.0 males. For every 100 females age 18 and over, there were 110.0 males.

Historical population
Census	Pop.	Note	%±
2010	135		—
2020	142		5.2%
US Decennial Census

== School districts ==
- Bradford Community Unit School District 1
- Henry-Senachwine Community Unit School District 5
- Princeton Elementary School District 115 and Princeton High School District 500

== Political districts ==
- Illinois's 18th congressional district
- State House District 73
- State Senate District 37
