= John M. Peck =

American politician (died 1985)

Member of the Virginia House of Delegates from the Craig and Botetourt counties district
- In office 1956–1964

Personal details
- Born: John Malcolm Peck Jr.
- Died: July 2, 1985 (aged 66) Salem, Virginia, U.S.
- Resting place: Godwin Cemetery
- Party: Democratic
- Spouse: Martha Murray
- Children: 3
- Education: Roanoke National Business College
- Occupation: Politician; real estate

John Malcolm Peck Jr. (died July 2, 1985) was an American politician from Virginia. He served as a member of the Virginia House of Delegates from 1956 to 1964.

== Early life ==
John Malcolm Peck Jr. grew up in Fincastle, Virginia. He graduated from Roanoke National Business College. He went by the nickname Jack.

== Career ==
Peck served as a captain in the U.S. Army during World War II. He worked for Appalachian Power Company from 1945 to 1963. He was a member of the Fincastle Fire Department from 1947 to his death.

Peck was a Democrat. He served as a member of the Virginia House of Delegates, representing Craig and Botetourt counties, from 1956 to 1964. He was a member of the privileges and elections committee.

Around 1963, Peck opened a real estate office in Daleville. In 1967, he lost the race for Botetourt County commissioner of Revenue. In 1983, he was elected to the Botetourt County Board of Supervisors. In January 1984, he was named chairman of the board and stepped down for health reasons in December 1984 and resigned from the board in March 1985.

== Personal life ==
Peck married Martha Murray. They had a son and two daughters, John M. III, Susan and Patricia.

Peck died on July 2, 1985, aged 66, at a hospital in Salem. He was buried in Godwin Cemetery.
