= Wheatland Township, Ellis County, Kansas =

Wheatland Township
- Township
- Location in Ellis County
- Coordinates: 38°45′44″N 099°15′50″W
- Country: United States
- State: Kansas
- County: Ellis

Area
  - Total: 54.05 sq mi (139.98 km^{2})
  - Land: 54.05 sq mi (139.98 km^{2})
  - Water: 0 sq mi (0 km^{2}) 0%
- Elevation: 1,988 ft (606 m)

Population (2000)
  - Total: 386
  - Density: 7.1/sq mi (2.7/km^{2})
- GNIS feature ID: 0475294

Wheatland Township was a township in Ellis County, Kansas, United States. In the 2010 census, its population was 386.

== Geography ==
Wheatland Township covered an area of 54.05 square miles (140.0 km^{2}) and contained no incorporated settlements. According to the USGS, it contained one cemetery, Saint Francis.

The streams of Big Timber Creek and Shelter Creek ran through this township.

== Communities ==
It contained the census-designated place of Munjor.

== Transportation ==
Wheatland Township contained two airports or landing strips: Philip Ranch Airport and Stecklein Field.
