= Lake Villa, Illinois =

- Village
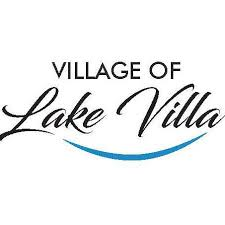
- Logo
- Motto: "Gateway to the Lake Region"
- Location of Lake Villa in Lake County, Illinois.
- Coordinates: 42°25′06″N 88°05′01″W
- Country: United States
- State: Illinois
- County: Lake

Area
  - Total: 7.30 sq mi (18.91 km^{2})
  - Land: 6.52 sq mi (16.88 km^{2})
  - Water: 0.78 sq mi (2.03 km^{2})
- Elevation: 791 ft (241 m)

Population (2020)
  - Total: 8,741
  - Density: 1,341.4/sq mi (517.93/km^{2})
- Time zone: UTC-6 (CST)
  - Summer (DST): UTC-5 (CDT)
- ZIP code: 60046
- Area codes: 847 and 224
- FIPS code: 17-41586
- GNIS feature ID: 2398385
- Website: www.villageoflakevilla.gov

Lake Villa is a village in Lake County, Illinois United States. Per the 2020 census, the population was 8,741. Lake Villa lies within Lake Villa Township and about 50 miles north of Chicago and is part of the United States Census Bureau's Chicago combined statistical area (CSA).

== Geography ==
According to the 2021 census gazetteer files, Lake Villa has a total area of 7.30 square miles (18.91 km^{2}), of which 6.52 square miles (16.89 km^{2}) (or 89.26%) is land and 0.78 square miles (2.02 km^{2}) (or 10.74%) is water.

The village lies in a gently rolling moraine landscape, dominated by lakes of glacial origin known as the Chain O'Lakes. Among these are Cedar Lake, north of the village center, and Deep Lake, to the east. There are several smaller lakes and ponds, along with a complement of wetlands. The lakes and ponds have been important in Lake Villa's historic tourist industry, and over the years led to a small ice industry.

Drainage is ultimate to the Des Plaines and Fox rivers, both of which flow to the Illinois River and ultimately the Mississippi.

The Wisconsin Central Railway runs through the village center. This is a heavily used freight line which also carries Metra commuter rail traffic from Antioch, Illinois to the West Loop, Chicago.

== Demographics ==
Historical population
Census	Pop.	Note	%±
1910	342		—
1920	407		19.0%
1930	487		19.7%
1940	438		−10.1%
1950	824		88.1%
1960	903		9.6%
1970	1,090		20.7%
1980	1,462		34.1%
1990	2,857		95.4%
2000	5,864		105.3%
2010	8,741		49.1%
2020	8,741		0.0%
U.S. Decennial Census; 2010 2020

=== Racial and ethnic composition ===
Lake Villa village, Illinois – Racial and ethnic composition Note: the US Census treats Hispanic/Latino as an ethnic category. This table excludes Latinos from the racial categories and assigns them to a separate category. Hispanics/Latinos may be of any race.
Race / Ethnicity (NH = Non-Hispanic)	Pop 2000	Pop 2010	Pop 2020	% 2000	% 2010	% 2020
White alone (NH)	5,335	7,109	6,404	90.98%	81.33%	73.26%
Black or African American alone (NH)	145	335	408	2.47%	3.83%	4.67%
Native American or Alaska Native alone (NH)	7	8	4	0.12%	0.09%	0.05%
Asian alone (NH)	96	437	534	1.64%	5.00%	6.11%
Native Hawaiian or Pacific Islander alone (NH)	5	0	3	0.09%	0.00%	0.03%
Other race alone (NH)	16	6	37	0.27%	0.07%	0.42%
Mixed race or Multiracial (NH)	79	132	362	1.35%	1.51%	4.14%
Hispanic or Latino (any race)	181	714	989	3.09%	8.17%	11.31%
Total	5,864	8,741	8,741	100.00%	100.00%	100.00%

=== 2020 census ===
As of the 2020 census, Lake Villa had a population of 8,741. The population density was 1,197.40 inhabitants per square mile (462.32/km^{2}). The median age was 39.8 years. 25.2% of residents were under the age of 18 and 12.6% of residents were 65 years of age or older. For every 100 females, there were 96.3 males, and for every 100 females age 18 and over, there were 91.9 males age 18 and over.

99.9% of residents lived in urban areas, while 0.1% lived in rural areas.

There were 3,115 households in Lake Villa, including 2,216 families. Of all households, 38.2% had children under the age of 18 living in them, 60.8% were married-couple households, 11.7% were households with a male householder and no spouse or partner present, and 21.4% were households with a female householder and no spouse or partner present. About 20.6% of all households were made up of individuals and 9.8% had someone living alone who was 65 years of age or older.

There were 3,254 housing units at an average density of 445.75 per square mile (172.11/km^{2}). Of these units, 4.3% were vacant. The homeowner vacancy rate was 1.3% and the rental vacancy rate was 8.1%.

=== Income and poverty ===
The median income for a household in the village was $105,639, and the median income for a family was $130,924. Males had a median income of $70,590 versus $47,642 for females. The per capita income for the village was $42,513. About 2.8% of families and 3.3% of the population were below the poverty line, including 2.6% of those under age 18 and 4.2% of those age 65 or over.

== Government ==
=== Elected officials ===
Mayor

- James McDonald

Clerk

- Mary Konrad

Trustees

- Scott Bartlett
- Tom O'Reilly
- Karen Harms
- Kevin Kruckeberg
- Allena Barbato
- Jeff Nielsen

== Education ==
School districts that serve Lake Villa include but are not limited to:

Elementary school districts

- Lake Villa Community Consolidated School District 41
- Antioch Community Consolidated School District 34

High school districts

- Antioch Community High School District 117

=== High schools ===
- Lakes Community High School in Lake Villa (grades 9–12)
- Grant Community High School in Fox Lake (grades 9–12)

=== Middle school(s) ===
- Peter J. Palombi Middle School in Lake Villa (Grades 6–8)

=== Elementary school(s) ===
- Olive C. Martin Elementary in Lake Villa (Grades PK-5)
- William L. Thompson Elementary in Lake Villa (Grades PK-5)
- Oakland Elementary in Lake Villa (Grades K-5)

=== Library ===
- Lake Villa District Library

== Infrastructure ==
=== Transportation ===
Lake Villa has a station on Metra's North Central Service, which provides daily rail service between Antioch and Chicago's Union Station.

=== Major streets ===
- Milwaukee Avenue
- Grand Avenue
- Grass lake Road
- Petite Lake Road
- Deep Lake Road
- Fairfield Road
- Cedar Lake Road
- Monaville Road
- Old Grand Avenue
