= Haxall =

Haxall is a surname. Notable people with the name include:

- Bolling Walker Haxall (1814–1885), American president of Old Dominion Iron and Steel Works
- J. T. Haxall (1860–1939), American college football player
- Lee Haxall, American film and television editor

== See also ==
- Haxall Canal, partially built canal in Virginia
- Bolling Haxall House, historic residential building in Richmond, Virginia
