= Brown's Island =

Artificial island in Virginia, USA

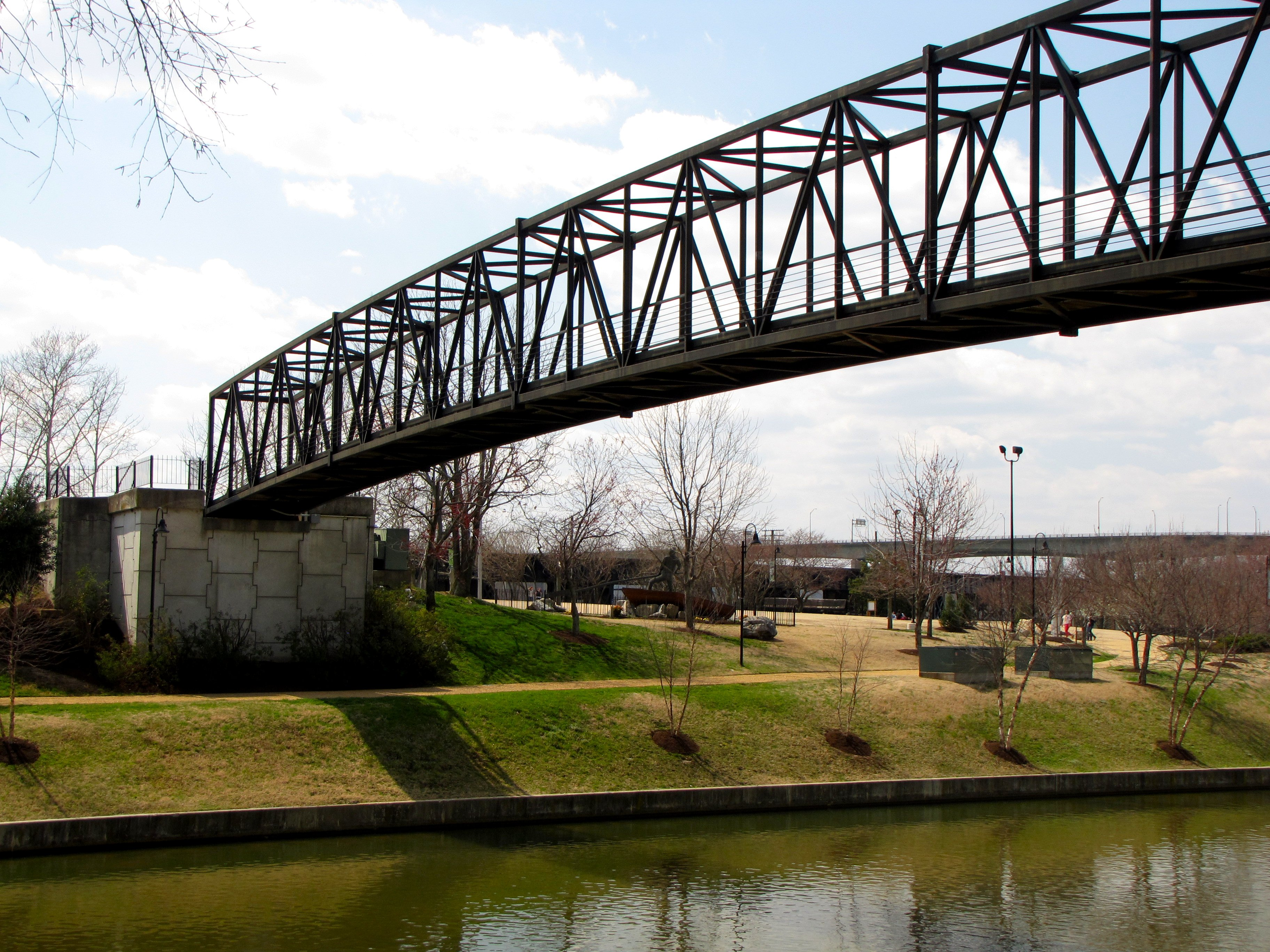
- 7th Street footbridge over the Haxall Canal to Brown's Island
- Interactive map of Brown's Island

Geography
- Location: Richmond, Virginia
- Coordinates: 37°32′0″N 77°26′23″W
- Area: 0.036 sq mi (0.093 km^{2})

Brown's Island is an artificial island on the James River in Richmond, Virginia, formed by the Haxall Canal. Part of the city's James River Park System, it is a popular concert and festival venue. The Rivanna Subdivision Trestle and T. Tyler Potterfield Memorial Bridge cross over the island.

== Geography ==
Brown's Island was formed in 1789 during the construction of the Haxall Canal. A spillway between Brown's Island and Johnson's Island was filled in 1970, merging the two islands. A walkway extends south atop the old VEPCO Levee from the island into the James River, and another extends north along the Brown's Island Dam.

== History ==
=== Pre-industrial ===
The island was formed in 1789 during the construction of the Haxall Canal. The island was named after Elijah Brown, who acquired the land in 1826. The island was briefly known as Neilson's Island, after a subsequent owner, before its name returned to Brown's Island. In the early nineteenth century, a private pleasure garden, named Prior’s Gardens, was built on the island.

During the American Civil War, the island was the home of the Confederate States Laboratory. The facility produced ammunition, friction primers, percussion caps, and other ordnance for the Confederate war effort. On March 13, 1863, an explosion occurred in a section of the laboratory that killed 50 and injured 14 people. Most of the killed and injured were young girls who were the labor force used on the island.

=== Industrial age ===
In 1894, Richmond Railway & Electric opened a coal power plant on the island, which powered the Richmond Union Passenger Railway. In 1899, a hydroelectric power plant on the island's east side, running off the Haxall Canal. The coal power plant was reopened as the Dixie Paper Mill in 1916. A steam-generated power plant was built on the island in 1936.

Starting in 1955, electricity production at the hydroelectric plant decreased, and ended altogether in 1965. In 1969, the steam power plant was damaged and shut down by flooding from Hurricane Camille. In 1970, the spillway between Johnson's and Brown's Islands was closed and the islands merged. Hurricane Agnes also flooded and closed the coal power plant in 1972, and the plant was closed altogether in 1975.

=== Modern age ===
In 1987, the Albemarle Paper Company gifted the island to the city, which incorporated it into the James River Park System. In 1993, Paul Di Pasquale's sculpture Headman was erected on the island's Eastside, depicting a man steering a James River Batteaux boat. In 1999, the Army Corps of Engineers refurbished the Haxall canal into a canal walk. The steam power plant was renovated in 2005. In 2016, the T. Tyler Potterfield Memorial Bridge was opened, connecting the island to Manchester for pedestrians and cyclists.

The island serves as a venue for concerts and outdoor events, such as Riverrock, the Friday Cheers concert series, and the Richmond Folk Festival.
