= West Ham (disambiguation) =

West Ham or Westham may refer to:

- West Ham, London, England, a suburb
  - County Borough of West Ham, a former administrative division
  - West Ham (ward), an electoral division
  - West Ham (UK Parliament constituency), a parliamentary constituency created in 1997
  - West Ham United F.C., a football club
  - West Ham station
- Westham, East Sussex, England, a village and civil parish
- Westham, Dorset, suburb of Weymouth, Dorset, England
- Westham, Virginia, United States, a former unincorporated community
  - Westham station, Henrico County; a train station
- West Ham, fictional town in The Society (TV series), an American teen drama
