= Westham, Virginia =

- Former Town
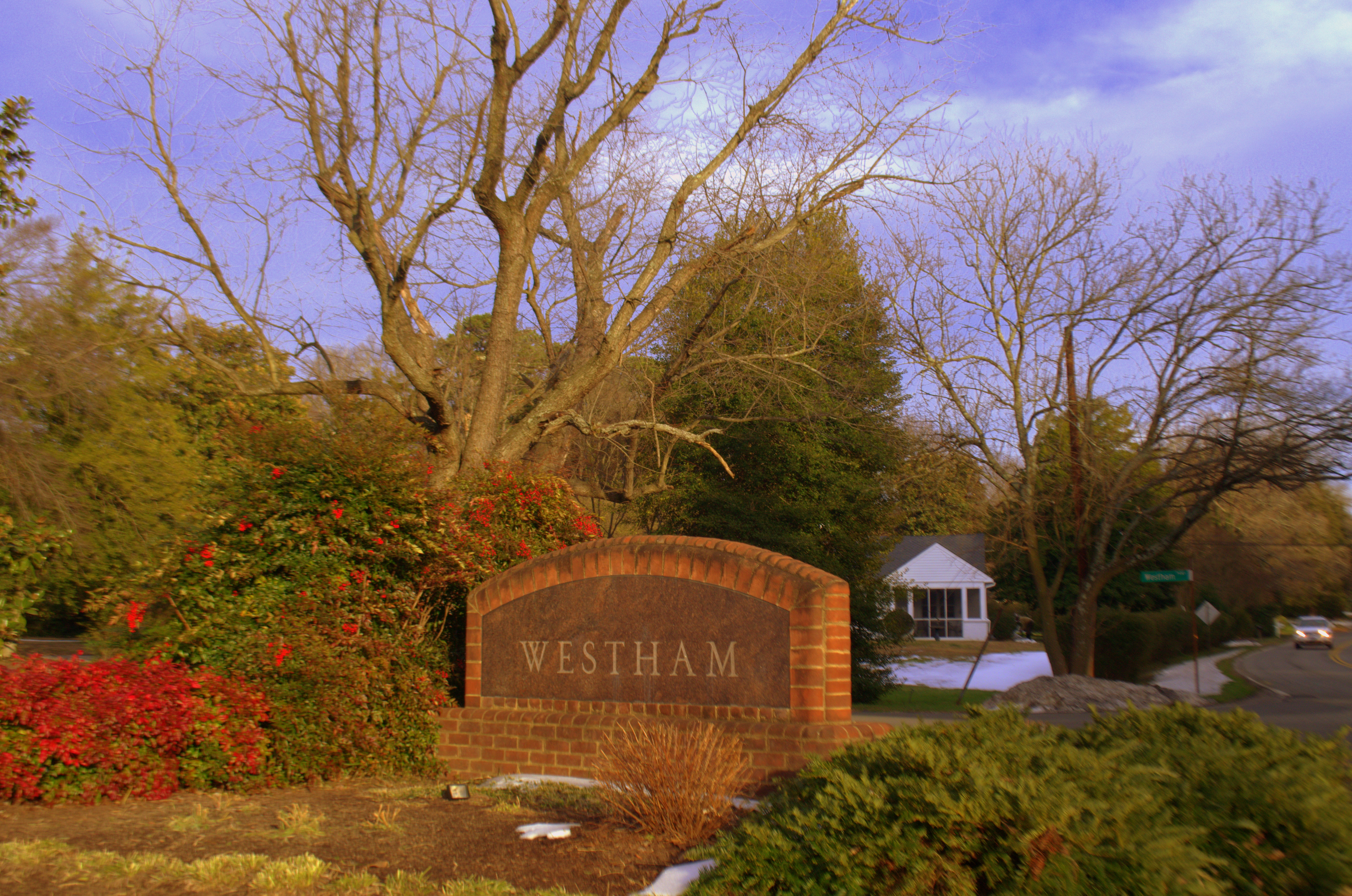
- Westham sign of neighborhood still called Westham built on the old town in 1930.
- Interactive map of Westham, Virginia
- Coordinates: 37°35′21″N 77°32′24″W
- Country: United States
- State: Virginia
- County: Henrico
- Established: c. 1750

Westham was an unincorporated town in Henrico County, Virginia. It is located in the present day area of Tuckahoe, Virginia. Westham was built at a transportation point on the James River. The James River flows free for several hundred miles from the west and Westham is located at the point where the Fall Line rocks prevented further river passage. Richmond, Virginia was built on the other side of the fall line where the river is navigable to the ocean. This made Westham the first destination for iron used in Revolutionary War. In later years, Canals and then Rail transport connected Westham to Richmond along the James River trade route. Westham was eventually absorbed into Richmond.

Westham, Virginia is shown between Tuckahoe Plantation and Richmond, Virginia on a portion of a map of part of Virginia drawn by Joshua Fry and Peter Jefferson in 1775.

== History ==
Westham was established on land that had been owned by William Randolph II. When Randolph died, his son Beverley inherited Westham Plantation and planned to create the town of Westham on part of it to facilitate trade in the Piedmont region of Virginia. After Beverley's sudden death, Peter Randolph inherited his brother's land and completed work on the project - renaming the town "Beverley" in honor of his older brother- with help from William Cabell and Peter Jefferson. Jefferson was one of a number of important Virginians, including Carter Braxton, Joshua Fry, John Hunter, Robert Rose, and William Stith. who purchased lots in the new town. Peter Randolph eventually sold Westham Plantation to his younger brother, William, who in turn sold the property to William Byrd III.

== Revolutionary War ==
David Ross, a Virginia Merchant, who bought Oxford Iron Works in Campbell County in 1779, supplied iron by flatbottom boats down the James River to a public foundry in Westham. The Virginia General Assembly resolved to have enslaved Africans as the workers in the foundry and only hire blacksmiths if slaves were not available. As a Commercial Agent supplying iron to the Revolutionary troops Virginia, Ross had to move out supplies from Westham just before a British raid on Richmond and Westham. Governor Thomas Jefferson asked for the foundry to be rebuilt but eventually the supplies were moved to rebuild the Point of Fork Arsenal.

== Kanawha Canal ==
The entry point of the Kanawha Canal in 1790 was built at Westham. Westham stood at the eastern end of over 200 miles of James River Flatwater carrying trade on James River bateaux. The canal took boats around the Great Falls of the James River in Richmond. Boats arriving from the West entered a 200-foot canal with three locks that dropped 34 feet, bypassing the first of the falls. One and a half miles of river eastward connected the boats to the second part of the canal to Shockoe Bottom in Richmond.

== Westham Plank Road ==
Westham Plank Road Company
- Industry: Roads
- Founded: March 29th, 1851 in Richmond, Virginia, United States
- Founders: Bernard Peyton, Bolling W.Haxall of the Bolling Haxall House, Poitiaux Robinson, Larkin W. Glazebrook and William W. Crump
- Headquarters: Richmond, Virginia, United States
- Areas served: Richmond, Virginia, Westham, Virginia
- Products: Westham Plank Road
- Owners: James C. Spots, David W. Haxall, Alexander C. Hutcheson and Thomas Ritchie, Jr.

In 1851 the Virginia General Assembly chartered the Westham Plank Road Company to build a plank road from Westham to Richmond. This connected not only the Bateaux floating down the James River to Westham with seagoing vessels in Richmond, but also connected to the Three Chopt Road which went over the Blue Ridge Mountains at Afton, Virginia. The road became present day Cary Street location of Carytown, Richmond, Virginia.

== Westham Station ==
Westham Station was established in the 1880s on the Richmond and Allegheny Railroad (R&A), which was laid along the towpath of the James River and Kanawha Canal. The R&A railroad was acquired by the Chesapeake and Ohio Railway (C&O) in the 1890s. Nearby, the Westham Bridge was built across the James River in 1911.

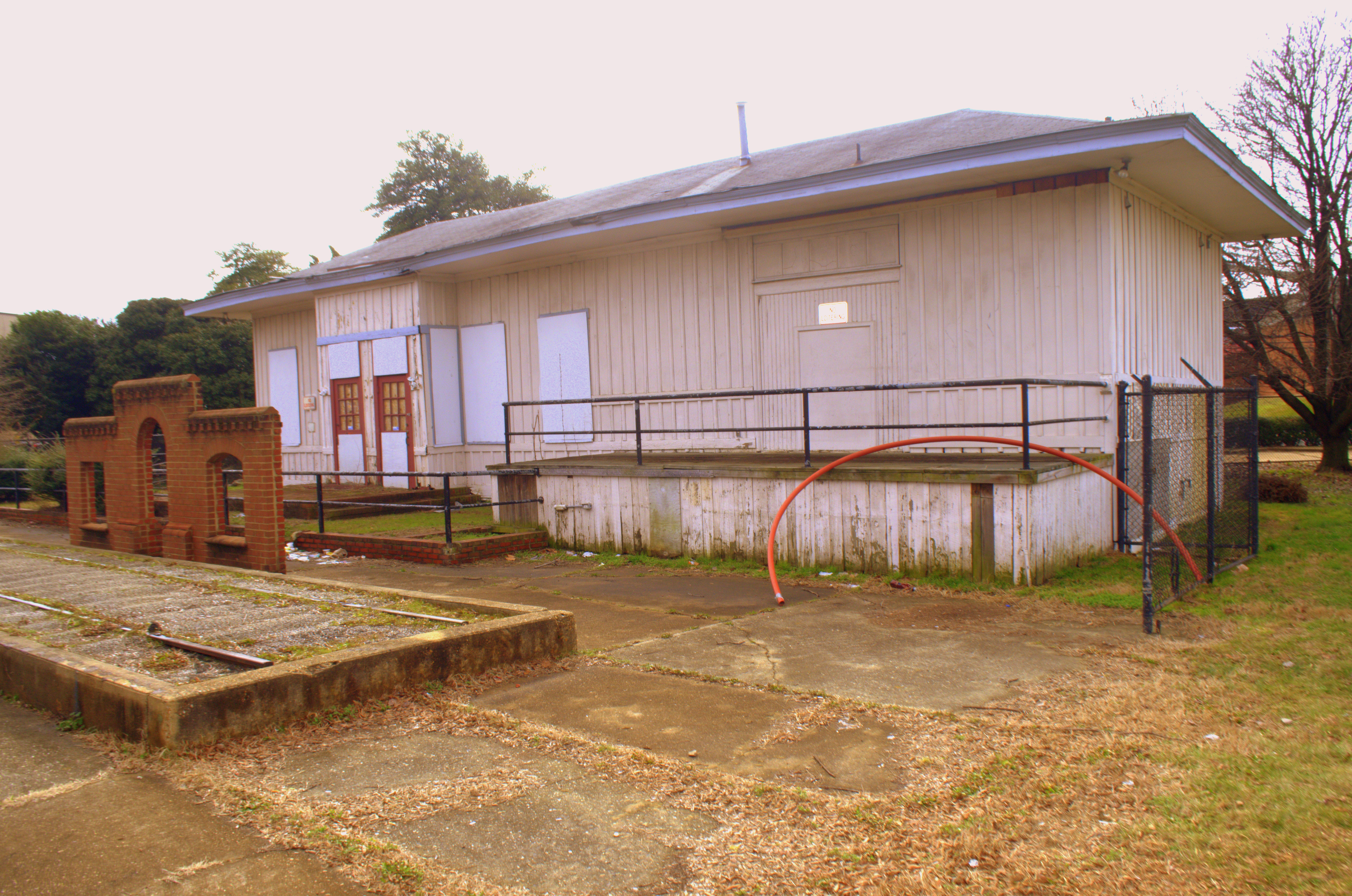
The Westham Station that was moved to a city park.

The historic Westham Station building was relocated to a Richmond city park in 1961.

== Present day ==
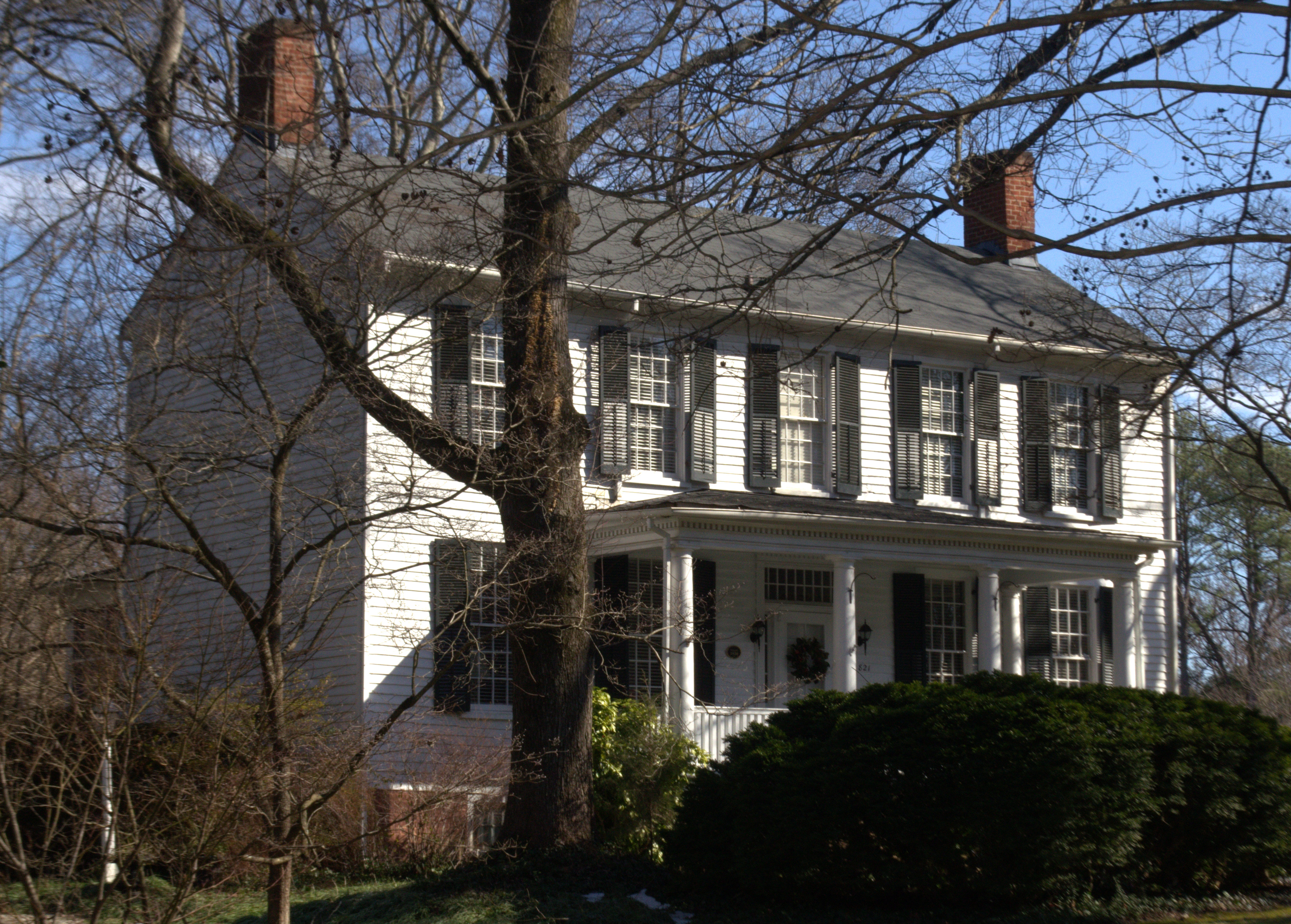
Westham House built c.1827

A neighborhood built on the site of the old town in the 1930s is still called Westham. The only town building older than the 1930s is just outside the original town borders and built around 1827.

== See also ==
- Former counties, cities, and towns of Virginia
