= T. Tyler Potterfield Memorial Bridge =

Railway bridge in Richmond, Virginia converted to pedestrian footbridge

Coordinates: 37°31′56.45″N 77°26′42.23″W

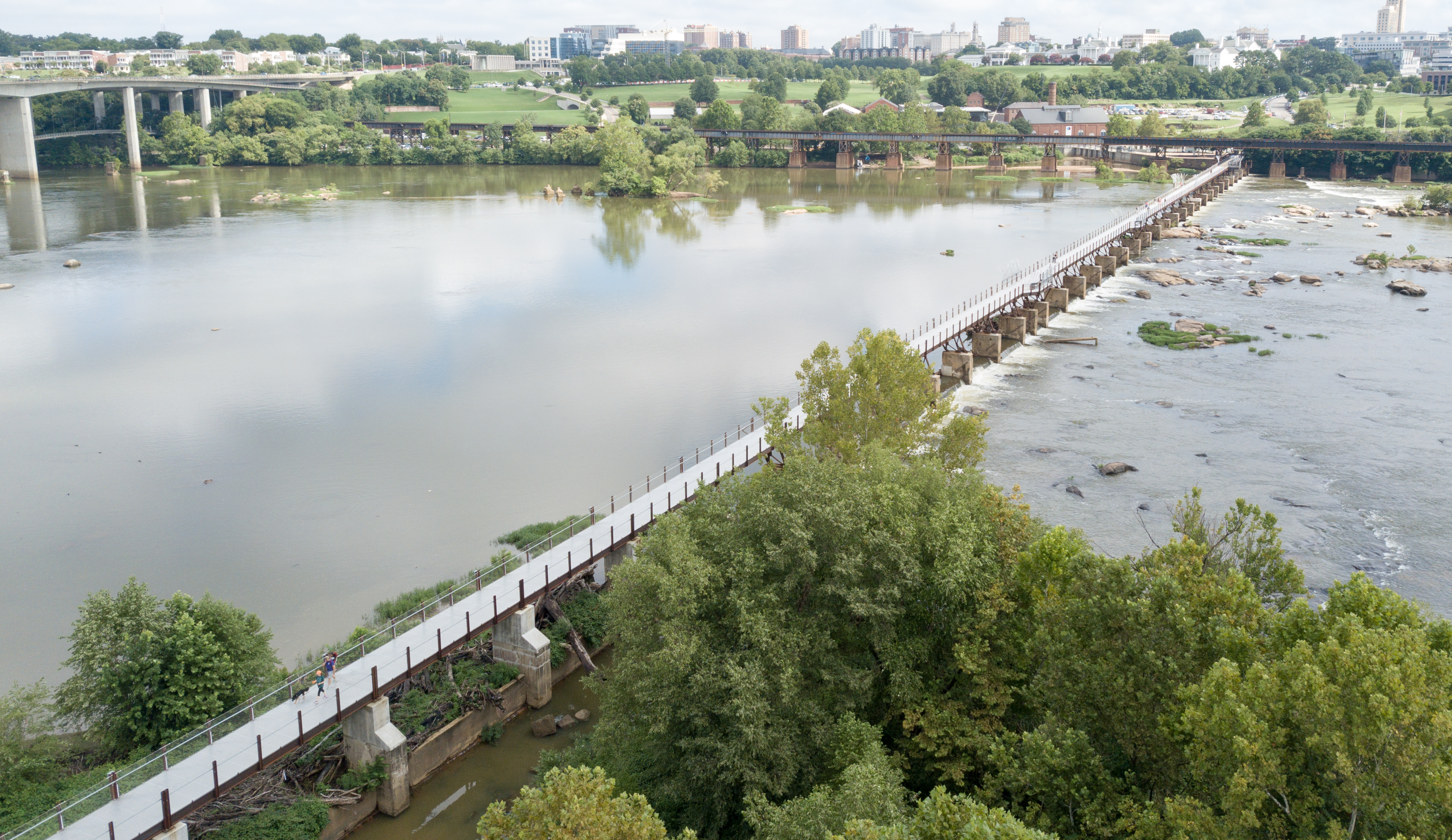
Bridge view from south side of the James River.

The T. Tyler Potterfield Memorial Bridge, also known as the VEPCO Levee Dam, and formerly the Brown's Island Dam Walk, crosses the James River in Richmond, Virginia connecting Brown's Island to the James River Park System on the Manchester side of the river.

Originally constructed as a dam in 1901 by the Virginia Electric and Power Company (VEPCO), now Dominion Energy, the 31.5 ft (9.6 m) structure diverted water into the Haxall Canal for the 12th Street Power Station, until its decommissioning in 1968. The bridge was renamed after T. Tyler Potterfield, a senior planner in the Richmond Department of Planning and Development Review who was the project manager for the redevelopment into a pedestrian bridge.

== History of dam redevelopment ==
There had been advocates for the creation of a dam walkway since before 2008, when city officials began to promote development initiatives along the river as part of their master planning process. In 2008, the Richmond Planning Commission released a plan discussing development initiatives along the river. Ralph White, Richmond's naturalist (widely credited with the success of the James River Park System) was quoted as saying "The highest single priority is the completion of the VEPCO levee"

By 2011, other public advocates were meeting with City of Richmond Department of Planning and Development and the consultant team from the architecture firm Hargreaves Associates (the firm hired to execute downtown plans) to make the pedestrian walkway a reality.

In November 2012, the City adopted the final version of the Richmond Riverfront Plan that showed several renderings and maps of a redeveloped Dam Walk using a pedestrian bridge feature.

In 2014, the city released new, detailed plans for the bridge, announcing that the walk would be 10 feet wide with at least four overlooks. Additional plans released in June 2014 were described by the Richmond Times Dispatch as: "The guardrails are expected to be 48 inches high -- six more than required to accommodate the expected bicycle traffic on the bridge. The deck would be placed over the existing piers and structures, but would require new augmented metal framework. The walkway would have lower, dim lights so as to not overpower the view of the river. Plans are underway for unified wayfinding markers and interpretive signage."

In 2014, the Virginia Commonwealth Transportation Board allocated $2.5 million to the Dam project, supplementing the $9 million the city has dedicated, to ensure the dam walk is fully funded. The Richmond times Dispatch quoted city Planning Director Mark Olinger as saying "This money gives us clear sailing on getting all the Brown’s Island [dam walk] stuff done, which we think will be an outstanding addition to the city". In May 2014, the Richmond Planning Commission requested that the bridge be named in honor of the late T. Tyler Potterfield, a senior planner with the city who was leading the dam walk project before his sudden death in late April. A resolution passed by the Planning Commission called the project one of the crowning achievements of Potterfield's career.

The bridge was reopened on December 2, 2016, after a $11.3 million renovation that began in October 2015. The wheelchair accessible bridge is open to pedestrians and cyclists 24 hours a day.
