= Old Pump House =

Former pumping station/power plant in Richmond, VA

Pump House Old Pump House Hollywood Electric Plant
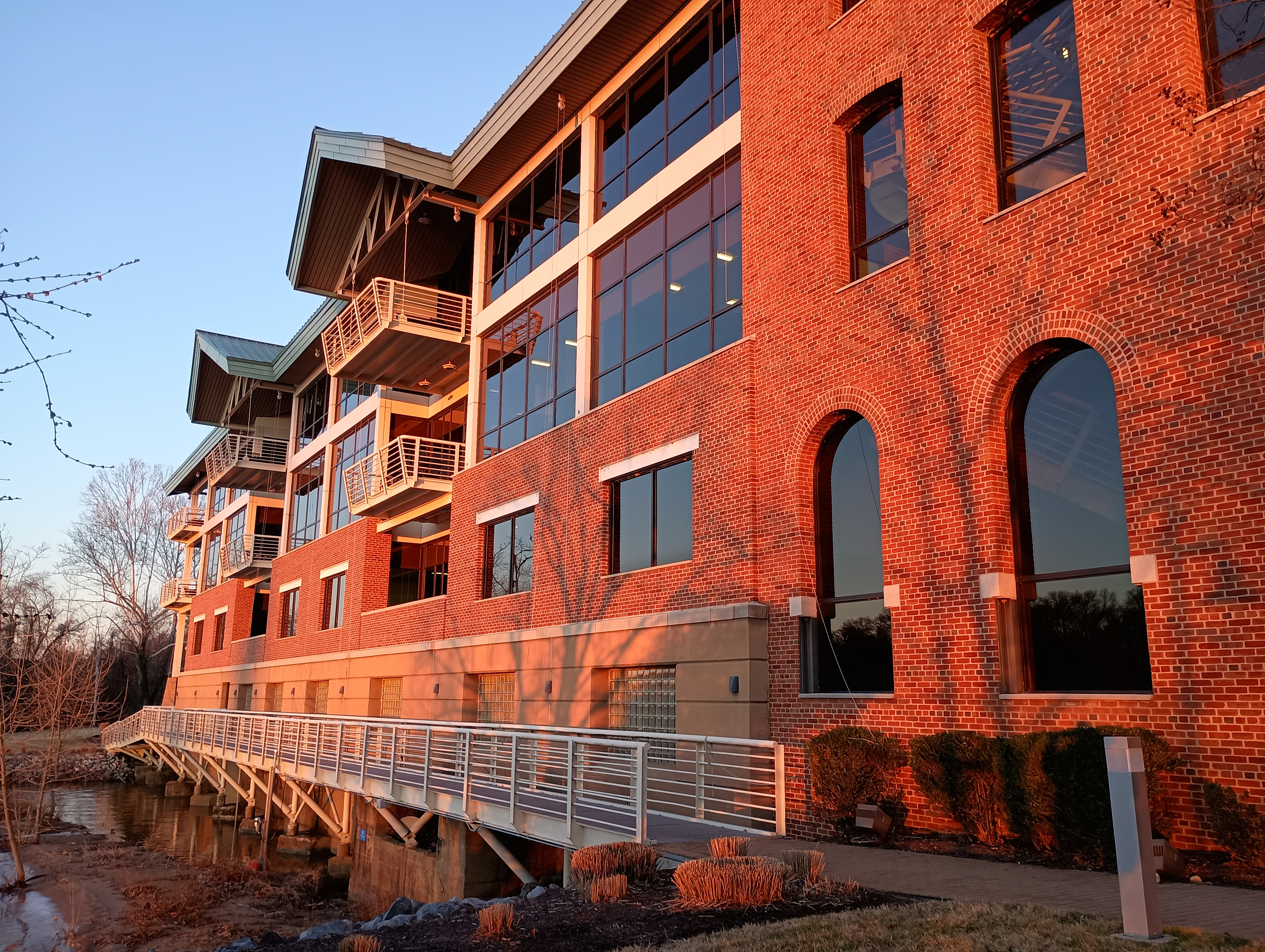
- Pump House building in 2026
- Interactive map of the Pump House; Old Pump House; Hollywood Electric Plant area

General information
- Location: 100 Tredegar St. Richmond, VA 23219
- Coordinates: 37.53328°N 77.45509°W
- Completed: 1832
- Renovated: 1834, 1854, 1874, 1909, 1929
- Owner: City of Richmond (1832-1988); James River Corporation (1988-1998); Dominion Energy (1998-present)

Technical details
- Material: Brick, Concrete, Granite
- Floor count: 3

Hollywood Dam
- Interactive map of Hollywood Dam
- Country: United States
- Location: Richmond, Virginia
- Coordinates: 37.53063°N 77.45823°W
- Purpose: Power

Dam and spillways
- Impounds: James River
- Length: 2,366 feet (721 m)

Hollywood Electric Plant
- Operator: City of Richmond
- Commission date: 1910
- Decommission date: 1986
- Type: Run-of-the-river
- Hydraulic head: 17 feet (5.2 m)
- Turbines: 1-4 (450 kW); 5 (400 kW); 6 (275 kW)
- Capacity factor: 90.5%

The Old Pump House, later known as the Hollywood Electric Plant is a historic industrial building located along the James River in Richmond, Virginia.

The building originally served as the first water pumping station for the city of Richmond before being converted to a power plant and later, office building.

== History ==
=== Pump House (1832-1909) ===
A public water system for Richmond was originally proposed in 1828 and a plan developed by Albert Stein was approved in 1830. As part of this plan, a water-driven pump house was constructed at the west end of Tredegar Street. It began operations on March 12, 1832 and supplied the Marshall Reservoir (located uphill near what is now Clark Springs Elementary School).

The Pump House, as it was originally known, was enlarged several times over the next century. Initially, the building contained a single double-acting piston pump powered by a 16 feet (4.9 m)-diameter breastshot (or "breast") water wheel. An additional pump was added in 1834, raising the pumping capacity to 400,000 US gallons (1,500,000 L; 330,000 imp gal) per day. This was followed by the addition of two more pumps in 1854. A Jonval turbine was installed in 1874, which powered two additional pumps that fed a new reservoir in what is now Byrd Park. A steam-powered pump was also added at this time, which drew water from the nearby James River and Kanawha Canal during periods when the river level was too low.

=== Hollywood Electric Plant (1910-1986) ===
Increasing demand for water led the city to construct the New Pump House further upriver, which began operations in 1883. The two pump houses operated in tandem until 1909 when the city converted the Old Pump House (as it was then known) to a generating station known as the Hollywood Electric Plant.

The plant originally contained four horizontal-shaft hydroelectric generating units rated at 600 horsepower (450 kW). (Note: There is a discrepancy here with the 1980 FERC filing, which has 340 kW.) A 1919 report also mentions the existence of three steam turbine generators: two rated at 1,000 horsepower (750 kW), and one rated at 2,000 horsepower (1,500 kW).

Two additional vertical-shaft units were added in 1929 as part of an expansion of the building. The first of these was powered by water from the James River and rated at 400 kW. The second utilized hydraulic power from the James River and Kanawha Canal and could supply 275 kW. This generator could be operated even when the river flow was insufficient to supply the remaining units.

Electricity generated at the plant was used to power streetlights and electric water pumps located in Byrd Park.

According to the city's re-licensing application to the Federal Energy Regulatory Commission in 1980, the plant typically achieved a capacity factor of 90.5% and produced an average of 14,600,000 kWh per year.

The Richmond City Council ordered the plant to be shut down in October 1986 citing increased costs and compliance with federal environmental regulations. The generators were later sold to a resident of Petersburg, Virginia who intended to install them in a hydroelectric plant along the Appomattox River.

=== Office Building (1988-present) ===
The building was eventually sold to the James River Corporation in 1988 for use as an office building. In 1998, it was acquired by Dominion Resources (now Dominion Energy).
