= Pony Pasture Rapids =

Pony Pasture
- Pony Pasture Rapids Park
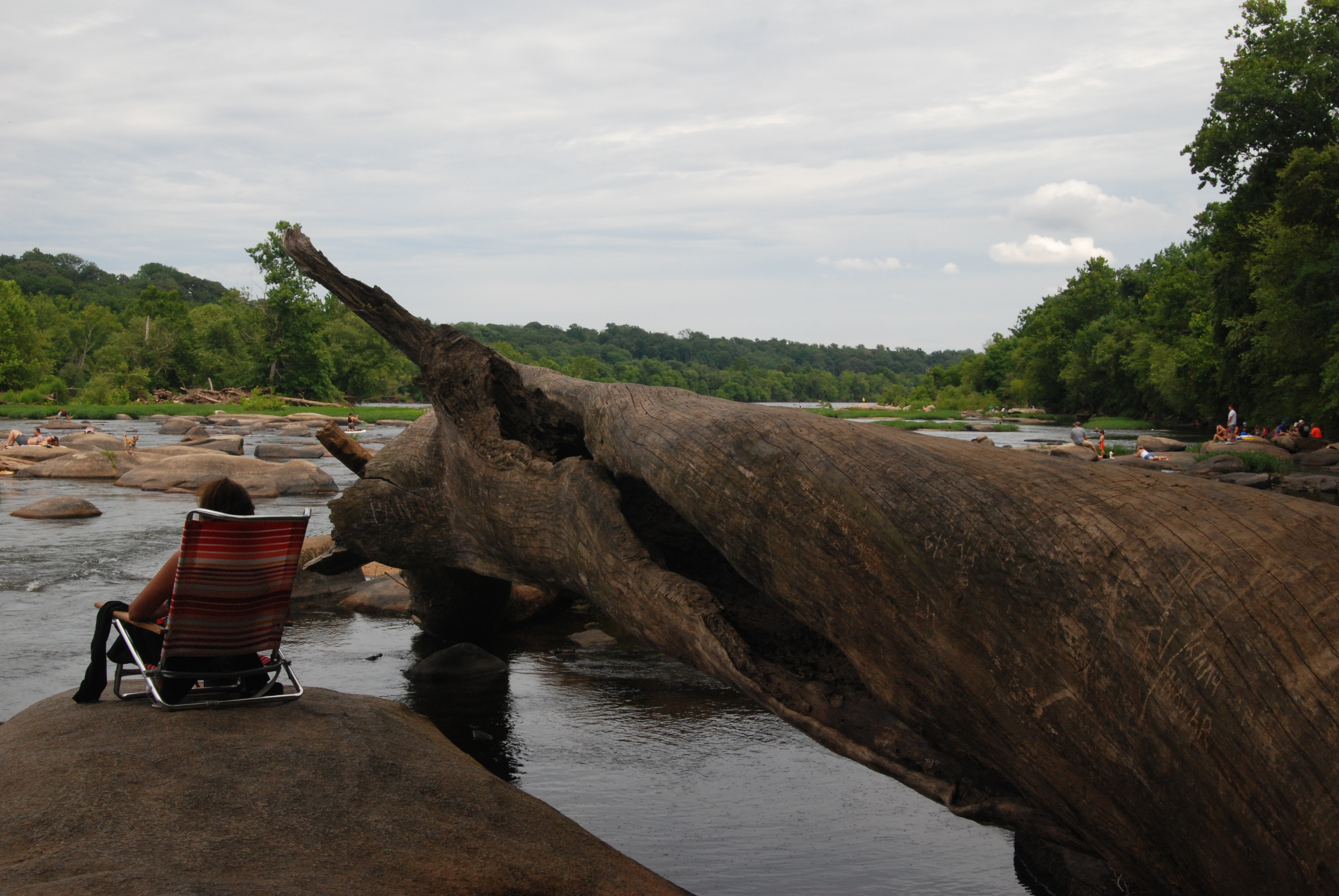

- Location within Virginia
- Location: Richmond, Virginia
- Coordinates: 37°33′2.68″N 77°31′11.76″W
- Operator: James River Park System
- Water: James River
- Website: jamesriverpark.org/explore-the-park-pony-pasture/

Pony Pasture Rapids (also commonly referred as Pony Pasture) is a section of the James River Park System that runs alongside the City of Richmond, VA. Nestled on the south bank of the James River downstream from the Huguenot Bridge, Pony Pasture is known for its local attractions of hiking, swimming, kayaking, and fishing. It has become a place for the residents of Richmond to experience the outdoors without having to leave town. With the help of park volunteers and funding from recycling projects, access to the rapids was made possible. The rapids, a class II, have become an introductory-level course for many rafters and kayakers in the area. Aside from the rapids, Pony Pasture Park hosts a lot of off-water activity. In addition to the park, there is Williams Island, an uninhabited 100-acre stretch of land that is nestled in the middle of the James River. Pony Pasture also has the largest parking lot in the James River Park System.

== History ==
Originally an abandoned stretch of parkland, Pony Pasture was part of the annexation of the northern part of Chesterfield County by the City of Richmond in 1969. Known as “The Rocks” at the time, the park had a reputation for gang-related activity and violence, due to the lack of enforcement by law officials. Because of this, when the James River Park System was created in 1970, Pony Pasture was often ignored because it was seen as an area of high crime. Through the 1980s, the area was mostly occupied by the gangs The Pagans and The Hell's Angels because law enforcement only calmed extreme gang-activity and did not attempt to prevent it. Not until years later was the site finally claimed by park officials. Pony Pasture began a transformation from a high-crime area to a family-oriented place when the Park System took over some years later. It now has a reputation of not only being an easy access to the James River, but a place for other outdoor activities as well such as trail running, biking, and bird watching. According to park official Ralph White, “police are really no longer required on a full time weekend basis as long as the traffic crowding is handled by volunteers”.

== Rapids ==
Arguably the biggest attraction to Pony Pasture is the rapids. A class II, the rapids are part of the James River's main channel. With the aid of park volunteers and funding from area recycling projects, easy access was made to the rapids. The Park System helped to create the access to the rapids in order to ensure an easy place to raft, kayak, and canoe. The stairs that lead directly into the river are also fully equipped with a canoe launch, suitable for kayaks and rafts alike. Rafters will often start at Pony Pasture or even further up the James and venture until Belle Isle, one of Richmond's main river entrances. Access to the rapids is free, but rafting is prohibited if the water level is too high. Aside from Belle Isle, the majority of kayak, paddle, and raft trips that start at Pony Pasture typically end at Pipeline Rapids or Reedy Creek. The rapids are a very popular part of Pony Pasture and helped to establish the name “Pony Pasture Rapids”.

== Other attractions ==
Besides the rapids, Pony Pasture has become a breeding ground for outdoor activity in the Greater Richmond Region. During the Spring and Summer, it is not unlikely to see groups of people swimming in the James, due to the water's shallow level and warm temperature. Pony Pasture is also a popular fishing hole because it has bass and sunfish year around. Both running and walking the trails that follow the river's edge has become one of the more popular activities amongst residents in the area. Biking is also allowed on the trails. An area connected to Pony Pasture via the river trails called “The Wetlands” offers a less populated area to explore. The Wetlands has sandy beaches that line the river's edge and blinds for bird watching. Pony Pasture's most frequently-spotted animals are ducks, herons, turtles, and beavers. Pets are permitted throughout all of Pony Pasture, which is why it is not uncommon to see residents with their dogs on most days. Other activities include rock-climbing, nature study, photography, and picnicking.

== Williams Island ==
The stretch of 100-acre land across from Pony Pasture in the middle of the James River is Williams Island. The property is officially a part of the James River Park System, and the JRPS oversees and cares for the land, which gives people access to the island. Williams Island can be reached from Pony Pasture by way of swimming, kayaking, canoeing, or rock-hopping (when the water level is low). The island has become a popular destination amongst people due to the fact that is undeveloped, unpopulated, and generally perceived as a peaceful, quiet area. Like Pony Pasture, Williams Island is a suitable place for fishing, hiking, and animal-watching. According to James River Park manager Ralph White, the island has been home to many creatures such as albino deer, black bears, raccoons, skunk, muskrat, and wild turkey. The large dam, known as the “Z-dam” can be clearly seen from the island's south side. The Z-dam was built in 1905 and reconstructed in 1932. In 1993, a 30-foot indentation was created to allow migrating fish the ability to swim through the dam. The Z-dam causes the river to divide into two different channels (known as the “north channel” and the “south channel”) from both sides of the island. Williams Island was under the ownership of the City of Richmond Public Utilities Department, until the James River Park System was allowed to use it as a wildlife management refuge in 2012. In addition to Williams Island, the JRPS was given the rights to Lord Delaware's Island.
