= Huguenot Memorial Bridge =

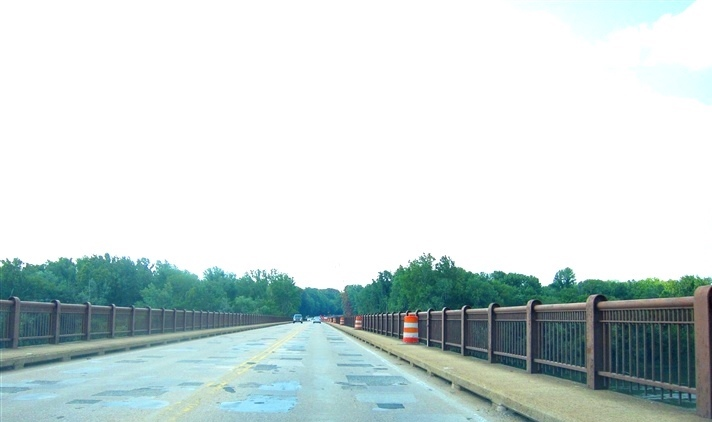
- Huguenot Memorial Bridge in 2014
- Coordinates: 37°33′42″N 77°32′38″W
- Carries: SR 147
- Crosses: James River
- Locale: Henrico, Virginia
- Official name: Huguenot Memorial Bridge
- Other name: Huguenot Bridge
- Maintained by: Virginia Department of Transportation

Characteristics
- Total length: 2900 ft (884 m)

History
- Constructed by: T. A. Loving Company
- Opened: 1950

Statistics
- Toll: none

Location
- Interactive map of Huguenot Memorial Bridge

Huguenot Memorial Bridge is located in Henrico County and the independent city of Richmond, Virginia. It carries State Route 147 across the former Chesapeake and Ohio Railway (now the James River Line of CSX Transportation), the James River and Kanawha Canal, and the James River in the Fall Line region above the head of navigation at Richmond.

The Huguenot Memorial Bridge, which connects Southside (Richmond, Virginia) to urban Richmond, was completed in 1950. The 2900 ft (884 m) span replaced the low-level Westham Bridge which had been built as a toll bridge in 1911. The old bridge was subject to flooding and was inadequate for traffic in the growing suburban area.

The Huguenot Memorial Bridge was named in honor of the French Huguenot settlers who came to the area in the 18th century to escape religious persecution in France. It is owned by the Virginia Department of Transportation (VDOT) and is the westernmost bridge over the James River in the metropolitan Richmond area that is open to pedestrians.

== History ==
Westham Bridge crossed the James River between Henrico County and Chesterfield County. The bridge was located between Bosher Dam and Williams Island Dam just west of the 7 miles of rapids and falls which constitute the fall line of the James River at Richmond, Virginia.

Built as a toll bridge in 1911, it was named for the nearby Westham Station of the Chesapeake and Ohio Railway near the north end. Also nearby at the north end were the remains of the James River and Kanawha Canal.

The privately held company which financed the bridge, Southampton Bridge Corporation, was headed by developer George Craghead Gregory, who also had plans to extend a streetcar line from an existing line at Westhampton Park (now the University of Richmond) to the suburban community of Bon Air. Originally developed as a popular resort, Bon Air had become a bedroom community of Richmond. Between the James River and Bon Air, Gregory controlled large land areas along the proposed rail line which he hoped to develop. However, despite his plans, aside from grading of right-of-way, Gregory's planned streetcar line did not materialize.

After 1933, State Route 147 was routed across the Westham Bridge. It connected River Road and Westham Parkway in Henrico with Southampton Road and the new Huguenot Road in Chesterfield.

In 1950, the Westham Bridge, which had been subject to flooding and was inadequate for traffic in the growing suburban area, was replaced by the new Huguenot Memorial Bridge.

The 1950 original bridge was facing significant structural issues. After years of problems maintaining the deck and pavement, as of 2008, a replacement was included in the limited number of high priority projects underway with the Virginia Department of Transportation (VDOT). Construction began in 2010 and completed in 2013.
