= Wilfred Emory Cutshaw =

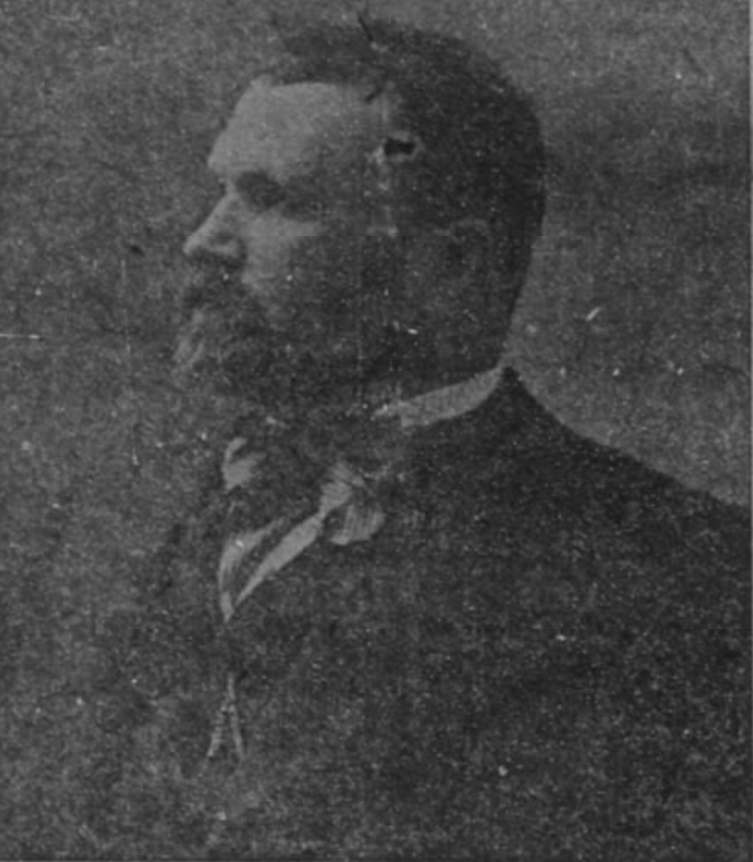
- Cutshaw, c. 1896
- Born: January 25, 1838; Harpers Ferry, Virginia, U.S.
- Died: December 19, 1907 (aged 69); Richmond, Virginia, U.S.
- Burial place: Hollywood Cemetery, Richmond, Virginia
- Education: Virginia Military Institute
- Military career
- Allegiance: Confederate States of America
- Branch: Confederate States Army
- Service years: 1861-1865
- Rank: Lt Colonel (CSA)
- Commands: Hardaway's Artillery Battalion
- Conflicts: American Civil War; First Battle of Winchester; Valley Campaign of 1862; Valley Campaigns of 1864; Battle of Sailor's Creek
- Other work: Engineer; teacher

Wilfred Emory Cutshaw (January 25, 1838 – December 19, 1907) was an American engineer and Virginia Military Institute graduate, who during the American Civil War rose to the rank of lieutenant colonel in the Confederate Army, then rebuilt Richmond, Virginia, during 34 years as city engineer of the state capital.

== Early life and career ==
Wilfred Emory Cutshaw was born in Harpers Ferry, in what during his lifetime became West Virginia, to George W. Cutshaw and his Alexandria-born wife Martha J. Moxley. Educated privately at home and a local academy, young Cutshaw studied civil and military engineering and graduated from the Virginia Military Institute in 1858. After teaching briefly in Loudoun County, he accepted a position in Hampton, Virginia, at the Hampton Academy, which had adopted the VMI model and was training young Virginians as military officers.

== American Civil War ==
As Virginia seceded in April 1861, Cutshaw resigned his teaching post to enlist in the Confederate Army, accepting a lieutenant's commission and initially serving as adjutant to his former principal at Hampton, now Confederate Major John B. Cary.

Cutshaw rose quickly through the ranks and gained considerable battle experience. (Hampton Military Academy never reopened; the city was burned under orders of Confederate General John B. Magruder on August 7, 1862).

Cutshaw gained combat experience under General Magruder on the Peninsula during the summer of 1861, then received a promotion to captain and led an artillery battalion in General Stonewall Jackson’s brigade during the Valley Campaign of 1862.

As 1862 began, Cutshaw received a promotion to captain of artillery, but during the First Battle of Winchester, he was shot in the knee and captured by Federal forces. Cutshaw was paroled in August 1862, but being medically unfit to serve, he briefly returned to teaching at Virginia Military Institute.

Still under parole in April 1863, Cutshaw was arrested near Charlestown, West Virginia (not far from where he grew up), under suspicion of being a spy and violating his parole. He spent only several weeks in captivity, however, and was exchanged at City Point, Virginia on May 5, 1863. He would spend the summer of 1863 recuperating in Richmond on furlough. He returned to active duty that September, serving as Assistant Inspector General for the Second Corps Artillery during the Bristoe and Mine Run Campaigns.

Cutshaw was promoted to major in February 1864, and assigned command of Hilary P. Jones' artillery battalion after that officer received promotion and was transferred to the Dept. of North Carolina and Southern Virginia. Cutshaw led the artillery battalion throughout the Overland Campaign.

Cutshaw then served under General Jubal Early during the Valley Campaigns of 1864, but missed the Third Battle of Winchester as he was raiding behind Federal lines in newly-established West Virginia.

In February 1865, he received his final promotion, to lieutenant colonel.

He received a severe leg wound during the Battle of Sailor's Creek, three days before General Robert E. Lee's surrender at Appomattox. Doctors saved Cutshaw's life, but amputated his leg.

== Richmond's City Engineer ==
Between 1865 and 1873, Cutshaw held several jobs, including professor at Virginia Military Institute and assistant to Charles P. Stone, engineer and superintendent of the Dover Coal and Iron Company.

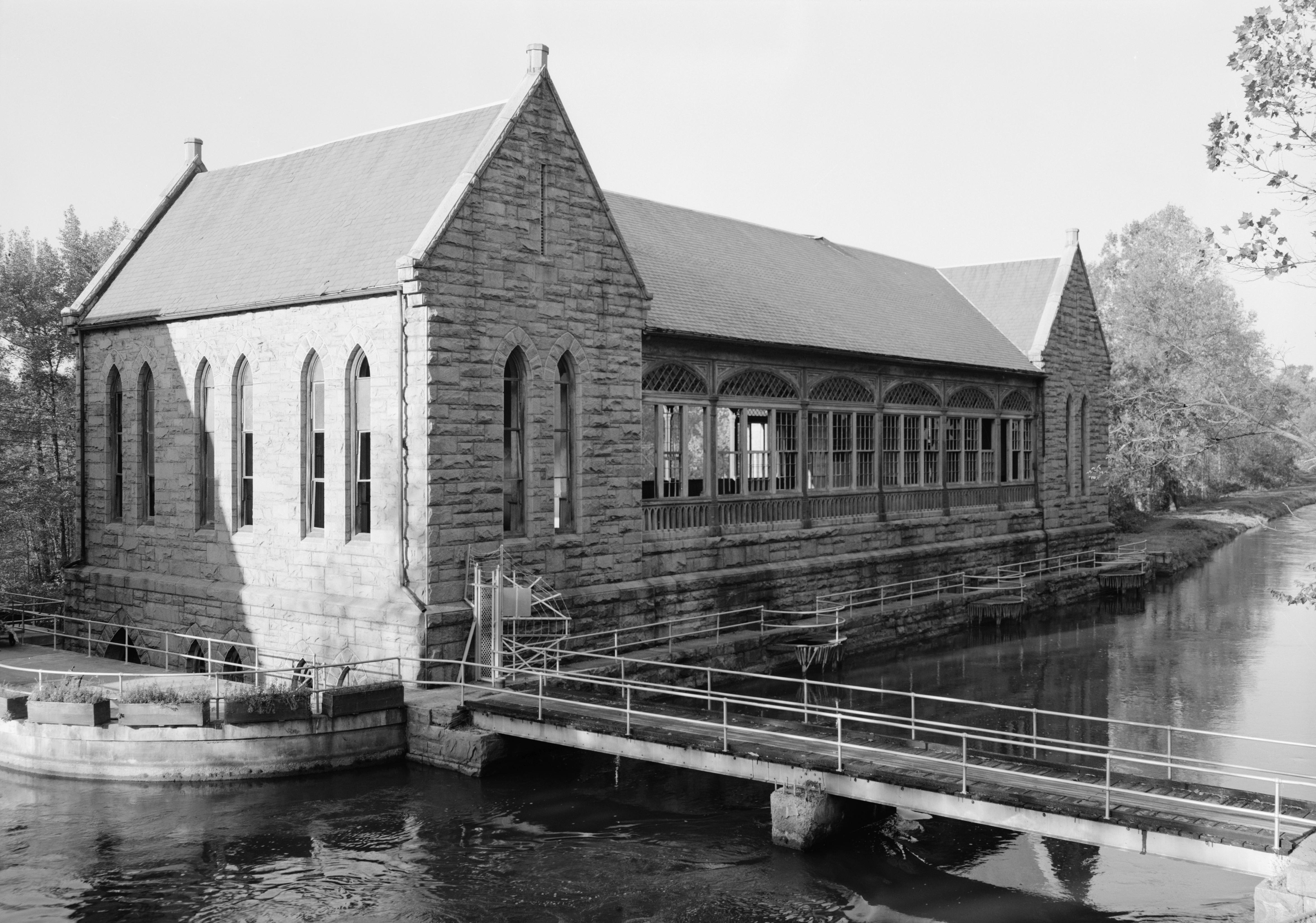
New Pump House, 1971.

When Richmond's city engineer (and former Confederate captain), Charles H. Dimmock, died in 1873, former General and Washington College President Robert E. Lee recommended Cutshaw as his successor. Cutshaw inherited a city still devastated by the war and for the next three decades devoted his efforts to renew the public infrastructure. He undertook numerous projects during his tenure, including the waterworks which pumped water from the James River and Kanawha Canal into the Byrd Park Reservoir, and was also heralded as a proponent of spaces for public recreation.

In 1879 Cutshaw embarked on a tour of northern United States and European parks and incorporated what he saw into plans and designs for public spaces in Richmond. Thus he brought the City Beautiful movement to Richmond, along with its ideals of urban beautification and civic grandeur. Among Cutshaw's important efforts are Monroe Park, the Boulevard, an urban nursery that provided for over 50,000 trees for the city, a public reservoir in Byrd Park, and conversion of hills into developable spaces and parks, including Libby, Gamble's, and Chimborazo Hills. Cutshaw oversaw projects on multiple scales and often with multiple uses. Not only did he oversee creation of the city's street grid and waterworks system, but he also oversaw significant architectural achievements, many in the then-popular gothic renewal style from locally quarried granite and which now are on the National Register of Historic Places. Among these were the Old City Hall finished in 1886 and the New Pump House of 1883 (to which the city's elite would arrive via boat for social events on the open-air second-story dance floor). Other public works erected during Cutshaw's tenure include fire stations, markets, schools, and armories. They exhibit a range of architectural styles. The architectural assistant in Cutshaw's office responsible for some of the design and documentation of these buildings, including the 1895 Howitzer's Battalion, was a young Henry E. Baskervill, founder and ancestor of one of Richmond's most prolific contemporary firms, Baskervill.

== Personal life and legacy ==
Cutshaw survived two wives and had no children. He first married in 1876 to E.S. Norfleet (who survived less than a year) and in 1890 married M.W. Morton (who also died within a year of marriage). He was buried in Hollywood Cemetery.

Cutshaw's engineering and social contributions were recognized during his lifetime. He was elected a member of the American Society of Civil Engineers in 1891. He was also active in Confederate Veterans organizations, the Royal Arcanum, Southern Historical Society, Virginia Historical Society and Richmond YMCA, as well as president of Virginia Military Institute Alumni. A plaque inside Richmond's Old City Hall notes his contributions. In 2015, the Virginia Department of Historic Resources erected a sign memorializing Cutshaw's civic contributions in Byrd Park in front of the round house, 621 Westover Road.
