= Manchester Wall =

Rock climbing area in Richmond, Virginia

Coordinates: 37.529602°N 77.445913°W

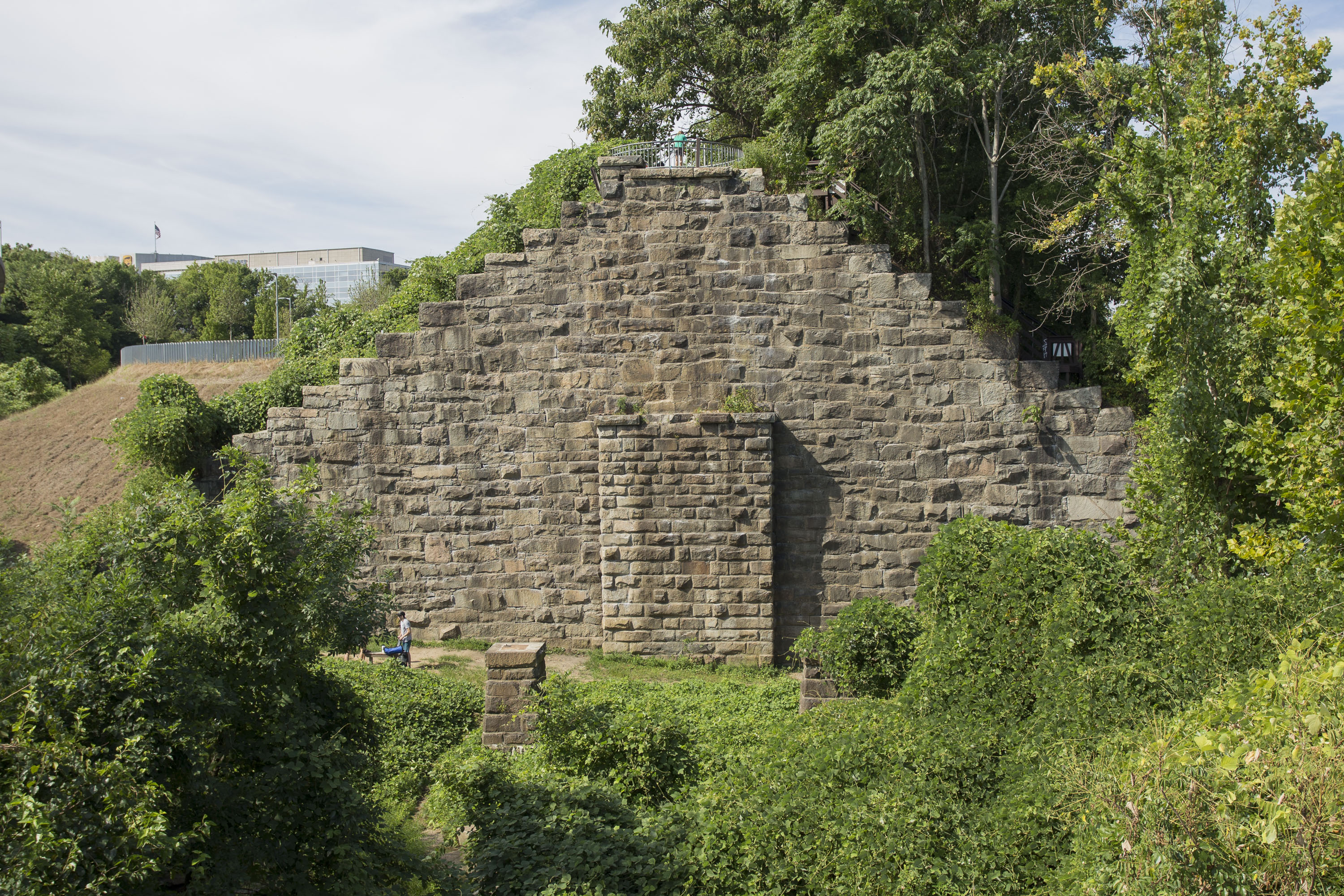
Main wall

Manchester Wall is a rock climbing area located in Manchester, Richmond, Virginia that offers multiple routes for traditional climbing, sport climbing, and top roping. The sixty-foot granite wall is a remnant of the Richmond and Petersburg Railroad Bridge, which spanned the James River for much of the nineteenth century. The climbing area is located in the James River Park on the south side of the James River and is accessible by foot from the north via Brown's Island and the T. Tyler Potterfield Memorial Bridge.

== Routes and Difficulty ==
Manchester has a total of 43 routes, ranging from the difficulty of 5.4 to 5.11a, most averaging around 5.9.

The easiest route at Manchester is located on the back of the first pillar (i.e. side closest to the James River). This route is affectionately called The Ladder, or Potty Training, and is rated a 5.4. However, it is recommended to have an experience climber lead Bolts From Heaven, a 5.5 with arete on. The lead climber can then send a top rope down The Ladder from the anchors at the top of the pillar.

Bolts From Heaven is often used as a practice run for climbers learning to lead. Having a total of 7 bolts, plus the two top bolts, makes it the safest first lead at Manchester. Also, this climb is used for anchoring any of the other 8 routes on Pillar #1 with relative ease. The other routes on the pillar have fewer bolts for sport climbing, making a ground-fall more likely should a mistake be made.

Pillar #2. McKenna, or The Crack, is literally a crack running up the pillar. It offers a variety of handholds such as crimpers, side-pulls, and under-clings. It has reliable footholds, so it is used by climbers getting practice with different clings.

The Wall is where the most effort is put forward into climbing. The pillars have a slightly sloped incline, making balancing and standing much easier for climbers. However, The Wall is an almost vertical ascent. It also makes the effort more difficult because of its much longer route lengths. The pillars are relatively short compared to the towering wall.

The highest graded route on The Wall is Tendonitis, rated at 5.10d. The route is defined by a smooth surface and lack of foot- and handholds. The first half of Tendonitis is a chimney, at the top of which is a location for climbers to sit and rest before continuing up the other half to the top-most point on the wall. Further technical sections in this route often limit climbers to finger pockets and smearing on the wall.

== The Wall ==
- Total Routes: 20
- Lowest Rating: 5.4 (Gutter Ball, arete on, top rope)
- Highest rating: 5.10d (Tendonitis, sport/top rope)
- Easiest Lead: No need to lead for most of these, there is a path going up to the top of the wall for hikers. Climbers can reach over the edge to most anchors.

== Pillar #1 ==
- Total Routes: 9
- Lowest Rating: 5.4 (Potty Training/The Ladder, arete on, top rope/trad gear)
- Highest Rating: 5.7 (Voodoo Doll, arete off, sport(2 bolts)/top rope)
- Easiest Lead: 5.5 (Bolts From Heaven, arete on, 7 bolts)

== Pillar #2 ==
- Total Routes: 8
- Lowest Rating: 5.8+ (Crown of Thorns, arete off, top rope/trad gear)
- Highest Rating: 5.11a (Nemesis, arete off, sport(2 bolts)/top rope)
- Easiest Lead: 5.8+ (McKenna/The Crack, 2 bolts)

== Pillar #3 ==
Pillar #3 was previously only traditional gear accessible. However, as of July 2006, bolts have been placed, so it can probably now be sport climbed. Until climbing is regular on this pillar, though, it will be treated with traditional gear only routes and ratings.

- Total Routes: 6
- Lowest Rating: 5.8+ (Cary's Route, arete off, trad gear only)
- Highest Rating: 5.10c (Blair Witch, arete off, trad gear only)
- Easiest Lead: Unknown
