= Westham Bridge =

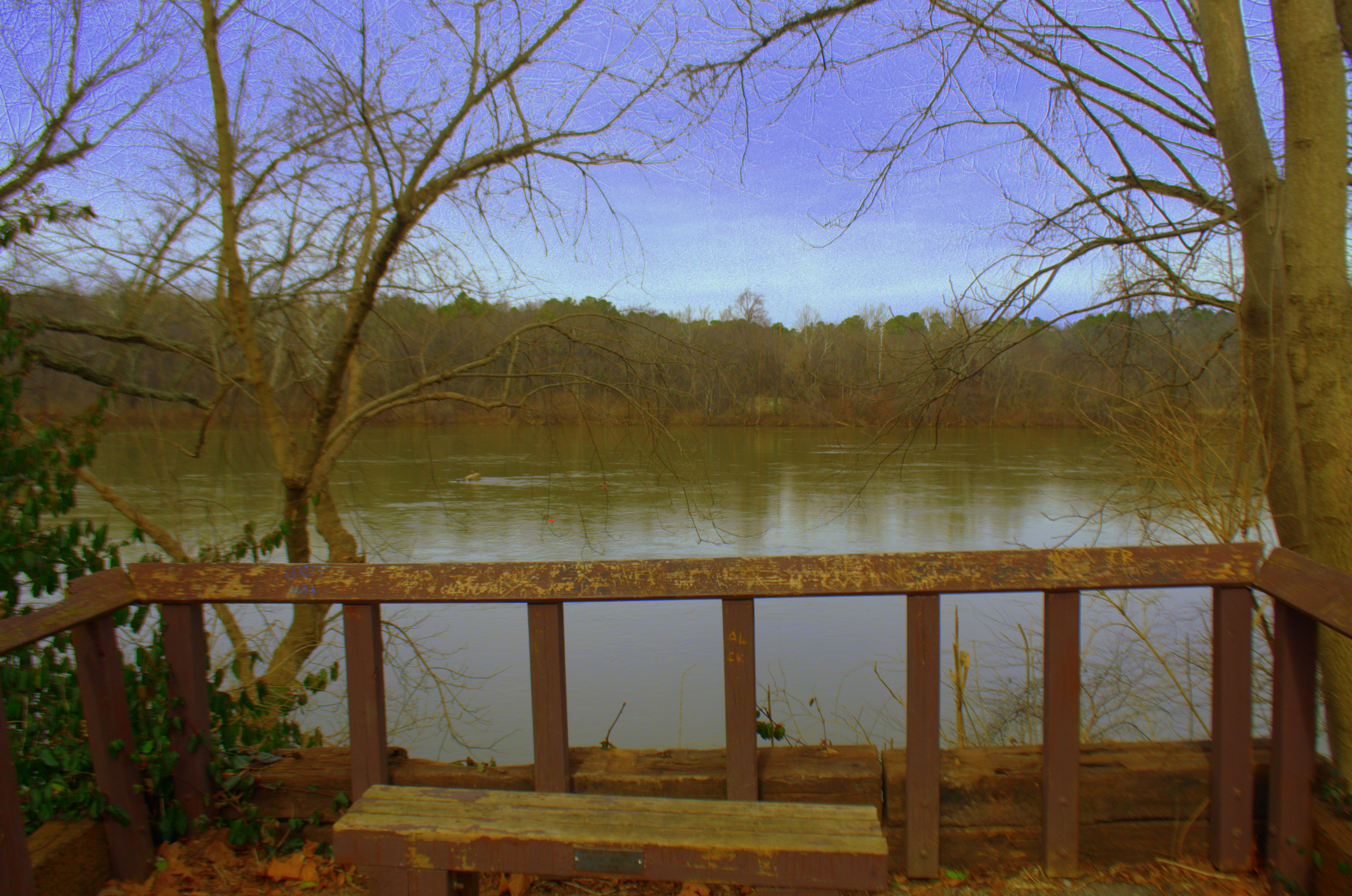
- Westham Bridge - Looking toward the North Pylon from the South Pylon
- Coordinates: 37°33′42″N 77°32′48″W
- Carries: SR 147
- Crosses: James River
- Locale: Chesterfield, Virginia; Henrico, Virginia
- Official name: Westham Bridge
- Maintained by: Southampton Bridge Corporation

History
- Opened: 1911
- Closed: 1950

Statistics
- Toll: Yes

Location
- Interactive map of Westham Bridge

Westham Bridge crossed the James River between Henrico County and Chesterfield County. The bridge was located between Bosher Dam and Williams Island Dam just west of the 7 miles of rapids and falls which constitute the fall line of the James River at Richmond, Virginia.

Built as a toll bridge in 1911, it was named for the nearby Westham Station of the Chesapeake and Ohio Railway near the north end. Also nearby at the north end were the remains of the James River and Kanawha Canal.

The privately held company which financed the bridge, Southampton Bridge Corporation, was headed by developer George Craghead Gregory, who also had plans to extend a streetcar line from an existing line at Westhampton Park (now the University of Richmond) to the suburban community of Bon Air. Originally developed as a popular resort, Bon Air had become a bedroom community of Richmond. Between the James River and Bon Air, Gregory controlled large land areas along the proposed rail line which he hoped to develop. However, despite his plans, aside from grading of right-of-way, Gregory's planned streetcar line did not materialize.

After 1933, State Route 147 was routed across the Westham Bridge. It connected River Road and Westham Parkway in Henrico with Southampton Road and the new Huguenot Road in Chesterfield.

In 1950, the Westham Bridge, which had been subject to flooding and was inadequate for traffic in the growing suburban area, was replaced by the new Huguenot Memorial Bridge, named in honor of the French Huguenot settlers who came to the area in the 18th century to escape religious persecution in France.

The old bridge was dismantled, but the abutments for it remained visible at each end, and overhead power and telephone lines continued to mark the route. Traces of the old streetcar right-of-way may be seen along gently sloped Southampton Road and on Hazen Street in Bon Air. Gregory's old mansion, Granite Hall, now surrounded by a subdivision near Williams Island Dam, was still in use as a private residence in 2008. The C&O's Westham Station was relocated to a Richmond city park in 1961.
