= J. T. Haxall =

American football player (1860–1939)

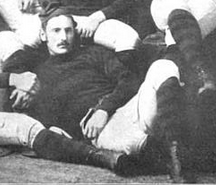

Profile
- Position: Guard/Kicker

Personal information
- Born: April 22, 1860; Virginia, U.S.
- Died: July 9, 1939 (aged 79); Maryland, U.S.
- Listed weight: 158 lb (72 kg)

Career information
- College: Princeton (1881–1882)

Awards and highlights
- National championship, 1881; Longest field goal (65 yards)

John Triplett "Jerry" Haxall (April 22, 1860 – July 9, 1939) was a college football player. On November 30, 1882, he kicked a 65-yard field goal from placement (Note: The spectators did not measure the distance, but it was long estimated as 65 yards and by all accounts was beyond midfield.) for a then record in the Princeton–Yale contest at the Polo Grounds. The record stood until 1976. Haxall later remarked "My epitaph will probably be: J. T. Haxall. Kicked a football. That's all."

== Early life ==
John Triplett Haxall was born in Virginia on April 22, 1860 to Bolling Walker Haxall and Anne Triplett. His father was a flour milling heir whose Richmond house built in 1858 is on the National Register of Historic Places.
