= New Pump House =

- U.S. National Register of Historic Places
- Virginia Landmarks Register
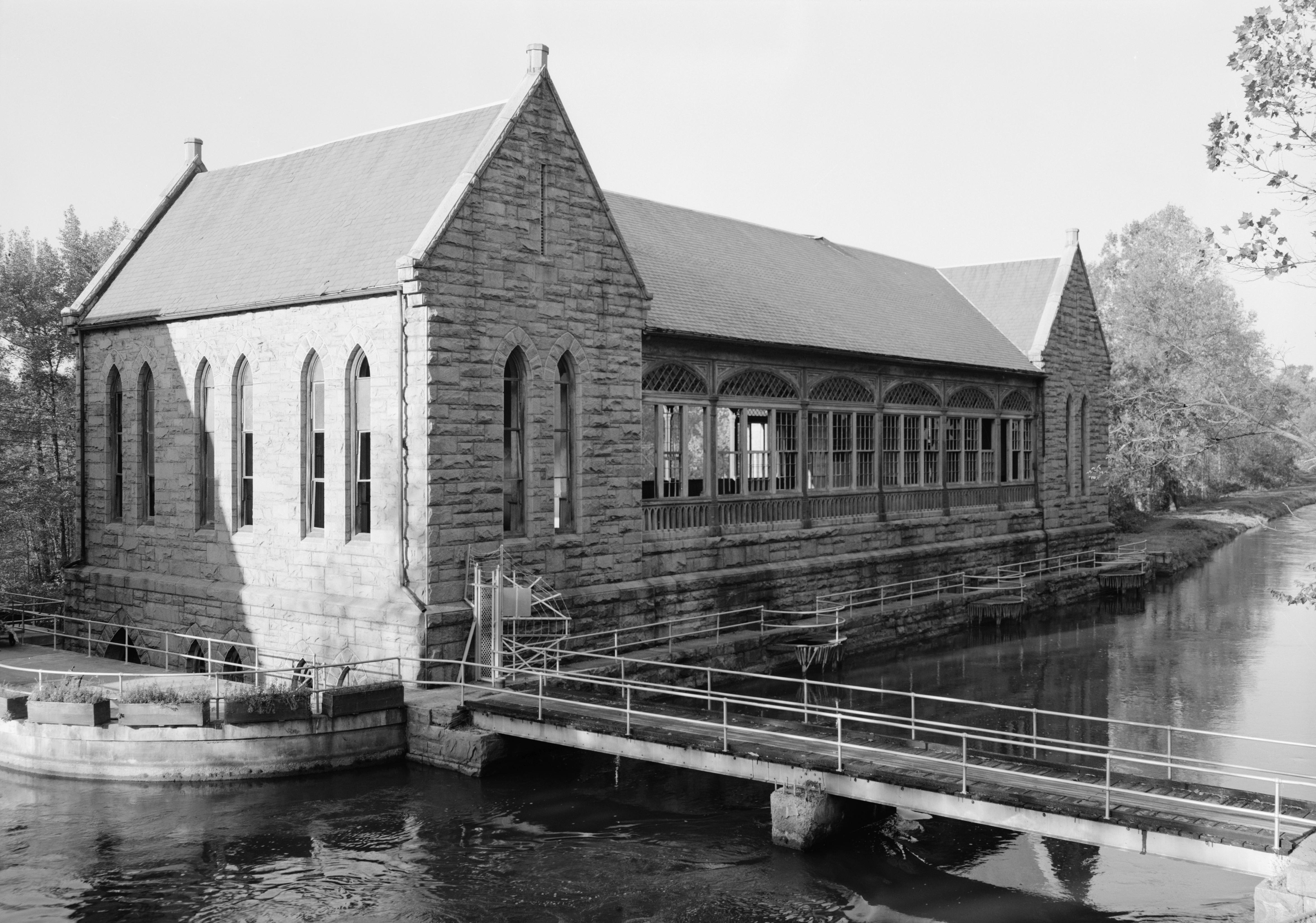
- New Pump House, HAER Photo, 1971

- Location within Virginia Location within the United States
- Location: Pump House Park; 1708 Pump House Dr. Richmond, Virginia
- Coordinates: 37°32′8″N 77°29′7″W
- Area: 2 acres (0.81 ha)
- Built: 1881-1883, 1905
- Architect: Wilfred Emory Cutshaw
- Engineer: Wilfred Emory Cutshaw; Charles E. Bolling
- Architectural style: Gothic Revival, Beaux Arts, et al.
- Website: Friends of Pump House
- NRHP reference No.: 02001366
- VLR No.: 127-0193

Significant dates
- Began operation: May 4, 1883
- Ceased operation: August 31, 1924
- Added to NRHP: November 21, 2002
- Designated VLR: September 11, 2002

The New Pump House, also known as the Byrd Park Pump House, is a historic pumping station that served the city of Richmond, Virginia from 1883 to 1924.

== Description ==
Constructed between 1881 and 1883, the building is a three-part, "I" plan, Gothic Revival style granite structure. It features a steeply pitched roof, projecting gables, Gothic arches, and lancet windows. A one-story, L-shaped annex containing a coal-fired boiler, a hydroelectric turbine, and steam-powered generator was added in 1905. Unusually, the building features a large open-air ballroom on its second floor.

Also on the property are the contributing Beaux Arts style 1924 Hydro Electric Pumping Station constructed of brick, concrete, and stucco and the 1881 Worthington Steam Pump Building, a one-story Italianate style pump house built of brick coated with stucco. The complex was built as the waterworks for the city of Richmond.

It was listed on the National Register of Historic Places and the Virginia Landmarks Register in 2002.

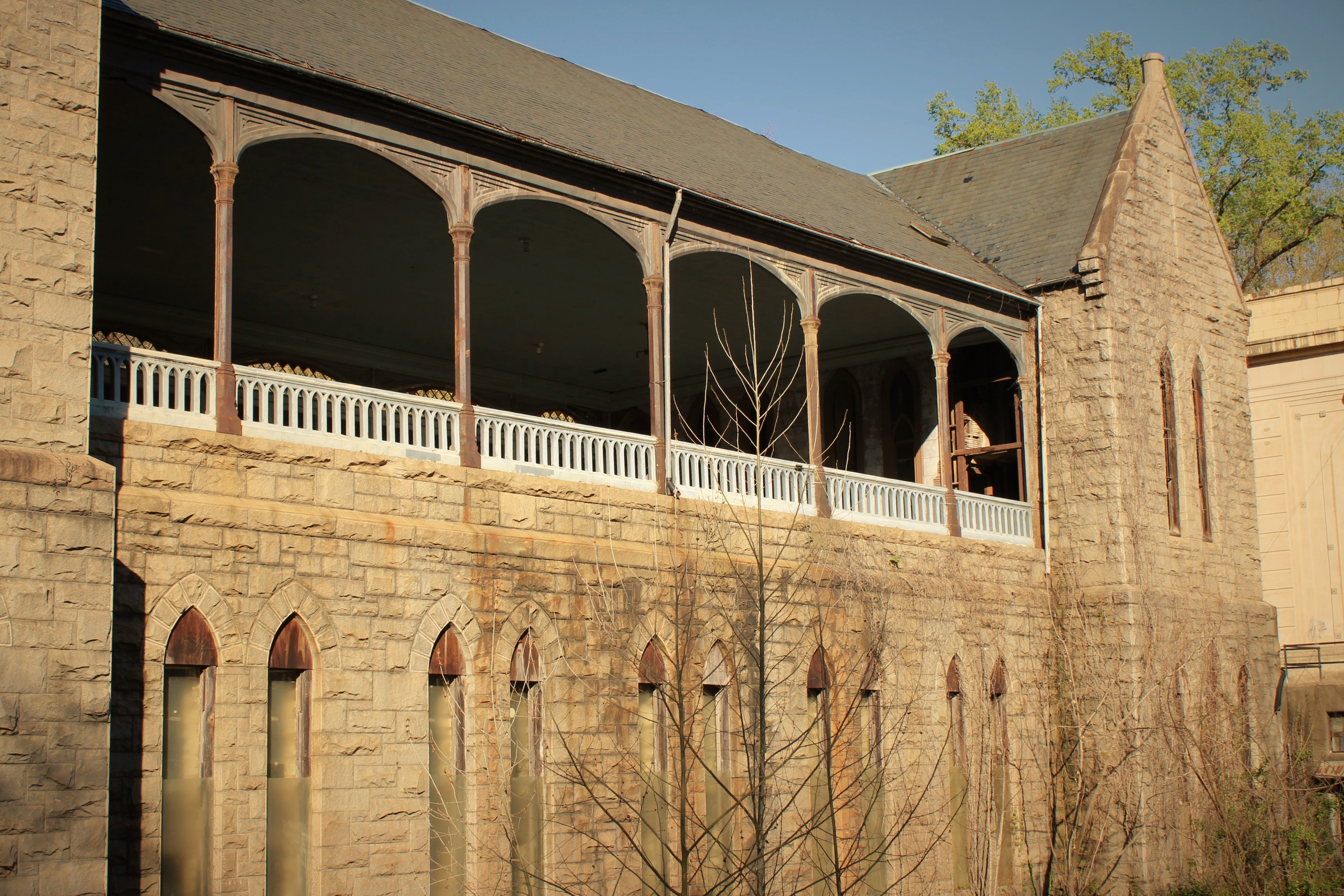
South elevation, showing the open-air pavilion

== History ==
A public water system for Richmond was originally proposed in 1828 and a plan developed by Albert Stein was approved in 1830. As part of this plan, a water-driven pump house was constructed at the west end of Tredegar Street. It was completed in 1832 and supplied the Marshall Reservoir (located at what is now Clark Springs Elementary School) until 1909.

Increasing demand for water and fears of contamination from nearby cemeteries led to the construction of a new 55-million gallon reservoir starting in 1874 and ending in 1876. That reservoir, located in present-day Byrd Park, is still in use as of 2025. Later, in 1880, the city council authorized the issuance of $400,000 in bonds to pay for the construction of a new pump house.

=== Operation ===
The New Pump House, as it was then known, was first tested on June 29, 1882. City officials and dignitaries observed the test, arriving via a special train chartered for their trip. Work on the building continued for another year, and the building officially began operations on May 4, 1883.

Due to its location at the Three-Mile Locks of the James River and Kanawha Canal, the New Pump House was designed to use the available hydraulic power to drive its machinery. Originally, this was achieved using partial vertical turbines, though these were later replaced by Leffel turbines in 1891. Three turbines powered three sets of piston pumps capable of moving 12,000,000 US gallons (45,000,000 L; 10,000,000 imp gal) of water per day to the nearby reservoir, an elevation of approximately 170 feet (52 m).

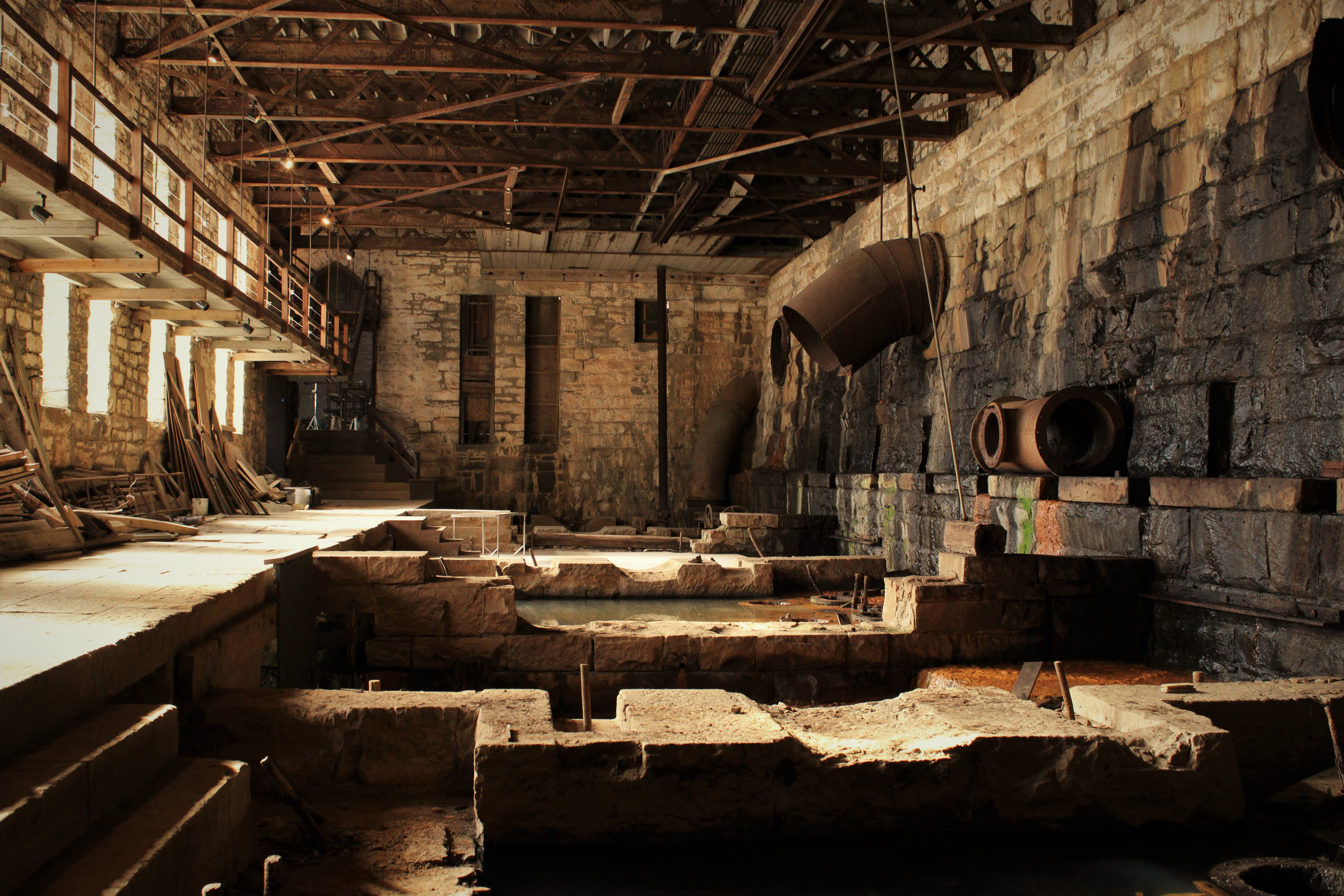
Pump Room

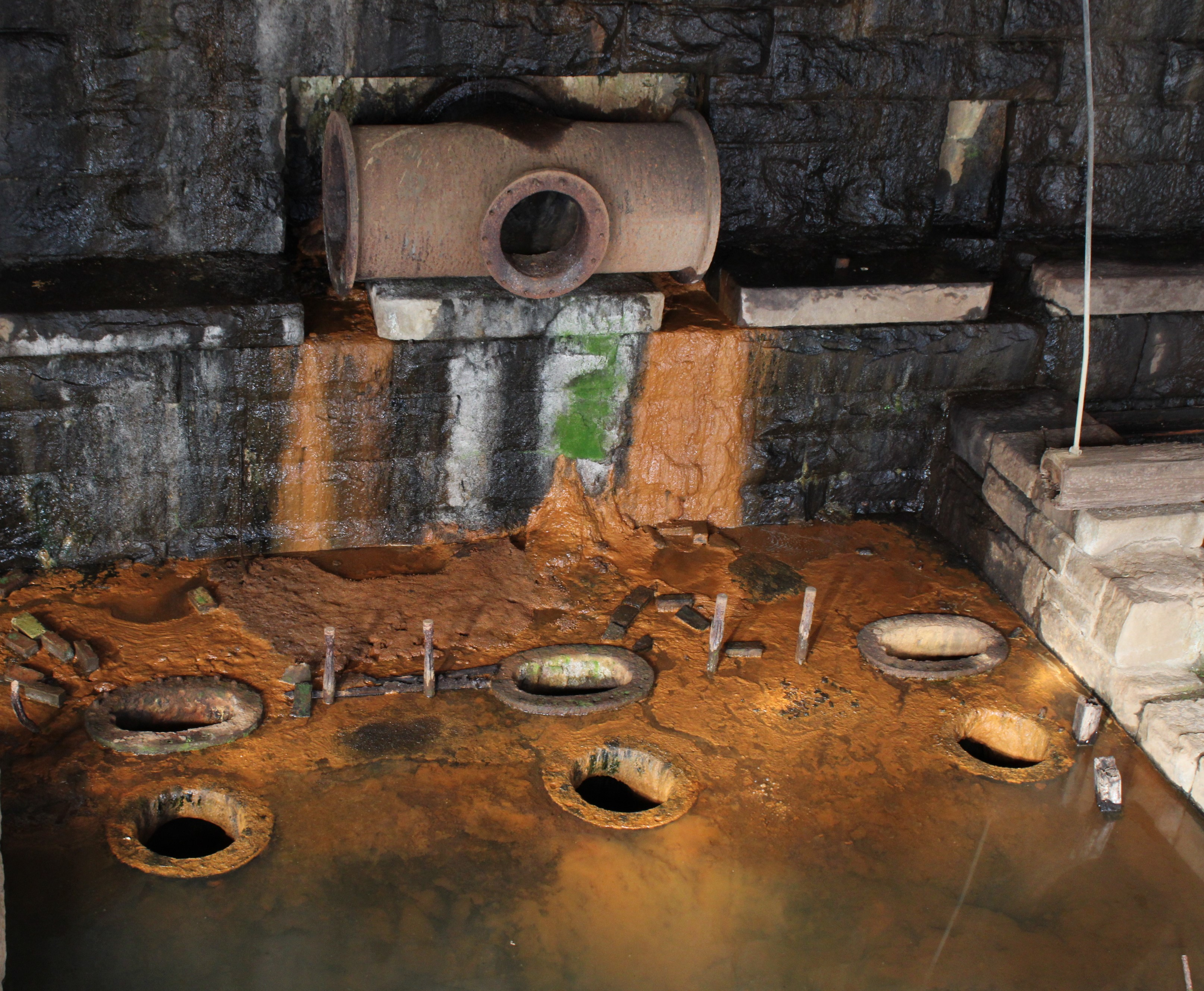
Pump flanges for one set of triplex piston pumps.

Originally, the drinking water distributed by the New Pump House was taken directly from the James River and underwent very little treatment aside from passing through settling basins located upstream. Richmond would not begin chlorinating its drinking water until 1913.

=== Social Venue ===
The New Pump House was designed with a covered, open-air pavilion on its second floor, which was later enclosed in 1899 to prevent the infiltration of rain. Several dances and social events were held in the building over the years of the building's operation, and it was possible to travel to the building via mule-driven canal boat.

=== 1905 Annex ===
A two-room addition to the building was completed in 1905. This annex contained a coal-fired Babcock & Wilcox boiler which supplied steam used to drive a 250-kW alternating current generator in the adjacent room. The steam was also used to prevent the pumping machinery from freezing up during periods of cold weather. A 250-kW hydroelectric generator was also added at this time. Electricity generated at the New Pump House was used for lighting and powering additional pumping equipment closer to the reservoir.

=== Abandonment ===
Advances in technology made the building's pumping machinery obsolete, and it was replaced by the adjacent hydroelectric pumping station on September 1, 1924. The pumping machinery would later be sold for scrap shortly before World War II. The city of Richmond planned to demolish the structure in the 1950's, but later sold it to First Presbyterian Church for $1. Ownership eventually reverted back to the city, where it remains today.

== Revitalization ==
Attempts at revitalizing the building have occurred since at least 2001. In 2017, Joseph Costello, an urban planning master's degree student at Virginia Commonwealth University founded the Friends of Pump House as part of his thesis project. The organization performs needed repairs and advocates for the building's revitalization, in addition to leading tours and hosting other special events. Since 2021, they have overseen the restoration of many of the building's original windows and have announced plans to replace the aging slate roof.

== Cultural references ==
The New Pump House has served as a filming location for both television and cinema in addition to music videos. The building features in the opening minutes of the 2025 film Saturnalia. A short fantasy film, Hill of the Hapersnoks was also filmed in and around the building. Both the Sugar Hollows and Inter Arma have filmed music videos in the upstairs ballroom and pump room, respectively.
