= Westham station =

Coordinates: 37°34′26.3″N 77°27′46.3″W

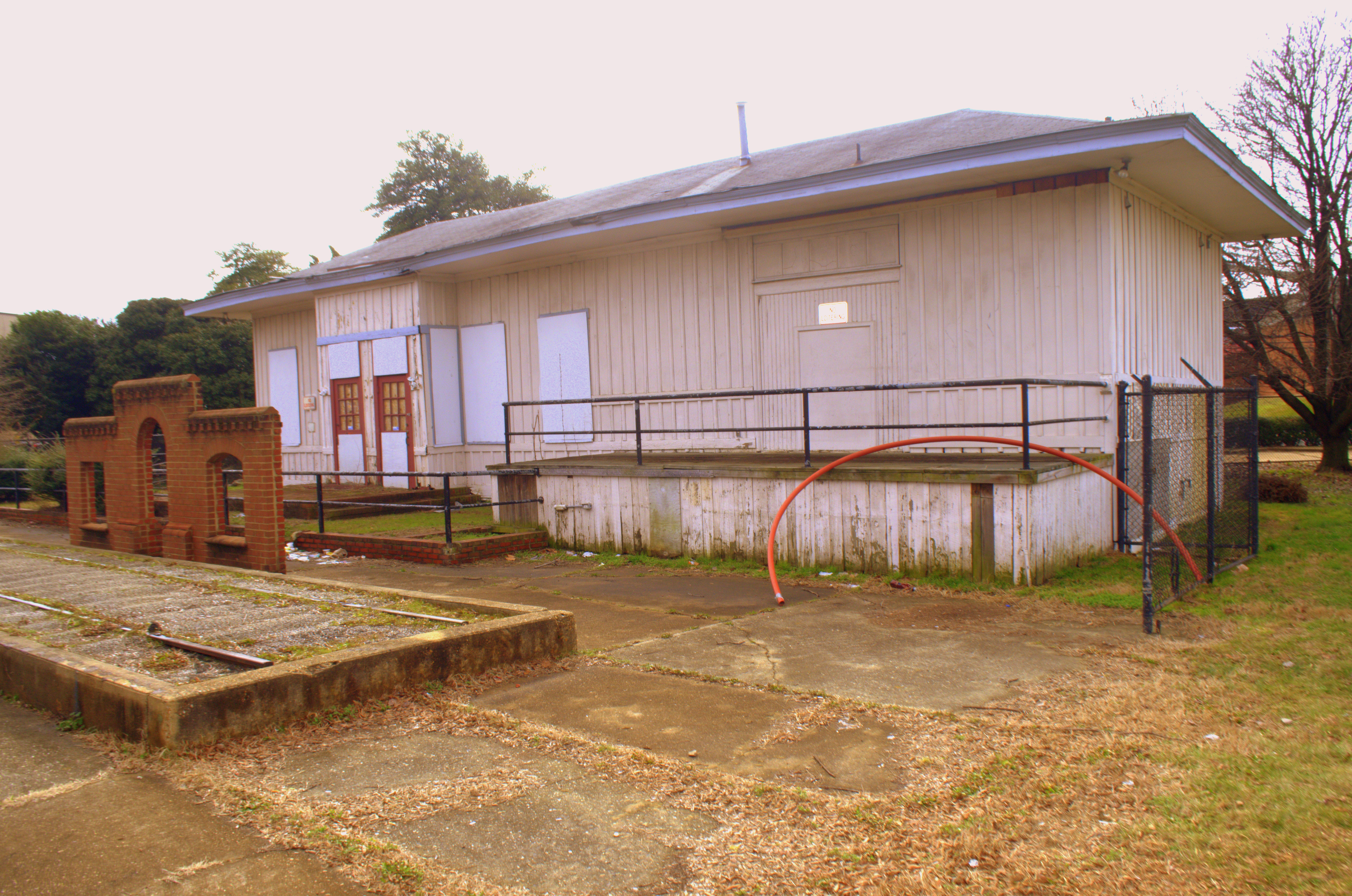
This is Westham station that was moved to a city park. The park is the Parker Field Annex in Richmond, Virginia.

Westham Station in Henrico County, Virginia, USA, was originally located at Westham on the Richmond and Allegheny Railroad (R&A), which was laid along the towpath of the James River and Kanawha Canal in the 1880s. The R&A railroad was acquired by the Chesapeake and Ohio Railway (C&O) in the 1890s. Westham station was built in 1911, near the Westham Bridge, which spans the James River. The station was heated by a coal stove and had a telegraph for communication through the 1950s.

C&O's Westham station was relocated to a Richmond city park on the intersection of Robin Hood Road and Hermitage Road in 1961.

Preceding station	Chesapeake and Ohio Railway	Following station
Lorraine toward Clifton Forge	Richmond and Alleghany Railroad	Korah toward Richmond
