= Bolling Walker Haxall =

Bolling Walker Haxall (July 18, 1814 – June 26, 1885) was an American flour milling heir and farmer who was president of Old Dominion Iron and Steel Works. He had the Bolling Haxall House built in Richmond, Virginia, in 1858. Haxall was the owner Richmond's Haxall Flour Mills, one of the largest flour mills in the world at that time, which made him one of the Richmond's wealthiest and most prominent businessmen before the Civil War. Bolling Walker Haxall also founded Christ Episcopal Church in Gordonsville, Virginia, which held its first service on October 10, 1875.

His niece was Charlotte Taylor Haxall Lee (1848-1871) who was married to Robert E. Lee Jr., the son of Civil War general Robert E. Lee. His son was Princeton football player J. T. Haxall (1860–1939) who was known for kicking a 65-yard field goal against Yale in 1882.
