= Bosher's Dam =

Coordinates: 37°33′36″N 77°34′33″W

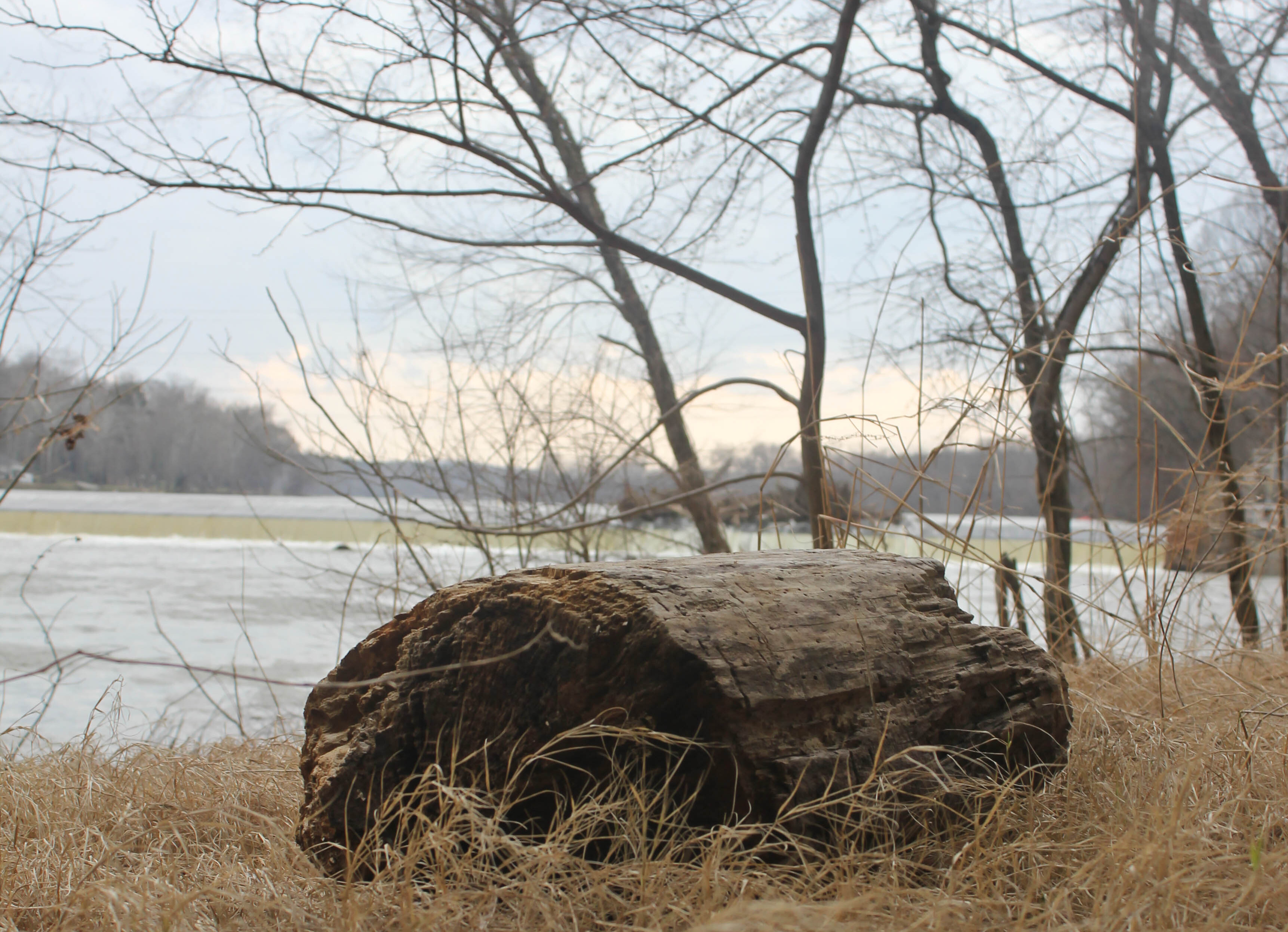
- A bank of the James River, with Bosher's Dam in background.
- Interactive map of Bosher's Dam
- Location: Henrico County, Virginia
- Purpose: Navigation, Water Supply
- Status: In use
- Opening date: 1840
- Owner: City of Richmond, Virginia
- Operator: City of Richmond, Virginia

Dam and spillways
- Type of dam: Concrete gravity
- Impounds: James River
- Height: 10 ft (3.0 m)

Power Station
- Operator: City of Richmond, Virginia

Bosher's Dam is a historic low head dam (also called a weir) built upon the James River just west of Richmond, Virginia. It is a 12-foot-high stone structure which interrupts the natural flow of Virginia's largest self-contained river by spanning the waterway between suburban Tuckahoe in Henrico County and the western part of Richmond just west of the Edward E. Willey Bridge. Such dams are often referred to as "drowning machines" by paddlers due to their dangerous nature. Bosher's Dam is not an exception and has caused a number of deaths.

== History ==
The structure dates to 1835 at the location of an earlier dam designed to catch fish between slats. The current iteration was part of construction of the James River and Kanawha Canal, a major 19th Century transportation project whose emphasis in 1835 was getting boat traffic around the Falls of the James, the boulder-strewn whitewater that blocked river transport for at least ten miles around Richmond. The dam may have provided power for nearby gristmills and provided sufficient water depth to the Canal flowing on what eventually became a 22-mile pathway as it weaves above the north shore of the James around the Falls.

== Recent developments ==
In recent years, hundreds of lowhead dams have been removed from American rivers to restore the spawning grounds of native fish. Nearby removals have occurred in Charlottesville and in Fredericksburg.

Such fish as shad, herring, and striped bass—which make their migratory spawning runs between March and early June—had been blocked by Bosher's, which made migration impossible for at least 300 miles upstream in the James, the Rivanna River, and other tributaries. The dam gets water into the Canal, which is of historic interest. It has also created conditions to make this section of the James suitable for powerboating with waterskiing and other activities typically available only on lakes and larger waterways. The Virginia Department of Game and Inland Fisheries built a 17-inch-wide fish ladder aside the dam.

== Future ==
With the 10 acres north of the dam belonging to the James River Park System, an opportunity exists to create more public access to this scenic area. Whether such parties as the neighbors along upscale Cherokee Road and Riverside Drive, as well as the Virginia Power Boat Association, will favor such an effort remains unknown. The dam would be retrofitted with a turbine to generate electricity. The proposed project would consist of: the existing 12-foot-high dam; a 1,000-acre impoundment with a storage capacity of 2,100 acre-feet and drainage area of 6,753 square miles; a new 700-foot-long, 180-foot-wide intake; a new 300-foot-long, 180-foot-wide tailrace; four new 2-MW turbines; a new 65-foot-long, 197-foot-wide powerhouse; a new 60-foot-long, 50-foot-wide substation; and a new 528-foot-long, 69-kV transmission line. The estimated annual generation of the project would be 68,500 MWh.

One Richmond-area news source has posed the question: "Should a park be created at Bosher's Dam?"

== Incidents at Bosher's ==
Because low head dams can be nearly invisible to people on boats, giving an impression similar to the edge of an infinity pool, boaters can encounter them inadvertently. Lowhead dams can be particularly hazardous because they tend to create "hydraulics," currents that push objects (and people) underwater and then inextricably cycle them for hours, days, or weeks until the water level changes.

- July 17, 1988 - Lisa Everett Cavanaugh, 20 - killed when a boat she was a passenger on ran over the dam.
- May 26, 1989 - Kari Karte, 22 - uninjured when her boat went over the dam.
- February 20, 1994 - Robert Michael Green, 15 - drowned when he slipped from the dam.
- May 30, 1997 - Janet Heath, 25 - injured when her waterski went over the dam.
- May 30, 2022 - Lauren E. Winstead, 23, and Sarah E. Erway, 28 - killed after twelve people went over the dam.
