= James River Park System =

Park system in Richmond, Virginia

Coordinates: 37.53°N 77.48°W

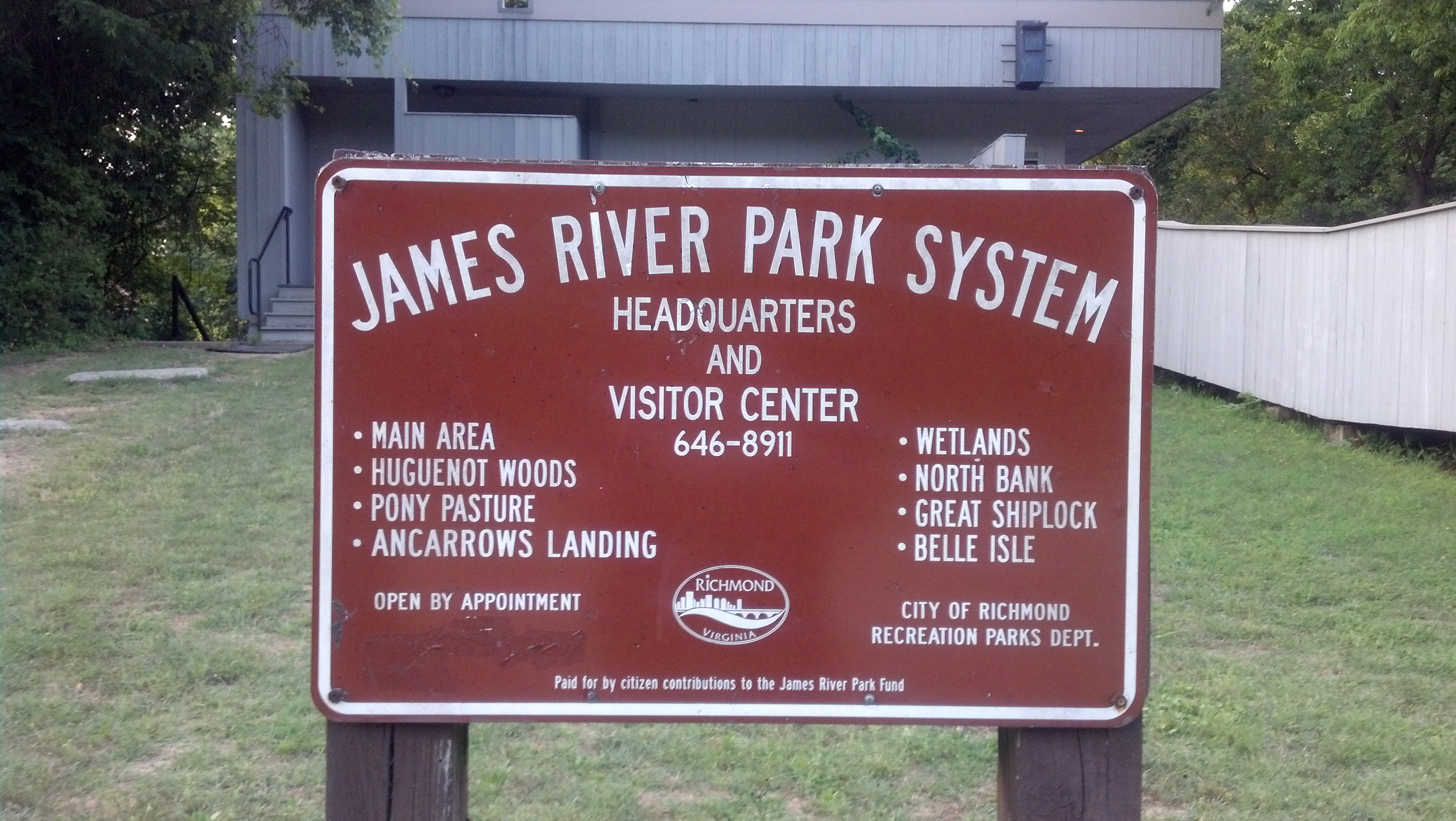
Sign at James River Park System headquarters

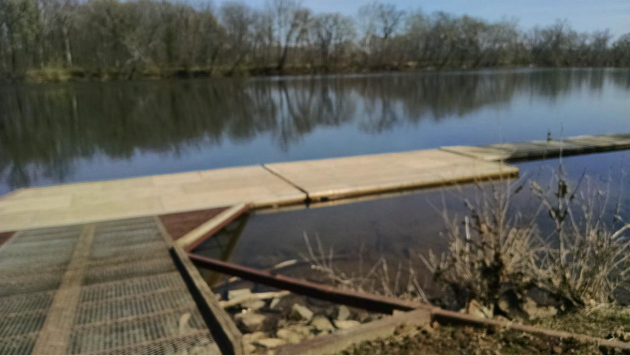
Floating dock on the James River

The James River Park System (also known as James River Park or simply JRPS) is a 600-acre (240 ha) municipal park in Richmond, Virginia. It consists of multiple sections along the James River between the Huguenot Memorial Bridge in the west to a half mile (0.8 km) beyond the I-95 Bridge over the James in the east. It is a part of the city’s Department of Parks, Recreation and Community Facilities.

== History ==
JRPS was formed by the City of Richmond in 1972 from a number of private properties that had been donated.

=== First Land Donation ===
The first property donated was a 380-acre tract obtained and donated to the city in 1966 by scout leader Charles Joseph “Joe” Schaefer. Schaefer had tried in vain to seek permission for his scouts to camp on a James River Island in 1965, and in the process, he and his former VMI roommate sought to find and secure a two-mile tract of river property to donate to the city as a public park.

=== Creation of the JRPS in 1972 ===
Ralph White, a former Peace Corps volunteer and National Park Service employee, was hired by the City of Richmond in 1980 as one of several JRPS employees. At the time the river was not in good condition, owing to littering and years of industrial use of the river White eventually became the manager of JRPS and spent a 32-year career with the city of Richmond, transforming JRPS through advocacy and engaging community groups in volunteer cleanups. In December 2012, White retired and was replaced by Nathan Burrell.

== 2009 Conservation Easement ==
In May 2009, a conservation easement was placed on parcels of the James River Park System. The Virginia Department of Conservation and Recreation, the Capitol Region Land Conservancy and the EnRichmond Foundation (formerly the Richmond Recreation and Parks Foundation) are the conservation easement holders. This open space and conservation easement, in general, restricts all future development in each parcel, although it does allow for regular maintenance and replacement in kind by the City of Richmond’s Department of Parks, Recreation, and Community Facilities

== Sections ==
The number of sections of the park have expanded over time. Some sources say there are currently 19 sections. From west to east, sections include the following areas:

- Huguenot Flatwater

This connects to the stretch of the James that runs from Bosher's Dam in the west to Z Dam in the east. It is a place for kayaking, canoeing, and paddleboarding. Nash's Island and Channing's Island, just below Bosher's and just above the Willey Bridge, are spots to beach and chill. A sandy beach is opposite the Flatwater put in. Other islands are just above Z Dam. The fish ladder in Z Dam is a place for kayaking and for paddle board surfing when the river is high.

- Pony Pasture Rapids
- The Wetlands
- Main Area (includes 43rd St., Buttermilk Trail, Reedy Creek Park Headquarters, and 22nd St. with pedestrian access to Belle Isle.
- Manchester Climbing Wall
- Ancarrow's Landing/Manchester Docks
- Pumphouse Park and North Bank Trailhead near Byrd Park
- Texas Beach/North Bank Trail near Maymont park
- Access to Belle Isle via the Belle Isle Pedestrian Bridge
- Tredegar St. Put-In
- Pipeline (or Trestle) Trail with views of heron rookery
- Great Shiplock Park/Chapel Island
