= Bolling Haxall House =

Historic house in Virginia, United States

- U.S. National Register of Historic Places
- Virginia Landmarks Register
- Richmond City Historic District
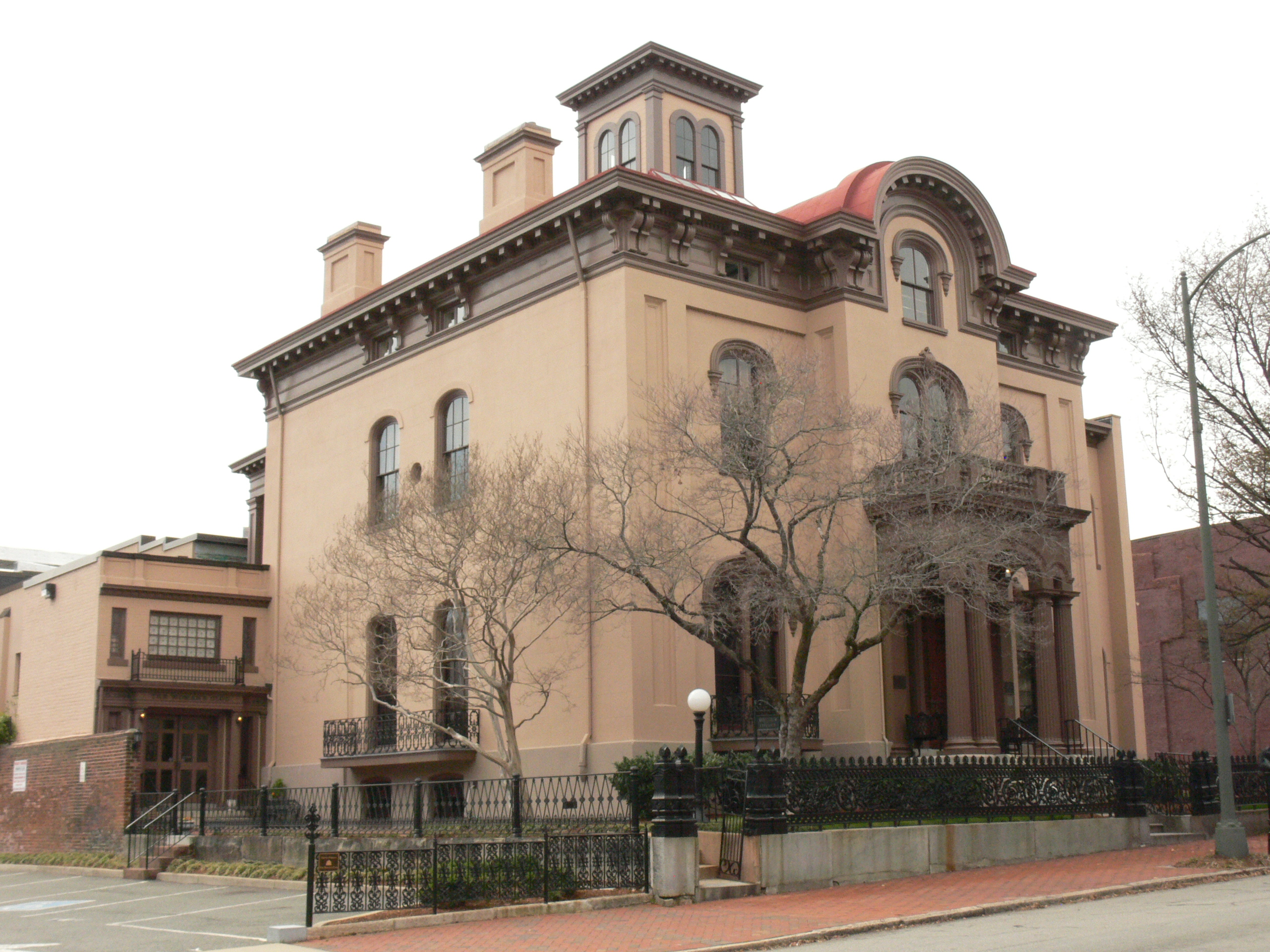
- Bolling Haxall House, March 2011

- Location within Virginia Location within the United States
- Location: 211 E. Franklin St., Richmond, Virginia
- Coordinates: 37°32′32″N 77°26′29″W
- Area: 9.9 acres (4.0 ha)
- Built: 1858
- Architectural style: Italian Villa
- NRHP reference No.: 72001522
- VLR No.: 127-0033

Significant dates
- Added to NRHP: March 16, 1972
- Designated VLR: November 16, 1971

Bolling Haxall House, also known as the Woman's Club, is a historic residential building located in Richmond, Virginia. It was built by Bolling Walker Haxall in 1858 and is a three-story Italian Villa style dwelling of sandstone-colored stucco, scored to imitate ashlar. It features a projecting central entrance on the front facade, a raised portico (with arched openings) supported by four fluted columns, and an elaborate double-bracketed, dentiled cornice. An auditorium was added in 1916, after the home's acquisition by the Woman's Club in 1900.

It was listed on the National Register of Historic Places in 1972.

== See also ==
- National Register of Historic Places listings in Richmond, Virginia
