= James River and Kanawha Canal =

Canal in Virginia

- James River and Kanawha Canal Historic District
- U.S. National Register of Historic Places
- U.S. Historic district
- Virginia Landmarks Register
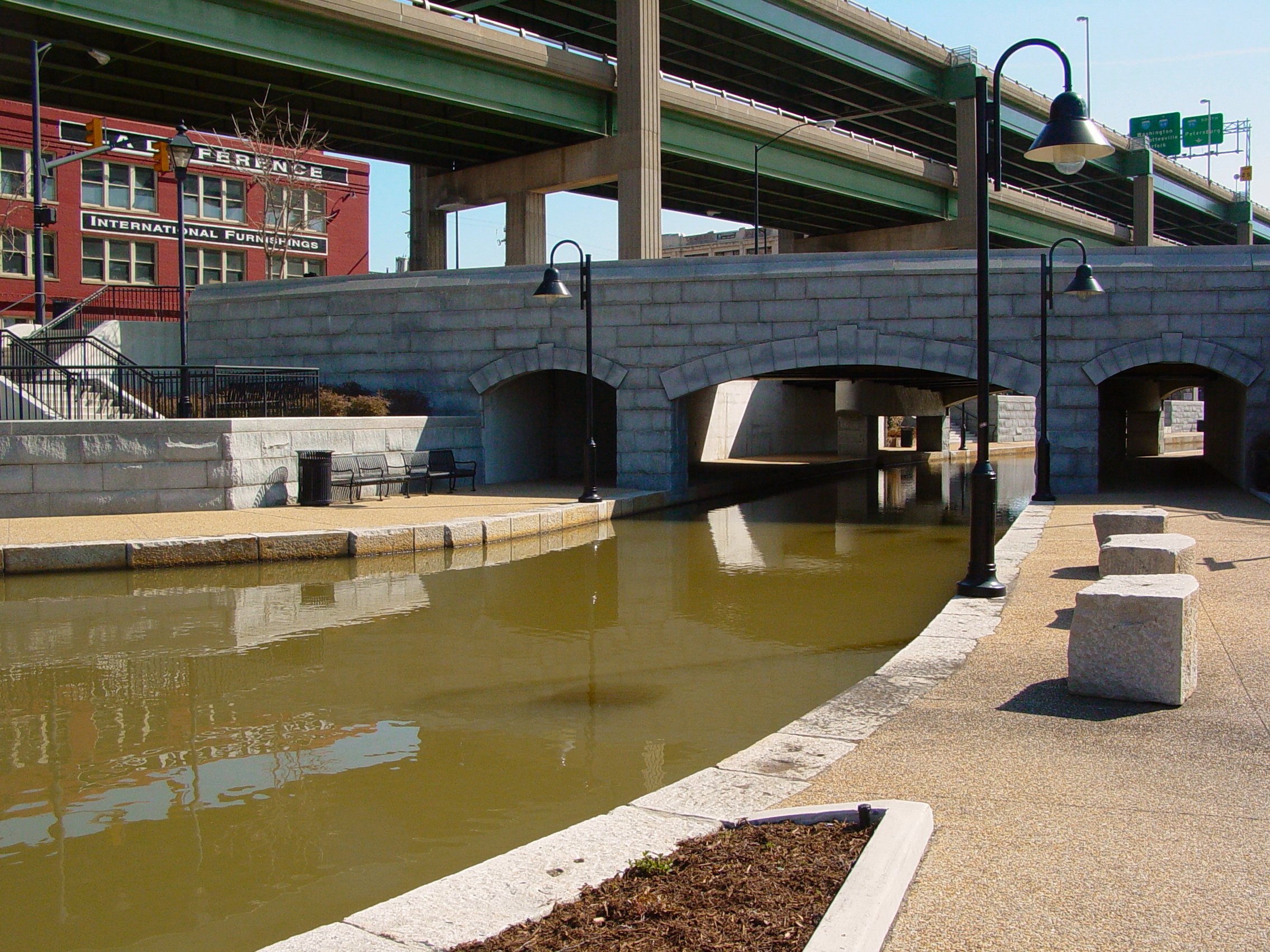
- Canal Walk, Richmond, Virginia

- Location within Virginia Location within the United States
- Nearest city: Richmond, Virginia
- Coordinates: 37°31′57.2514″N 77°25′54.876″W
- Area: 138 acres (56 ha)
- NRHP reference No.: 71000982
- VLR No.: 127-0171

Significant dates
- Added to NRHP: August 26, 1971
- Designated VLR: September 9, 1969

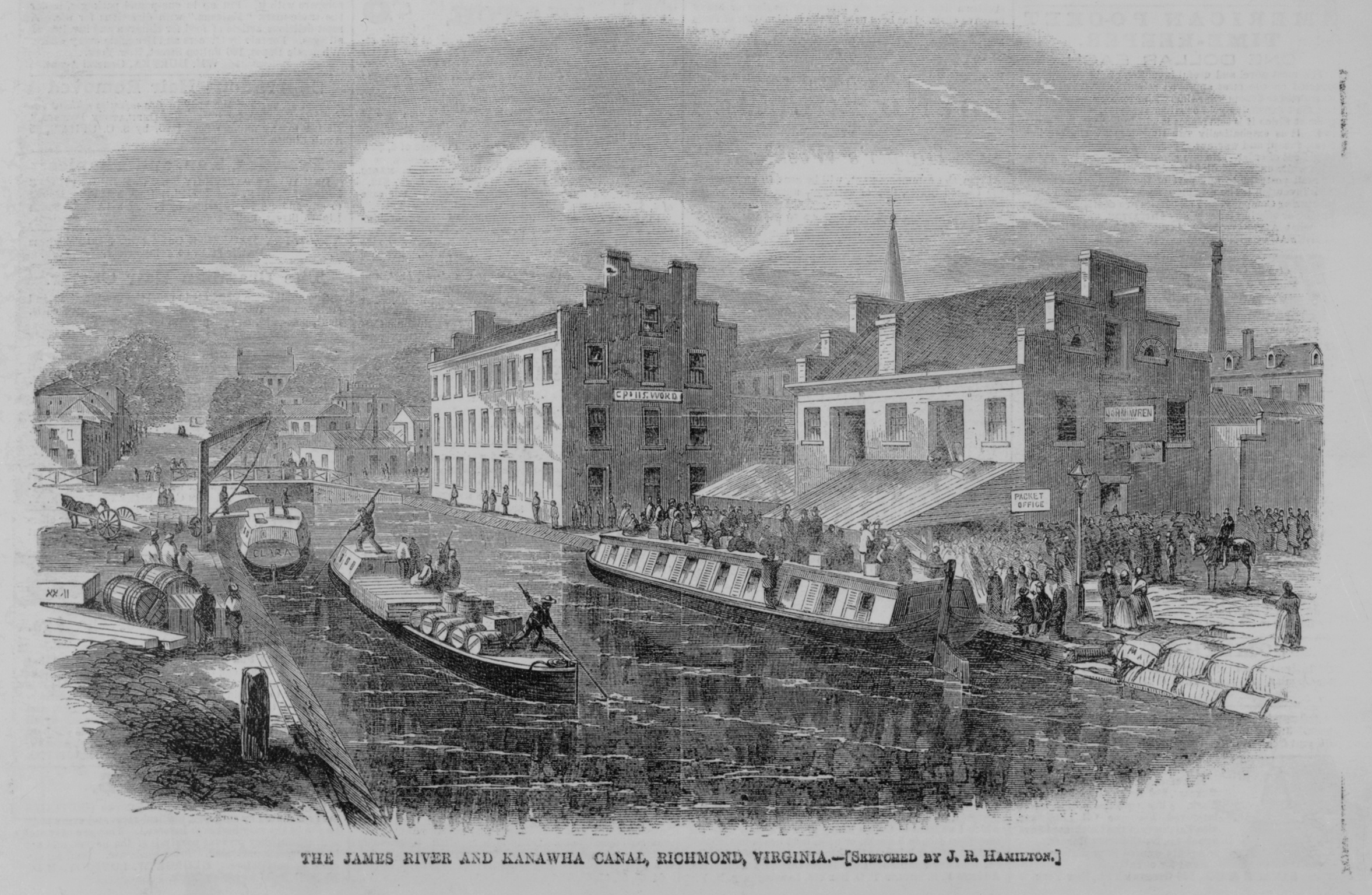
The canal in 1865.

The James River and Kanawha Canal was a partially built canal in Virginia intended to facilitate shipments of passengers and freight by water between the western counties of Virginia and the coast. Ultimately its towpath became the roadbed for a rail line following the same course.

Encouraged by George Washington, the canal project was begun in 1785 as the James River Company, and later restarted under the James River and Kanawha Canal Company. It was an expensive project which failed several times financially and was frequently damaged by floods. Though largely financed by the Commonwealth of Virginia through the Virginia Board of Public Works, it was only half completed by 1851, reaching Buchanan, in Botetourt County. When work to extend it further west stopped permanently, railroads were overtaking the canal as a far more productive mode of transportation.

After the American Civil War funds for resuming construction were unavailable from either the war-torn Commonwealth or private sources and the project did poorly against railroad competition, finally succumbing to damage done by massive flooding in 1877. In the end its right-of-way was bought and the canal was largely dismantled by the new Richmond and Alleghany Railroad, which laid tracks on the former towpath. The R&A became part of the Chesapeake and Ohio Railway in the 1890s, which developed much of the former canal route into an important line for West Virginia bituminous coal headed eastbound for the Peninsula Extension to reach the Hampton Roads coal piers at Newport News for worldwide export aboard large colliers.

== Planning a route ==
The James River and Kanawha Canal was a project first proposed by George Washington when he was a young man surveying the mountains of western Virginia, which at the time consisted of what is today West Virginia, Kentucky, and to the north bank of the Ohio river. He was searching for a way to open a water route to the West. He believed that was the key to helping Virginia become an economic powerhouse in what would emerge as the United States quite a few years later.

In those times, waterways were the major highways of commerce. Early developments along the east coast of the colonies tended to end at the Fall Line (the head of navigation) of the rivers that emptied into its great bays (e.g., the Delaware and the Chesapeake). Such early communities in Virginia included what we now know as Alexandria on the Potomac River, Fredericksburg on the Rappahannock River, Richmond and Lynchburg on the James River and Petersburg on the Appomattox River.

It was known by then that the Ohio River flowed into the Mississippi River, which flowed into the Gulf of Mexico. It was also known that the Allegheny Mountains formed the Eastern Continental Divide, and that there was apparently no inland waterway to sail between the two large watersheds.

By 1772, Washington had identified the Potomac and James rivers as the most promising locations for canals to be built to join with the western rivers. His preference was the James, as the Potomac led to rivers in land disputed with Pennsylvania and would be equally helpful to Maryland. The James could be aligned with the Kanawha River (in what is now West Virginia), and would best serve only Virginia, which was his priority. In 1785, the James River and Kanawha Company was created, with former Revolutionary War Commander in Chief George Washington as honorary president, to build locks around the falls at Richmond. By then, Washington was quite busy with the affairs of the new nation, in 1789 being elected its first president.

== Construction ==
Promoted by such men as George Washington, Edmund Randolph, and John Marshall, the James River and Kanawha Company opened the first commercial canal in the United States. Stretching from Richmond, Virginia to Westham, Virginia and paralleling the James for 7 miles (11 km), it supplemented existing bateaux transportation on the James River. These flat-bottomed boats floated down the James to Richmond laden with tobacco hogsheads and returned with French and English imports, furniture, dishes, and clothing.

In addition to bateaux, many canal boats were packets, which drew more water than the smaller bateaux. Mules and horses pulled the packets along the towpaths. Locks were necessary at points where the river had rapids. The American Revolutionary War and the War of 1812 each slowed construction. Work was slow, expensive, and very labor-intensive through the rocky terrain of Virginia's Piedmont region, a transitional area between the sandy coastal plain and the mountains. The early congregation of St. Peters Church in Richmond consisted mostly of Irish immigrants who worked on the canal. After many of the original Irish laborers died of hypothermia, they were replaced by enslaved Africans hired from plantation owners who lived near the route of the canal. After work stalled for a number of years the canal company went broke and gave up.

In 1820, the Commonwealth of Virginia took control of the project and with state funds provided through the Virginia Board of Public Works resumed construction. Work stalled yet again, then resumed in 1835 under the new James River and Kanawha Company, with Judge Benjamin Wright as Chief Engineer. He was assisted by his son Simon Wright, Charles Ellet Jr., and Daniel Livermore. By 1840, the canal was completed to Lynchburg. Service was inaugurated by William Henry Harrison who was elected president that same year. In 1847, Walter W. Gwynn was hired as Chief Engineer, with Edward Lorraine as his assistant.

The canal eventually extended 196.5 miles (316 km) west of Richmond to Buchanan by 1851. There, the plan was to link it to the James River and Kanawha Turnpike to provide passage through the most rugged portions of the mountains. The goal was to reach the Kanawha River at its head of navigation, about 30 miles (50 km) east of today's Charleston, West Virginia.

To this end, French capitalists represented by Ernest Bellot des Minieres and Henri-Théodore Olivari from Bordeaux proposed to complete the canal from Buchanan to the Ohio River as well as contribute to water line improvements. However, this did not materalize. The portage necessary made competition with railroads along the same route a real threat. Construction of a planned railroad there was delayed by the American Civil War. In addition, both war damage and interruption in the flow of commerce along the canal did great harm to it.

== Competition with railroads ==
Railroads began to emerge as a more efficient form of transportation in the 1830s, midway in the canal's construction. In spite of the appointment of former Confederate general Armistead Lindsay Long as Chief Engineer following his service in the Civil War (1861–1865), damage which the canal incurred during the conflict was never completely repaired.

By the time the Chesapeake and Ohio Railway was built through to the Ohio River in 1873, the canal's fate was clear. The James River and Kanawha Canal Company was authorized in 1876 to build the Buchanan and Clifton Forge Railway to connect the westernmost point of the canal with the C&O.

The Virginia General Assembly, in 1878, gave the James River and Kanawha Company the right to contract with the Buchanan and Clifton Forge Railroad for Convict Labor. However both the canal and the Buchanan and Clifton Forge Railway were sold to the Richmond and Allegheny Railroad company, which built tracks along the towpaths. That railroad was sold to the C&O, establishing Clifton Forge as the division point of the large east-to-west system that resulted when the pioneer railroads were combined under the Chesapeake and Ohio.

Today, CSX trains loaded with coal from the mountains follow the old canal route, much of it at a gentler "water level" grade, headed to port at Newport News at Hampton Roads. The Buckingham Branch Railroad, a short-line railroad, has a lease to operate the original C&O alignment over the former Virginia Central Railroad, including the Mountain Subdivision.

== Legacy ==
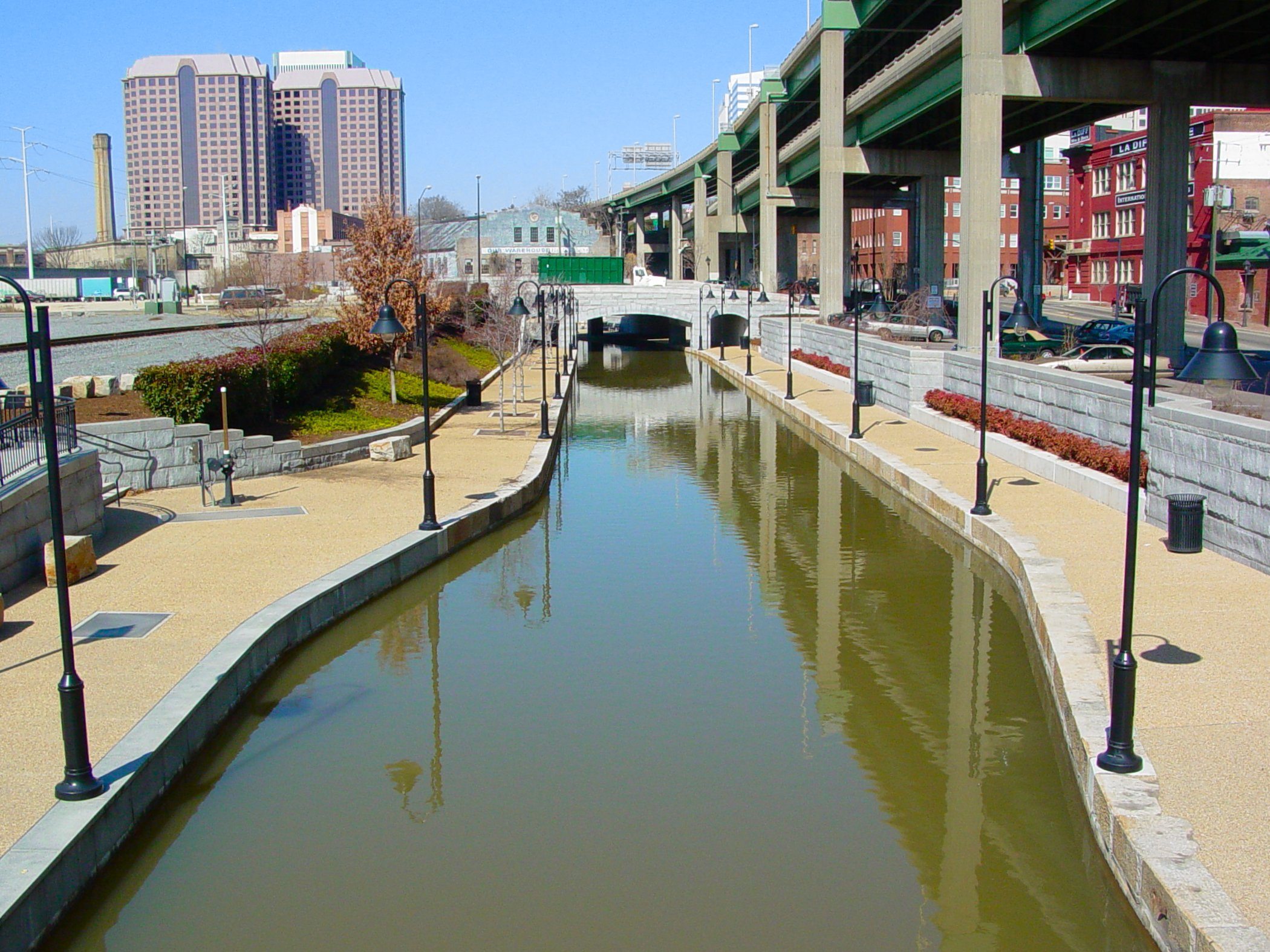
Canal Walk

=== Richmond Canal Walk ===
In the second half of the 20th century, portions of the old canal, locks and turning basins became the source of renewed interest in Richmond, Lynchburg and at other points along the line. As part of Richmond's revival and redevelopment of its waterfront, a portion of the canal was restored.

The 138-acre (56 ha) James River and Kanawha Canal Historic District was listed on the National Register of Historic Places in 1971. The historic district included one contributing building, nine contributing sites, and 21 contributing structures. Today boat rides are featured along a Canal Walk which extends for 1.25 miles (2 km) parallel to both the old Haxall Canal and James River and Kanawha canal. Several historical exhibits about the canals and the City of Richmond are dispersed along the way.

Visitors can also visit the Three-Mile Locks in Pump House Park, located behind the Carillon in William Byrd Park. This park is located 3 miles (5 km) upstream from the canal's turning basin. It contains the remnants of the Lower Arch (an entrance to the original James River Canal, and the Three-Mile Locks of the newer James River & Kanawha Canal. The park is also home to the City's Gothic-revival water pumping station originally known as the New Pump House, and its replacement, the 1924 hydroelectric pumping station. The James River Park System is working with a local nonprofit, the Friends of Pump House, to return the New Pump House to some form of public use. The park is popular with fisherman and dog lovers, and is near the Ship Yard.

The western entrance of the Richmond portion of the Canal lies near the village of Sabot in Goochland County while the eastern lies in the city near the Richmond Deepwater Terminal. Sufficient waterflow appears to be provided by Bosher Dam, an 1835 structure located on the western side of the city.

=== Lock-Keeper's House ===
The Lock-Keeper's House is a historic home located near Cedar Point, Goochland County, Virginia. It was built about 1836 to serve Lock Number 7 and is the last remaining lock-keeper's house of the James River and Kanawha Canal system.

=== Varney's Falls Dam ===
Varney's Falls Dam is a historic lock and dam structure on south side of the James River near Gilmore Mills, Botetourt County, Virginia.

=== Restored lock ===
There is a restored lock in the village of Big Island off the James River where it is crossed by the Blue Ridge Parkway. A visitor center is located in Amherst County just north of the bridge crossing the river. The canal lock is in Big Island on the Bedford County side of the James and is accessed by a path and a walkway underneath the bridge.

=== Midland Trail ===
Much of the former James River and Kanawha Turnpike portage route through West Virginia is today the Midland Trail, a National Scenic Byway.

=== Washington and Lee University ===
Stock from the canal worth $20,000 was given to Liberty Hall Academy in Virginia's Shenandoah Valley by George Washington as an endowment. That gift prompted the renaming of the Academy to Washington College, which became today's Washington and Lee University in Lexington, Virginia.
