= Roanoke metropolitan area =

Metropolitan area in Virginia, United States

- Metropolitan Statistical Area
- Roanoke, VA Metropolitan Statistical Area
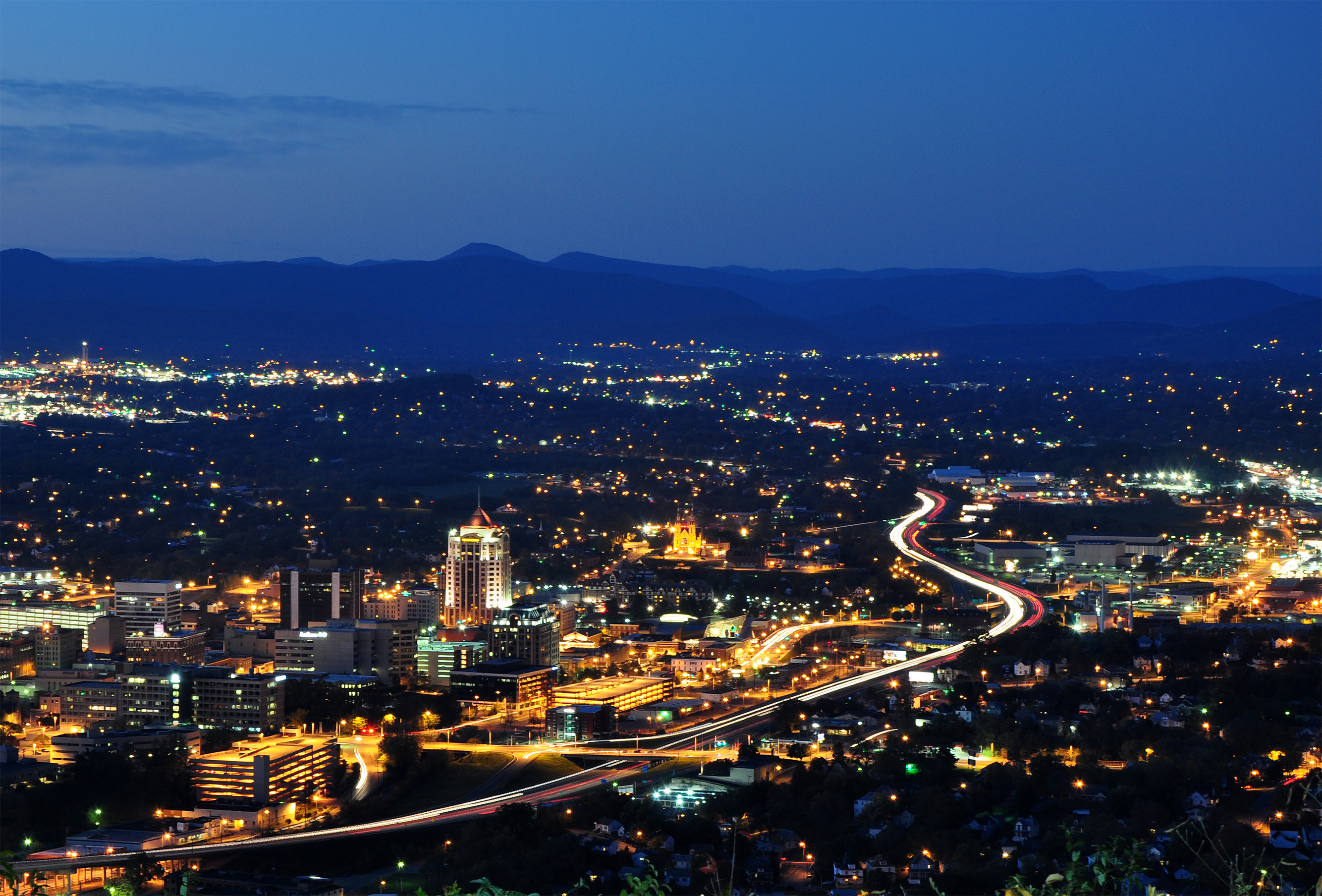
- Roanoke City from Mill Mountain Star
Interactive Map of Roanoke Metropolitan Area
Roanoke, VA MSA
City of Roanoke
City of Salem
- Country: United States
- State: Virginia
- Largest city: Roanoke
- Other city: Salem

Area
  - Total: 1,711 sq mi (4,430 km^{2})

Population (2020)
  - Total: 315,251
  - Density: 184.2/sq mi (71.14/km^{2})

GDP
  - Total: $19.936 billion (2022)
- Time zone: UTC-5 (EST)
  - Summer (DST): UTC-4 (EDT)

The Roanoke Metropolitan Statistical Area is a Metropolitan Statistical Area (MSA) in Virginia as defined by the United States Office of Management and Budget (OMB). The Roanoke MSA is sometimes referred to as the Roanoke Valley, even though the Roanoke MSA occupies a larger area than the Roanoke Valley. It is geographically similar to the area known as the Roanoke Region of Virginia, but while the latter includes Alleghany County, the former does not. As of the 2020 census, the MSA had a population of 315,251.

Figures through 2000 do not include Franklin County (50,345 est. 2005 population) and Craig County (5,154 est. 2005 population). The Census Bureau has since added them to the Roanoke MSA, which is the fourth largest in Virginia (behind Northern Virginia, Hampton Roads, and the Greater Richmond area), and the largest in the western half of the state. Its current rank is 201 among all 363 MSAs. The Roanoke, VA MSA population changed from 288,307 in 2000 to 315,251 in 2020, a greater than 9.34 percent change.

== MSA components ==
Note: Since a state constitutional change in 1871, all cities in Virginia are independent cities that are not located in any county. The OMB considers these independent cities to be county-equivalents for the purpose of defining MSAs in Virginia.

Four counties and two independent cities are included in the Roanoke Metropolitan Statistical Area.

- Counties
  - Botetourt
  - Craig
  - Franklin
  - Roanoke
- Independent Cities
  - Roanoke
  - Salem

== Politics ==
Presidential Election Results
Year	GOP	DEM	Others
2020	57.3% 96,088	40.8% 68,390	1.9% 3,071
2016	57.7% 87,506	36.9% 55,990	5.3% 8,089
2012	57.3% 85,662	41.4% 61,885	1.3% 2,014
2008	54.6% 81,633	44.2% 66,098	1.2% 1,805
2004	60.0% 80,991	39.2% 52,901	0.9% 1,205
2000	55.8% 68,230	41.8% 51,032	2.4% 2,929
1996	53.1% 52,684	36.2% 35,922	10.7% 10,636
1992	45.1% 52,889	31.3% 43,360	13.6% 15,888
1988	56.0% 57,284	43.2% 44,244	0.8% 826
1984	60.9% 63,591	38.5% 40,207	0.6% 642
1980	49.1% 47,377	46.1% 44,405	4.7% 4,570
1976	43.9% 39,942	54.7% 49,783	1.4% 1,301
1972	70.4% 53,364	27.4% 20,777	2.2% 1,672
1968	52.2% 37,977	25.1% 18,268	22.6% 16,439
1964	48.3% 28,732	51.6% 30,713	0.1% 44
1960	60.7% 29,010	39.0% 18,638	0.3% 122

== Communities ==
=== Places with more than 100,000 inhabitants ===
- Roanoke (Principal city)

=== Places with 10,000 to 30,000 inhabitants ===
- Cave Spring (census-designated place)
- Hollins (census-designated place)
- Salem

=== Places with 1,000 to 10,000 inhabitants ===
- Blue Ridge (census-designated place)
- Buchanan
- Cloverdale (census-designated place)
- Daleville (census-designated place)
- Ferrum (census-designated place)
- Henry Fork (census-designated place)
- Laymantown (census-designated place)
- North Shore (census-designated place)
- Rocky Mount
- Union Hall (census-designated place)
- Vinton
- Westlake Corner (census-designated place)

=== Places with less than 1,000 inhabitants ===
- Boones Mill
- Fincastle
- Glenvar (census-designated place)
- New Castle
- Penhook (census-designated place)
- Troutville

=== Unincorporated places ===
- Abbott
- Airpoint
- Alpine
- Amsterdam
- Arcadia
- Baldwin
- Bennett Springs
- Bent Mountain
- Bessemer
- Bonsack
- Botetourt East
- Bradshaw
- British Woods
- Callaway
- Captain
- Catawba
- Clearbrook
- Coyner Springs
- Daggers Springs
- Dillon
- Dundee
- Eagle Rock
- Flatwoods
- Fork Mountain
- Gala
- Glade Hill
- Glebe Mills
- Glen Wilton
- Greyledge
- Haden
- Hale's Ford
- Hanging Rock
- Harvey
- Haymakertown
- Heatherstone
- Hipes
- Howell Mills
- Kyles Mills
- Leslie
- Lignite
- Lithia
- Lone Star
- Maggie
- Marshalltown
- Masons Cove
- Medley
- Mount Union
- Munford
- Nace
- Niagara
- Oldfields
- Oriskany
- Owens
- Paint Bank
- Parr
- Peachtree
- Pico
- Poages Mill
- Rainbow Forest
- Riverside
- Rocky Point
- Salisbury
- Simmonsville
- Snow Creek
- Solitude
- Spec
- Springwood
- Starkey
- Stepping Stone
- Strom
- Surber
- Trinity
- Wabun
- Webster
- Wright

== Demographics ==
As of the census of 2000, there were 288,309 people, 119,366 households, and 80,009 families residing within the MSA. The racial makeup of the MSA was 84.96% White, 12.21% African American, 0.17% Native American, 1.05% Asian, 0.02% Pacific Islander, 0.47% from other races, and 1.12% from two or more races. Hispanic or Latino of any race were 1.13% of the population.

The median income for a household in the MSA was $40,251, and the median income for a family was $47,248. Males had a median income of $32,294 versus $23,427 for females. The per capita income for the MSA was $20,390.

County or equivalent	Seat	2025 Estimate	2020 Census	Change	Area	Density
Roanoke city	—	99,111	100,011	−0.90%	43 sq mi (110 km^{2})	2,305/sq mi (890/km^{2})
Roanoke	Salem	97,150	96,929	+0.23%	251 sq mi (650 km^{2})	387/sq mi (149/km^{2})
Franklin	Rocky Mount	55,526	54,477	+1.93%	712 sq mi (1,840 km^{2})	78/sq mi (30/km^{2})
Botetourt	Fincastle	34,144	33,596	+1.63%	546 sq mi (1,410 km^{2})	63/sq mi (24/km^{2})
Salem city	—	25,816	25,346	+1.85%	15 sq mi (39 km^{2})	1,721/sq mi (665/km^{2})
Craig	New Castle	4,800	4,892	−1.88%	331 sq mi (860 km^{2})	15/sq mi (6/km^{2})
Total		316,547	315,251	+0.41%	1,898 sq mi (4,920 km^{2})	167/sq mi (64/km^{2})

== See also ==
- List of U.S. Metropolitan Statistical Areas in Virginia
- Virginia census statistical areas
