= Virginia State Route 43 =

State highway in Virginia, United States

State Route 43

Route information
- Maintained by VDOT
- Length: 61.20 mi (98.49 km)
- Existed: July 1, 1933–present
- Tourist routes: Virginia Byway

Altavista – Blue Ridge Parkway
- Length: 39.79 mi (64.04 km)
- South end: US 29 Bus. in Altavista
- Major intersections: US 29 in Altavista US 221 Bus. / US 460 Bus. / SR 122 Bus. in Bedford
- North end: Blue Ridge Parkway at Peaks of Otter

Blue Ridge Parkway – Eagle Rock
- Length: 21.41 mi (34.46 km)
- South end: SR 695 / Blue Ridge Parkway near Buchanan
- Major intersections: US 11 in Buchanan
- North end: US 220 in Eagle Rock

Location
- Country: United States
- State: Virginia
- Counties: Campbell, Bedford, Botetourt

Highway system
- Virginia Routes; Interstate; US; Primary; Secondary; Byways; History; HOT lanes
← SR 42	→ SR 45

State Route 43 (SR 43) is a primary state highway in the U.S. state of Virginia. The state highway consists of two disjoint segments that have a total length of 61.20 miles (98.49 km). The southern portion of the state highway runs 39.79 miles (64.04 km) from U.S. Route 29 Business (US 29 Bus.) in Altavista north to the Blue Ridge Parkway at Peaks of Otter. The northern segment has a length of 21.41 miles (34.46 km) between the Blue Ridge Parkway near Buchanan and US 220 in Eagle Rock. The two sections of SR 43 are connected by 4.9 miles (7.9 km) of the Blue Ridge Parkway. The southern portion of the state highway connects Altavista with Bedford and Peaks of Otter. The northern section of SR 43 follows the James River through a narrow valley (Narrow Passage Road) between Buchanan and Eagle Rock.

SR 43 is a Virginia Byway except south of the US 29 bypass of Altavista.

== Route description ==
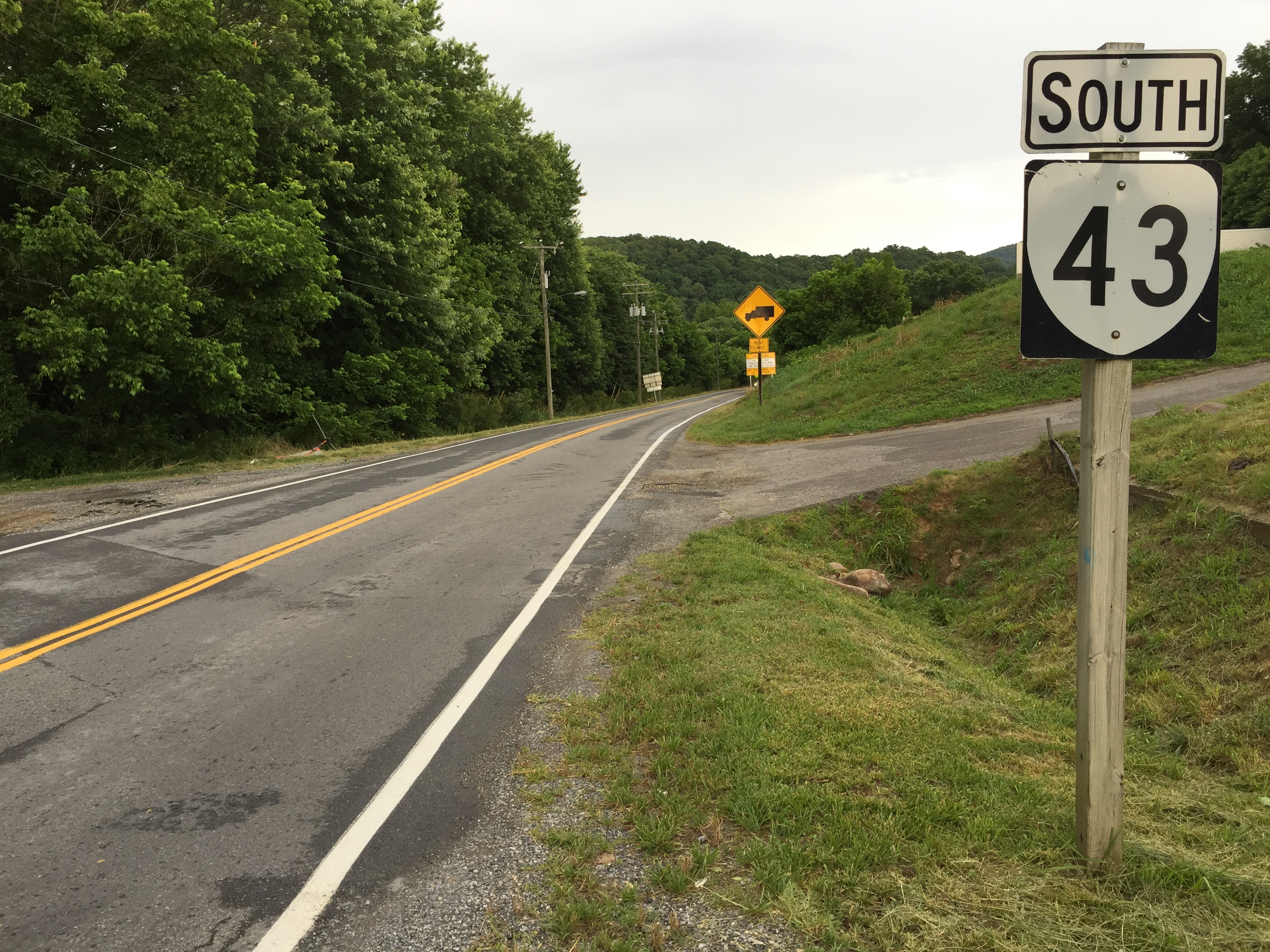
View south along SR 43 at SR 1315 in Buchanan

SR 43 has two disjoint sections. SR 43 begins at an intersection with US 29 Business (Main Street) in the town of Altavista. The terminus is just north of the Roanoke River, which forms the boundary between Campbell and Pittsylvania counties. The junction is also adjacent to the crossing of Norfolk Southern Railway's Altavista and Danville district rail lines. SR 43 heads northwest as Bedford Avenue to the town limit at the highway's diamond interchange with US 29 (Wards Road). The state highway continues north as Bedford Highway toward Lynch Station, where the highway curves to the southwest to parallel the north bank of the Roanoke River. At Leesville, a short distance north of the impoundment of the river to form Leesville Lake, SR 43 begins to follow Goose Creek and enters Bedford County. The state highway, now named Leesville Road, veers northwest and intersects SR 626 (Smith Mountain Lake Parkway) and SR 628 (Mentow Drive) in the hamlet of Mentow. SR 628 is also known as Bishop Creek Road, which provides a shorter, parallel route to SR 43 between Lynch Station and Mentow.

In the hamlet of Gillespie, SR 43 intersects SR 24 (Wyatts Way); the two highways head west concurrently as Glenwood Drive. West of Gillespie, SR 24 continues west as Shingle Block Road and SR 43 heads north along Virginia Byway toward Bedford, where the highway becomes South Street. Just after entering the town, the state highway crosses over US 460 and US 221 with no access. Just south of downtown, SR 43 splits into a pair of two-way street: northbound follows Talbott Street and Otey Street to Main Street while southbound follows South Street, which is one-way southbound for one block immediately south of Main Street. SR 43 turns west onto Main Street and has a very short concurrency with US 460 Bus. Two blocks to the west, SR 43 turns north onto Bridge Street, where the highway runs together with US 221 Bus. (signed as US 221) and SR 122 Bus. across Norfolk Southern's Blue Ridge District. North of the railroad bridge, SR 43 turns west onto Peak Street; US 221 Bus. and SR 122 Bus. heads northeast on Longwood Avenue.

SR 43 exits the town of Bedford on Peaks Road, which crosses the Otter River on its way to Blue Ridge Mountain. The state highway enters Jefferson National Forest and ascends the mountain among the Peaks of Otter. The southern section of SR 43 reaches its northern terminus at the Blue Ridge Parkway adjacent to the Peaks of Otter Visitor Center. The Blue Ridge Parkway heads northwest to Bearwallow Gap, where the northern section of SR 43 begins at an interchange. The state highway, which is named Parkway Drive, enters Botetourt County and descends Cove Mountain to the town of Buchanan. SR 43 turns onto Main Street and has a short concurrency with US 11 to cross the James River. On the north side of the river, the state highway turns west onto First Street and leaves the town as Narrow Passage Road, which re-enters the national forest. SR 43 passes under Interstate 81 with no access and parallels the river past James River High School and the community of Springwood. Narrow Passage Road then continues on to the town of Eagle Rock, where the highway is known as Second Street and passes through a water gap between Rathole Mountain and Crawford Mountain. The state highway follows the river north a short distance to its northern terminus at US 220 (Botetourt Road).

== Major intersections ==
County	Location	mi	km	Destinations	Notes
Campbell	Altavista	0.00	0.00	US 29 Bus. (Main Street) – Danville, Lynchburg	Southern terminus of southern section
Campbell		1.58	2.54	US 29 (Wards Road) – Lynchburg, Danville	Interchange
Bedford	Gillespie	16.94	27.26	SR 24 east (Wyatts Way) – Evington	Southern end of SR 24 concurrency
Bedford		19.52	31.41	SR 24 west (Shingle Block Road) – Roanoke	Northern end of SR 24 concurrency
Bedford	Bedford	28.99	46.65	US 460 Bus. east (East Main Street)	Southern end of US 460 Bus. concurrency
Bedford	Bedford	29.14	46.90	US 221 Bus. south / US 460 Bus. west / SR 122 Bus. south (West Main Street)	Northern end of US 460 Bus. concurrency; southern end of US 221 Bus. / SR 122 Bus. concurrency
Bedford	Bedford	29.41	47.33	US 221 Bus. north / SR 122 Bus. north (Longwood Avenue)	Northern end of US 221 Bus. / SR 122 Bus. concurrency
Bedford	Peaks of Otter	39.79	64.04	Blue Ridge Parkway north	Northern terminus of southern section
4.91-mile-long (7.90 km) gap along the Blue Ridge Parkway
Botetourt	Bearwallow Gap	39.79	64.04	Blue Ridge Parkway south / SR 695 south (Goose Creek Valley Road) – Montvale	Interchange; southern terminus of northern section
Botetourt	Buchanan	44.54	71.68	US 11 south (Main Street) / SR 1305 (Lowe Street) to I-81 south – Roanoke	Southern end of US 11 concurrency
Botetourt	Buchanan	44.72	71.97	US 11 north (Main Street) / SR 1318 (Old Mill Road) to I-81 north – Natural Bridge	Northern end of US 11 concurrency
Botetourt	Eagle Rock	61.31	98.67	US 220 (Botetourt Road)	Northern terminus of northern section
1.000 mi = 1.609 km; 1.000 km = 0.621 mi: Concurrency terminus

< SR 214	District 2 State Routes; 1928–1933	SR 216 >
< SR 319	District 3 State Routes; 1928–1933	SR 321 >
