= Rainbow Forest, Virginia =

Unincorporated community in Virginia, United States

Rainbow Forest
- Unincorporated community
- Location within the Commonwealth of Virginia Rainbow Forest (the United States)
- Coordinates: 37°21′25″N 79°51′19″W
- Country: United States
- State: Virginia
- County: Botetourt
- Time zone: UTC−5 (Eastern (EST))
  - Summer (DST): UTC−4 (EDT)
- ZIP Codes: 24715 (Troutville)

Rainbow Forest is an unincorporated community in southern Botetourt County, Virginia, United States. It is part of the Roanoke metropolitan area.

== Education ==
The community is served by Botetourt County Public Schools. Public school students residing in Rainbow Forest are zoned to attend Colonial Elementary School, Read Mountain Middle School, and Lord Botetourt High School.

Higher education institutions are located in Roanoke.

== Infrastructure ==
Aqua Virginia maintains a community water system within Rainbow Forest.

=== Public safety ===
Law enforcement is provided by the Botetourt County Sheriff's Office. Fire protection and emergency medical services are provided by the Botetourt County Department of Fire and EMS and the Blue Ridge Volunteer Fire Department and Rescue Squad.

== Transportation ==
=== Air ===
The Roanoke-Blacksburg Regional Airport is the closest airport with commercial service to the community.

=== Road ===
- SR 658 (Laymantown Road)

=== Rail ===
The closest passenger rail service is located in Roanoke.
