= Stepping stone =

Stepping stone(s) may refer to:

- Stepping stones, stones placed to allow pedestrians to cross a watercourse

== Places ==
- Stepping Stone, Virginia, US, an unincorporated community
- Stepping Stones (islands), Antarctic and sub-Antarctic

== Buildings ==
- Stepping Stones (house), of Bill and Lois Wilson of Alcoholics Anonymous, in Bedford Hills, New York, US
- Stepping Stones Light, a lighthouse on Long Island Sound, New York, US
- Stepping Stones Museum for Children, Norwalk, Connecticut, US
- "Stepping Stones", home of Jacques Futrelle in Scituate, Massachusetts, US

== Film and theatre ==
- The Stepping Stone, a 1916 American silent film
- Stepping Stones (film), a 1931 British musical
- Stepping Stones (musical), a 1923 Broadway musical

== Music ==
=== Albums ===
- Stepping Stone (album) or the title song (see below), by Lari White, 1998
- Stepping Stones (album), by Wendy Matthews, 1999
- Stepping Stones: Live at the Village Vanguard, by Woody Shaw, 1979

=== Songs ===
- "Stepping Stone" (Duffy song), 2008
- "Stepping Stone" (Eminem song), 2018
- "Stepping Stone" (Jimi Hendrix song), 1970
- "Stepping Stone" (Lari White song), 1998
- "(I'm Not Your) Steppin' Stone", a song written by Tommy Boyce and Bobby Hart, 1966; recorded by many performers
- "Stepping Stone", by Argent from Argent, 1970
- "Stepping Stone", by AM
- "Steppin' Stone", by Black Label Society from Hangover Music Vol. VI, 2004
- "Stepping Stone", by Clannad from Sirius, 1987
- "Stepping Stone", by Natasha Bedingfield from N.B., 2007
- "Stepping Stones", by Bert Jansch and John Renbourn from Bert and John, 1966
- "Stepping Stones", by the Headboys, 1979
- "Stepping Stones", by Johnny Harris, 1970

== Schools ==
- Stepping Stone Educational Centre, Port Harcourt, Rivers State, Nigeria
- Stepping Stone Model School, Alipurduar, West Bengal, India

== Other uses ==
- Stepping Stone Purse, an American horse race
- Stepping-stone squeeze, a contract bridge technique
- Stepping Stones: Interviews with Seamus Heaney, a 2008 book by Dennis O'Driscoll
- Stepping Stones, a 1977 UK political report by John Hoskyns and Norman S. Strauss

== See also ==
- Island hopping (disambiguation)
- Stepstone (disambiguation)
