= Cloverdale, Virginia =

- Census-designated place
- Location within the Commonwealth of Virginia
- Coordinates: 37°21′40″N 79°54′16″W
- Country: United States
- State: Virginia
- County: Botetourt

Area
  - Total: 3.1 sq mi (8.1 km^{2})
  - Land: 3.1 sq mi (8.1 km^{2})
  - Water: 0 sq mi (0.0 km^{2})
- Elevation: 1,142 ft (348 m)

Population (2020)
  - Total: 3,410
  - Density: 1,100/sq mi (420/km^{2})
- Time zone: UTC−5 (Eastern (EST))
  - Summer (DST): UTC−4 (EDT)
- ZIP Codes: 24019 (Roanoke); 24077 (Cloverdale)
- Area codes: 540 and 826
- FIPS code: 51-17680
- GNIS feature ID: 1499276

Cloverdale is a census-designated place (CDP) in southern Botetourt County, Virginia, United States. The population was 3,410 at the 2020 census. The community is located along State Route 654. It is part of the Roanoke metropolitan area.

== History ==
Cloverdale began as an Iron Furnace Plantation consisting of an iron furnace and forests for lumber to produce charcoal. Robert Stoner, Botetrout County Historian states that Robert Harvey began to develop this area as a furnace as early as 1787.

== Geography ==
Cloverdale is located at 37°21′40″N 79°54′16″W (37.361008, −79.904575) in Botetourt County.

According to the United States Census Bureau, the CDP has a total area of 3.1 square miles (8.1 km^{2}), all land.

== Demographics ==
Historical population
Census	Pop.	Note	%±
2000	2,986		—
2010	3,119		4.5%
2020	3,410		9.3%
Source: U.S. Census Bureau

=== 2020 census ===
As of the 2020 census, Cloverdale had a population of 3,410. The median age was 45.8 years. 21.4% of residents were under the age of 18 and 22.8% of residents were 65 years of age or older. For every 100 females there were 94.0 males, and for every 100 females age 18 and over there were 90.4 males age 18 and over.

96.7% of residents lived in urban areas, while 3.3% lived in rural areas.

There were 1,387 households in Cloverdale, of which 29.1% had children under the age of 18 living in them. Of all households, 59.0% were married-couple households, 11.5% were households with a male householder and no spouse or partner present, and 24.0% were households with a female householder and no spouse or partner present. About 24.3% of all households were made up of individuals and 12.6% had someone living alone who was 65 years of age or older.

There were 1,439 housing units, of which 3.6% were vacant. The homeowner vacancy rate was 1.5% and the rental vacancy rate was 4.4%.

Racial composition as of the 2020 census
Race	Number	Percent
White	2,885	84.6%
Black or African American	94	2.8%
American Indian and Alaska Native	21	0.6%
Asian	59	1.7%
Native Hawaiian and Other Pacific Islander	0	0.0%
Some other race	171	5.0%
Two or more races	180	5.3%
Hispanic or Latino (of any race)	270	7.9%

=== 2010 census ===
As of the census of 2010, there were 3,119 people residing in the CDP. There were 1,336 housing units. The racial makeup of the CDP was 93.9% White, 3.6% African American, 0.3% American Indian, 0.9% Asian, 0.0% Pacific Islander, 0.4% from other races, and 0.8% from two or more races. Hispanic or Latino of any race were 2.3% of the population.

=== 2000 census ===
As of the census of 2000, there were 2,986 people, 1,158 households, and 858 families residing in the CDP. The population density was 956.2 people per square mile (369.5/km^{2}). There were 1,204 housing units at an average density of 385.6/sq mi (149.0/km^{2}). The racial makeup of the CDP was 95.01% White, 2.21% African American, 0.10% Native American, 1.17% Asian, 0.80% from other races, and 0.70% from two or more races. Hispanic or Latino of any race were 0.77% of the population.

There were 1,158 households, out of which 37.0% had children under the age of 18 living with them, 63.4% were married couples living together, 8.0% had a female householder with no husband present, and 25.9% were non-families. 22.4% of all households were made up of individuals, and 6.9% had someone living alone who was 65 years of age or older. The average household size was 2.58 and the average family size was 3.05.

In the CDP, the population was spread out, with 26.9% under the age of 18, 7.0% from 18 to 24, 28.4% from 25 to 44, 27.3% from 45 to 64, and 10.5% who were 65 years of age or older. The median age was 39 years. For every 100 females there were 95.7 males. For every 100 females age 18 and over, there were 92.0 males.

The median income for a household in the CDP was $51,847, and the median income for a family was $55,893. Males had a median income of $40,369 versus $27,566 for females. The per capita income for the CDP was $25,075. About 6.3% of families and 8.2% of the population were below the poverty line, including 8.7% of those under age 18 and 6.2% of those age 65 or over.

== Government ==
The United States Postal Service operates the Cloverdale Post Office within the CDP, although some portions of the community have a Roanoke ZIP Code.

== Education ==
The CDP is served by Botetourt County Public Schools. Public school students residing in Cloverdale are zoned to attend either Cloverdale Elementary School or Greenfield Elementary School, Read Mountain Middle School, and Lord Botetourt High School.

Higher education institutions are located in Hollins and Roanoke.

== Infrastructure ==
=== Public safety ===
Law enforcement is provided by the Botetourt County Sheriff's Office.

Fire protection is provided by the Botetourt County Department of Fire and EMS and Troutville Volunteer Fire Department. Emergency medical services are provided by the Botetourt County Department of Fire and EMS from the Read Mountain and Troutville fire stations. Previously, the Read Mountain Fire and Rescue Department provided fire protection and emergency medical services to portions of the community. The volunteer agency dissolved in 2024 due to lack of membership.

=== Transportation ===
==== Air ====
The Roanoke-Blacksburg Regional Airport is the closest airport with commercial service to the CDP.

==== Roads ====
- Interstate 81
- U.S. Route 11 (Lee Highway)
- U.S. Route 220A (Cloverdale Road)
- Virginia State Route 654 (Read Mountain Road)

==== Rail ====
The Norfolk Southern operated Cloverdale Branch and Roanoke Subdivision run through the CDP. The closest passenger rail service is located in Roanoke.

== Notable person ==
Cloverdale is the birthplace of Charles Follis, who became the first African-American to play professional football when he signed with the Shelby Blues in 1904.
