= Laymantown, Virginia =

- Census-designated place
- Location within the Commonwealth of Virginia
- Coordinates: 37°21′37″N 79°50′56″W
- Country: United States
- State: Virginia
- County: Botetourt

Area
  - Total: 3.3 sq mi (8.5 km^{2})
  - Land: 3.3 sq mi (8.5 km^{2})
  - Water: 0 sq mi (0.0 km^{2})
- Elevation: 1,348 ft (411 m)

Population (2020)
  - Total: 1,867
  - Density: 570/sq mi (220/km^{2})
- Time zone: UTC−5 (Eastern (EST))
  - Summer (DST): UTC−4 (EDT)
- ZIP Code: 24175 (Troutville)
- Area code: 540
- FIPS code: 51-44620
- GNIS feature ID: 1867593

Laymantown is a census-designated place (CDP) in southern Botetourt County, Virginia, United States. The population was 1,867 at the 2020 census. The community is located along State Route 658 (Laymantown Road). It is part of the Roanoke metropolitan area.

== Geography ==
Laymantown is located at 37°21′37″N 79°50′56″W.

According to the United States Census Bureau, the CDP has a total area of 3.3 square miles (8.5 km^{2}), all land.

== Demographics ==
Historical population
Census	Pop.	Note	%±
2000	2,034		—
2010	1,979		−2.7%
2020	1,867		−5.7%
Source: U.S. Census Bureau

=== 2020 census ===
As of the 2020 census, Laymantown had a population of 1,867. The median age was 47.1 years. 19.3% of residents were under the age of 18 and 26.4% of residents were 65 years of age or older. For every 100 females there were 100.3 males, and for every 100 females age 18 and over there were 105.2 males age 18 and over.

100.0% of residents lived in urban areas, while 0.0% lived in rural areas.

There were 738 households in Laymantown, of which 27.1% had children under the age of 18 living in them. Of all households, 69.5% were married-couple households, 12.5% were households with a male householder and no spouse or partner present, and 15.3% were households with a female householder and no spouse or partner present. About 18.5% of all households were made up of individuals and 11.9% had someone living alone who was 65 years of age or older.

There were 766 housing units, of which 3.7% were vacant. The homeowner vacancy rate was 1.8% and the rental vacancy rate was 13.6%.

Racial composition as of the 2020 census
Race	Number	Percent
White	1,727	92.5%
Black or African American	38	2.0%
American Indian and Alaska Native	1	0.1%
Asian	21	1.1%
Native Hawaiian and Other Pacific Islander	0	0.0%
Some other race	7	0.4%
Two or more races	73	3.9%
Hispanic or Latino (of any race)	24	1.3%

=== 2010 census ===
As of the census of 2010, there were 1,979 people residing in the CDP. There were 787 housing units. The racial makeup of the CDP was 96.4% White, 1.5% African American, 0.2% Native American, 0.7% Asian, 0.0% Pacific Islander, 0.1% from other races, and 1.2% from two or more races. Hispanic or Latino of any race were 0.9% of the population.

=== 2000 census ===
As of the census of 2000, there were 2,034 people, 762 households, and 653 families residing in the CDP. The population density was 618.1 people per square mile (238.7/km^{2}). There were 794 housing units at an average density of 241.3/sq mi (93.2/km^{2}). The racial makeup of the CDP was 96.95% White, 1.67% African American, 0.25% Native American, 0.59% Asian, 0.20% from other races, and 0.34% from two or more races. Hispanic or Latino of any race were 0.34% of the population.

There were 762 households, out of which 32.9% had children under the age of 18 living with them, 77.0% were married couples living together, 6.6% had a female householder with no husband present, and 14.3% were non-families. 13.5% of all households were made up of individuals, and 5.9% had someone living alone who was 65 years of age or older. The average household size was 2.67 and the average family size was 2.91.

In the CDP, the population was spread out, with 23.6% under the age of 18, 4.4% from 18 to 24, 24.9% from 25 to 44, 32.7% from 45 to 64, and 14.4% who were 65 years of age or older. The median age was 44 years. For every 100 females there were 94.5 males. For every 100 females age 18 and over, there were 94.4 males.

The median income for a household in the CDP was $58,571, and the median income for a family was $64,327. Males had a median income of $43,693 versus $31,789 for females. The per capita income for the CDP was $24,231. About 2.9% of families and 2.8% of the population were below the poverty line, including 4.5% of those under age 18 and none of those age 65 or over.

== Government ==
The United States Postal Service does not operate a post office within the CDP. Addresses use a Troutville ZIP Code.

Law enforcement is provided by the Botetourt County Sheriff's Office. Fire protection is provided by the Blue Ridge Volunteer Fire Department and Rescue Squad. Emergency medical services are provided by the Botetourt County Department of Fire and EMS.

== Education ==
The CDP is served by Botetourt County Public Schools. Public school students residing in Laymantown are zoned to attend Colonial Elementary School, Read Mountain Middle School, and Lord Botetourt High School.

The closest higher education institutions are located in Roanoke.

== Infrastructure ==
Aqua Virginia maintains a community water system within the CDP.

== Transportation ==
=== Air ===
The Roanoke-Blacksburg Regional Airport is the closest airport with commercial service to the CDP.

=== Highways ===
- US Route 221
- US Route 460
- Blue Ridge Parkway

=== Rail ===
The closest passenger rail service is located in Roanoke.
