= Blue Ridge, Virginia =

- Census-designated place
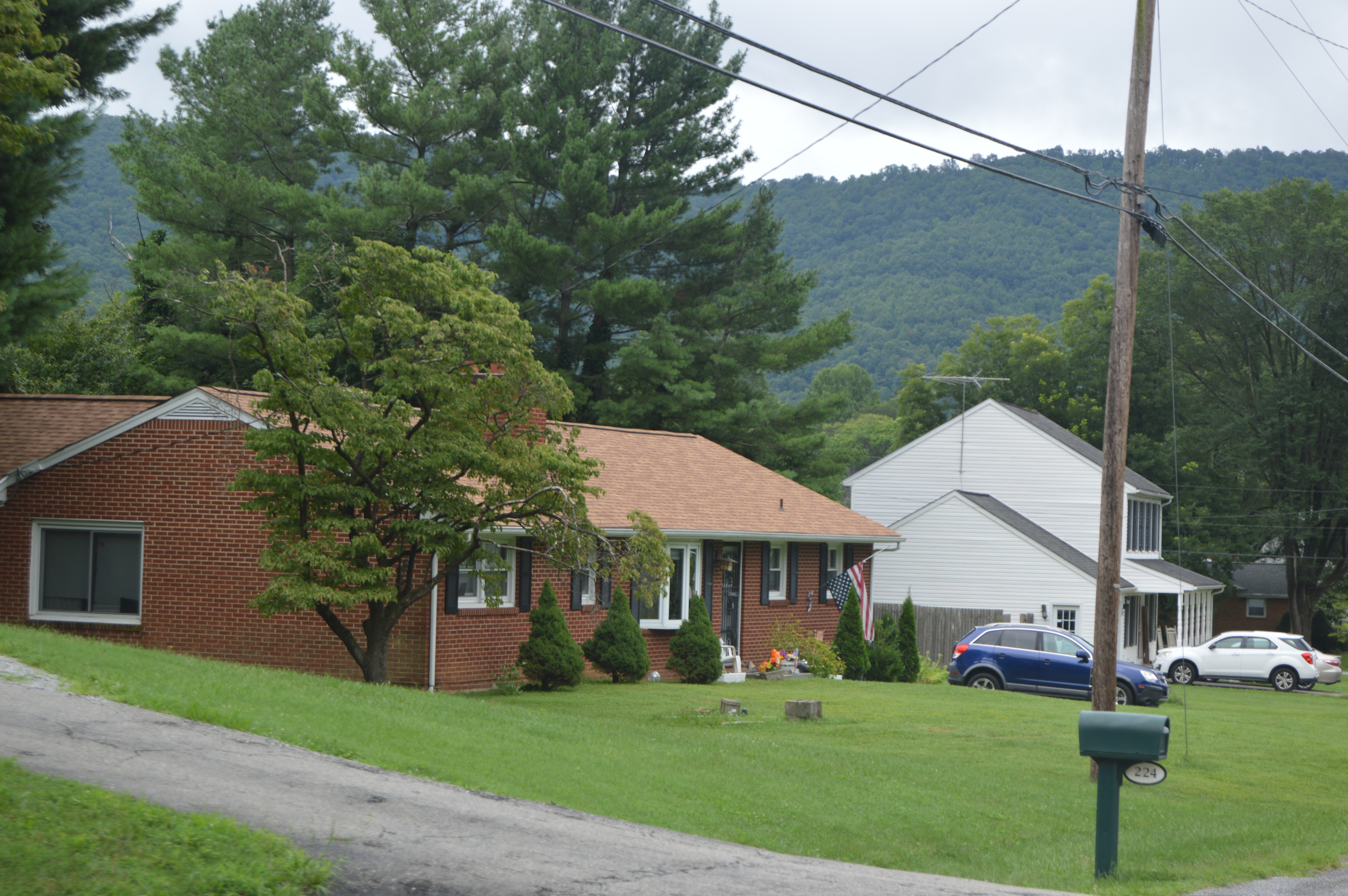
- Houses on Oak Drive

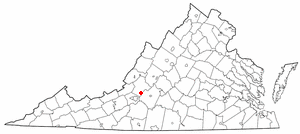
- Location of Blue Ridge, Virginia
- Coordinates: 37°22′19″N 79°48′59″W
- Country: United States
- State: Virginia
- County: Botetourt

Area
  - Total: 6.088 sq mi (15.77 km^{2})
  - Land: 6.087 sq mi (15.77 km^{2})
  - Water: 0.001 sq mi (0.0026 km^{2})
- Elevation: 1,263 ft (385 m)

Population (2020)
  - Total: 3,185
  - Density: 523.2/sq mi (202.0/km^{2})
- Time zone: UTC−5 (Eastern (EST))
  - Summer (DST): UTC−4 (EDT)
- ZIP Code: 24064
- Area codes: 540 and 826
- FIPS code: 51-08200
- GNIS feature ID: 1499150

Blue Ridge is a census-designated place (CDP) in southern Botetourt County, Virginia, United States. The population was 3,185 at the 2020 census. The CDP is located along U.S. Route 460. It is part of the Roanoke metropolitan area.

== Geography ==
According to the United States Census Bureau, the CDP has a total area of 6.088 square miles (15.77 km²).

== Demographics ==
Historical population
Census	Pop.	Note	%±
2000	3,188		—
2010	3,084		−3.3%
2020	3,185		3.3%
Source: U.S. Census Bureau

=== 2020 census ===
As of the 2020 census, Blue Ridge had a population of 3,185. The median age was 48.4 years. 21.0% of residents were under the age of 18 and 21.5% of residents were 65 years of age or older. For every 100 females there were 96.2 males, and for every 100 females age 18 and over there were 91.8 males age 18 and over.

75.2% of residents lived in urban areas, while 24.8% lived in rural areas.

There were 1,232 households in Blue Ridge, of which 30.0% had children under the age of 18 living in them. Of all households, 62.4% were married-couple households, 11.6% were households with a male householder and no spouse or partner present, and 20.6% were households with a female householder and no spouse or partner present. About 20.3% of all households were made up of individuals and 9.6% had someone living alone who was 65 years of age or older.

There were 1,318 housing units, of which 6.5% were vacant. The homeowner vacancy rate was 0.7% and the rental vacancy rate was 6.9%.

Racial composition as of the 2020 census
Race	Number	Percent
White	2,929	92.0%
Black or African American	93	2.9%
American Indian and Alaska Native	3	0.1%
Asian	17	0.5%
Native Hawaiian and Other Pacific Islander	0	0.0%
Some other race	15	0.5%
Two or more races	128	4.0%
Hispanic or Latino (of any race)	56	1.8%

=== Income and poverty ===
The 2020 American Community Survey 5-Year Estimates found that median income for a household in the CDP was $78,536, and the median income for a family was $86,714. 3.1% of the population were living below the poverty line, including 1.8% of those under 18 and 4.6% of those 65 and older.

=== 2010 census ===
As of the census of 2010, there were 3,084 people residing in the CDP. There were 1,269 housing units. The racial makeup of the CDP was 95.8% White, 2.6% African American, 0.2% Native American, 0.4% Asian, 0.0% Pacific Islander, 0.2% from other races, and 0.9% from two or more races. Hispanic or Latino of any race were 0.8% of the population.

=== 2000 census ===
As of the census of 2000, there were 3,188 people, 1,181 households, and 968 families residing in the CDP. The population density was 504.1 people per square mile (194.8/km²). There were 1,219 housing units at an average density of 192.8/sq mi (74.5/km²). The racial makeup of the CDP was 95.33% White, 2.85% African American, 0.22% Native American, 0.50% Asian, 0.06% from other race, and 1.04% from two or more races. Hispanic or Latino of any race were 0.53% of the population.

There were 1,181 households, out of which 34.8% had children under the age of 18 living with them, 72.5% were married couples living together, 6.9% had a female householder with no husband present, and 18.0% were non-families. 15.1% of all households were made up of individuals, and 6.1% had someone living alone who was 65 years of age or older. The average household size was 2.70 and the average family size was 2.99.

In the CDP, the population was spread out, with 25.0% under the age of 18, 4.9% from 18 to 24, 29.6% from 25 to 44, 30.1% from 45 to 64, and 10.5% who were 65 years of age or older. The median age was 40 years. For every 100 females there were 93.0 males. For every 100 females age 18 and over, there were 92.3 males.

The median income for a household in the CDP was $59,239, and the median income for a family was $63,926. Males had a median income of $39,226 versus $27,284 for females. The per capita income for the CDP was $24,683. None of the families and 2.4% of the population were living below the poverty line, including no under eighteens and 7.9% of those over 64.

== Economy ==
Blue Ridge is predominately a bedroom community of Roanoke and Salem, however there are some industrial employers within the community. Boxley Materials Company operates a large quarry along the Bedford-Botetourt border, Adams Construction Company operates an asphalt plant, and General Shale Brick operates a brickyard.

== Parks and recreation ==
Boxley Fields Park, a public park maintained by the Botetourt County Parks and Recreation Department is located in the CDP. The park is named after the Boxley Materials Company. The park includes baseball fields, a soccer field, a walking trail, and outdoor classroom.

Another county maintained park, Blue Ridge Park, is located just outside of the CDP. The park includes a baseball field, softball field, soccer field, basketball courts, tennis courts, walking trail, and paved track.

== Government ==
The United States Postal Service operates the Blue Ridge Post Office within the CDP. The Blue Ridge ZIP Code extends into parts of neighboring Bedford County.

== Education ==
The CDP is served by Botetourt County Public Schools. Public school students residing in Blue Ridge are zoned to attend Colonial Elementary School, Read Mountain Middle School, and Lord Botetourt High School.

Higher education institutions are located in Hollins and Roanoke.

== Infrastructure ==
Aqua Virginia operates a number of community water systems within Blue Ridge.

=== Public safety ===
Law enforcement is provided by the Botetourt County Sheriff's Office. Fire protection and emergency medical services are provided by the Botetourt County Department of Fire and EMS and the Blue Ridge Volunteer Fire Department and Rescue Squad, which operates a fire station within the CDP.

== Transportation ==
=== Air ===
The Roanoke-Blacksburg Regional Airport is the closest airport with commercial service to the CDP.

=== Highways ===
- U.S. Route 221 (Blue Ridge Boulevard)
- U.S. Route 460 (Blue Ridge Boulevard)
- Blue Ridge Parkway

=== Rail ===
The Norfolk Southern operated Blue Ridge District runs through the CDP. The closest passenger rail service is located in Roanoke.

== Notable people ==
- Susan Swecker, former chair of the Democratic Party of Virginia
