= Phoenix Bridge =

- U.S. National Register of Historic Places
- Virginia Landmarks Register
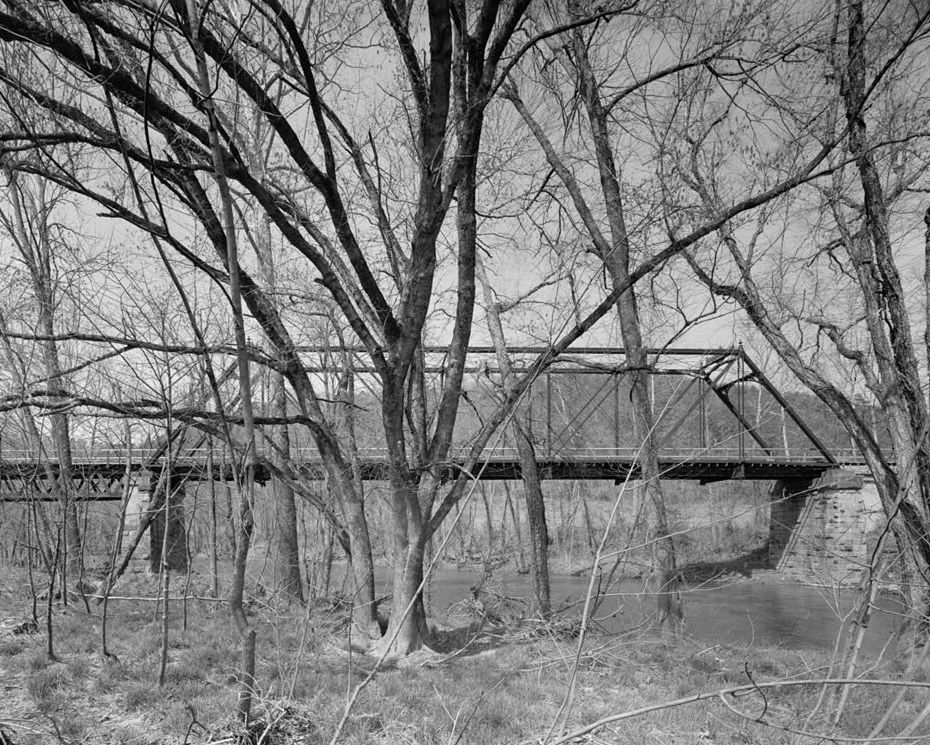
- Phoenix Bridge, HAER Photo, April 1994

- Location within Virginia Location within the United States
- Location: Ball Park Road (SR 685) Over Craig Creek, 2.6 miles (4.2 km) northwest of Eagle Rock, 0.8 miles (1.3 km) northwest of confluence of Patterson Creek and Craig Creek, near Eagle Rock, Virginia
- Coordinates: 37°38′57″N 79°49′52″W
- Area: less than one acre
- Built: 1887
- Built by: Phoenix Bridge Co.
- Architectural style: Trapezoidal Whipple Truss
- NRHP reference No.: 75002015
- VLR No.: 011-0095

Significant dates
- Added to NRHP: June 10, 1975
- Designated VLR: February 18, 1975

Phoenix Bridge is a historic metal trapezoidal Whipple truss railroad bridge spanning Craig Creek near Eagle Rock, Botetourt County, Virginia. It was built in 1887 by the Phoenix Bridge Company of Phoenixville, Pennsylvania. It consists of rolled wrought iron "Phoenix post" compression members and round and rectangular tension rods with pinned joints. It includes a cast panel embellished with anthemions and garlands, small urn-like finials, and quatrefoils and trefoils.

The bridge was listed on the National Register of Historic Places in 1975.

== See also ==
- List of bridges documented by the Historic American Engineering Record in Virginia
- List of bridges on the National Register of Historic Places in Virginia
