= Marshalltown (disambiguation) =

Marshalltown may refer to:

- Marshalltown, Iowa, United States
- Marshalltown, Virginia, United States
- Marshalltown, Nova Scotia, Canada
- Marshalltown, Johannesburg, South Africa
- the former name of Marshall, Victoria, a suburb of Geelong, Australia

== See also ==
- Marshallstown, County Down, a townland in County Down, Northern Ireland
