= Mount Union =

Mount Union may refer to some places in the United States:

- Mount Union, Iowa
- Mount Union, Pennsylvania
- Mount Union, Virginia
- University of Mount Union, a liberal arts university in Alliance, Ohio
- Mount Union (Arizona), a mountain in the Bradshaw Mountains
