= Oriskany =

Oriskany may refer to:

== Places ==
- Oriskany, New York, Oneida County
- Oriskany Creek, New York
- Oriskany Falls, New York, Oneida County
- Oriskany, Virginia

== Ships ==
- USS Oriskany (CV-34), an aircraft carrier
- Oriskany, a fruit cargo ship (see List of shipwrecks of the Isles of Scilly)

== Other ==
- Battle of Oriskany, American Revolution
- The Ridgeley sandstone of the central Appalachian Mountains in the United States, sometimes called or included in the Oriskany sandstone
