= Peaks of Otter =

Mountain in Virginia, USA

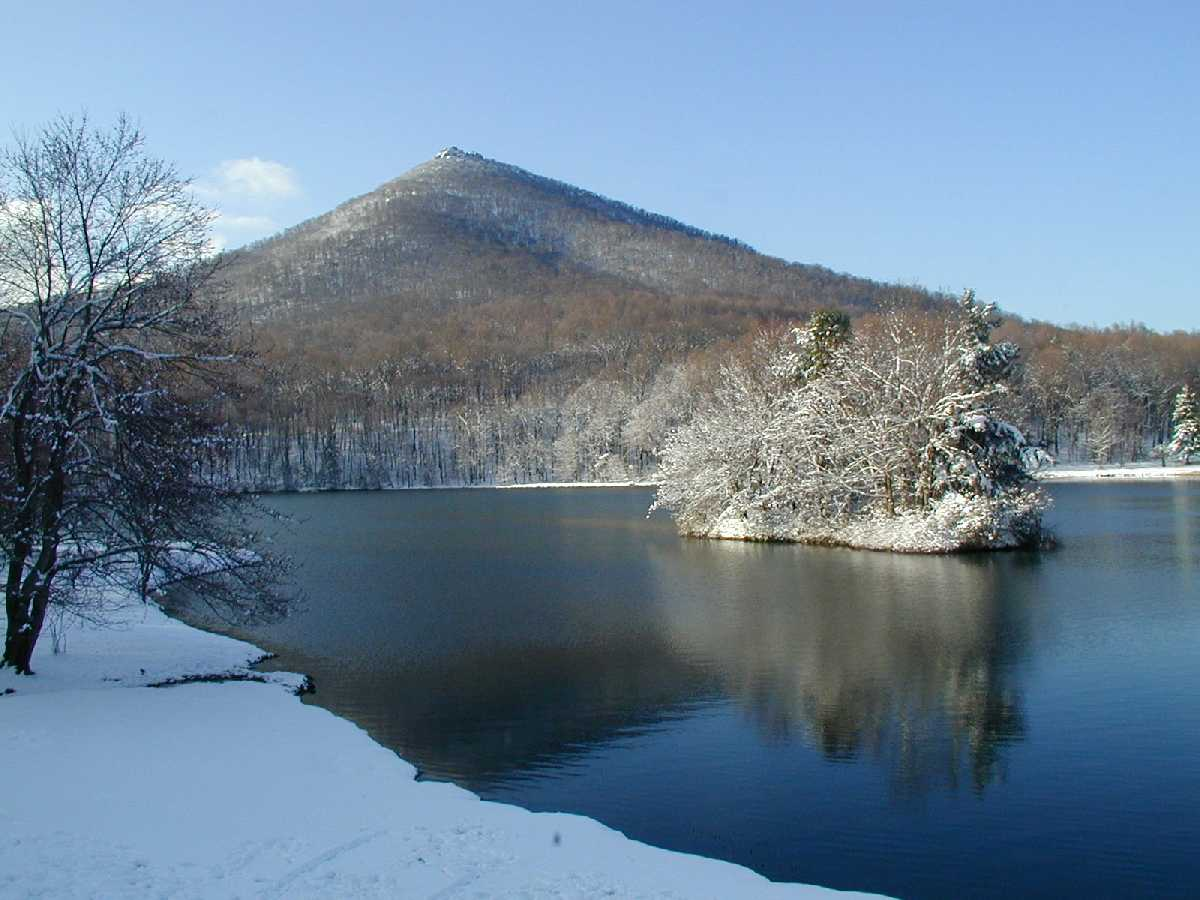
- Abbot Lake and Sharp Top in winter

Highest point
- Elevation: Sharp Top 3,875 feet (1,181 m); Flat Top 4,001 feet (1,220 m); Harkening Hill 3,372 feet (1,028 m)
- Coordinates: 37°26′49″N 79°35′01″W

Geography
- Location: Bedford / Botetourt counties, Virginia, U.S.
- Parent range: Blue Ridge Mountains
- Topo map: USGS

Geology
- Rock age: Precambrian
- Mountain type: granite

Climbing
- Easiest route: Hike

The Peaks of Otter are three mountain peaks in the Blue Ridge Mountains, overlooking the town of Bedford, Virginia, which lies nine miles (14 km) to the southeast along State Route 43. These peaks are Sharp Top, Flat Top, and Harkening Hill.

The manmade Abbott Lake lies in the valley surrounded by the three peaks, behind the Peaks of Otter Lodge and restaurant. The National Park Service preserves the peaks and lake as part of the Blue Ridge Parkway.

Thomas Jefferson once wrote that "the mountains of the Blue Ridge, and of these the Peaks of Otter, are thought to be of a greater height, measured from their base, than any others in our country, and perhaps in North America." Of course this later turned out not to be the case, but not before Virginia had sent stones from the peaks to be its part of the Washington Monument.

== History ==
At milepost marker 86 of the Blue Ridge Parkway stands the Peaks of Otter. Archaeological evidence under Abbott Lake indicates that Native Americans have been visiting the Peaks of Otter for at least 8,000 years for hunting, travel, and rest. European settlers started establishing the area in the mid-1700s. In 1766, Thomas Wood and his family from Pennsylvania settled a homestead on the area; National Park Service documents indicate other early residents included brothers Charles and Robert Ewing, who are asserted by some to have named the Peaks after the Ewing surname as it is pronounced in Scottish Gaelic – Clann Eóghain na h-Oitrich, or "Clan Ewing of Otter." This view may be given credence by similarly Otter-themed place names in Scotland, and the resemblance of Flat Top to Beinn Dorain in the ancestral Ewing area of Argyll and Bute. Other theories for the naming of the Peaks of Otter include the anglicizing of the Cherokee word "Otari" meaning "high places", or the naming of the mountains after the Otter River, which starts nearby and presumably got named for otters downstream.

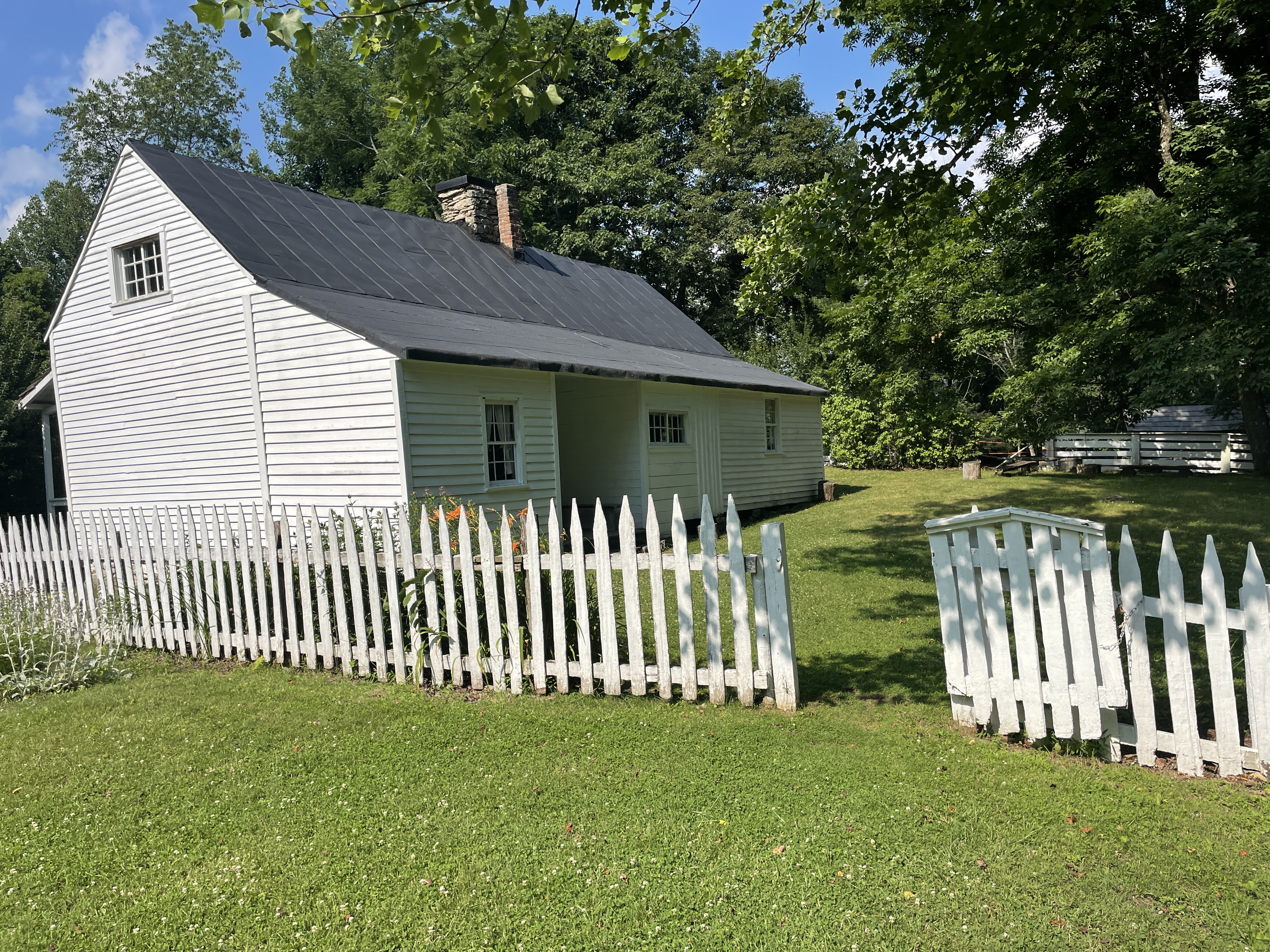
The Johnson Farm, one of the only remnants of the Peaks of Otter community. It was a four-room log cabin when the farm was bought in 1852 by John T. Johnson, whose descendants occupied it until the early 1940s.

In 1834, the first local inn was created by Polly Wood, a widow who opened an "Ordinary" in her log cabin where settlers could stay the night and get a warm meal. By the 1870s, Benjamin Wilkes had opened the famous Mons Hotel, and the Peaks of Otter was home to over 20 families, a school, a church, and the hotel. One of the families included the Johnson family, which lived for three generations until the 1930s on the now-preserved Johnson farmstead. By the early 1900s, the Peaks of Otter became a popular local tourist spot and became especially noticed by the National Park Service. Abbott Lake, the lake at the base of the peaks, was man made and created in 1964 along with the official Peaks of Otter Lodge, which still stands today.

== Activities ==
The primary activity at Peaks of Otter is hiking. There are three main peaks: Flat Top, Sharp Top, and Harkening Hill in order from highest peak altitude to lowest peak altitude. Flat Top is the tallest, and Harkening Hill is the smallest. Sharp Top is the most famous hike with its spectacular 360° view at the top. There is also a separate cliff formation on the other side of Sharp Top called Buzzard's Roost, which also has good views. For those who cannot hike 1.5 mile and 1,300 ft elevation gain trail up to the top of Sharp Top, there is a shuttle service that people up to within a 15-minute walk from the top. Combined within the three peaks is a little over 12 miles of hiking and extra attractions along the way. There is a flat, one-mile paved trail around Abbott Lake along with a 1.6-mile-loop trail to a waterfall roughly 2 miles north on the Blue Ridge Parkway. Johnson Farm is a historically restored site along one of the side trails towards Harkening Hill. The house and outbuildings are preserved in their 1930s form along with gardens and a small orchard. Visitors can take free tours of the farmhouse from June–September. From June–October the National Park Service provides various Ranger programs. There is also a small visitor center run by the National Park Service.

Lodging includes the Peaks of Otter Lodge and the Peaks of Otter campground. There is also a large picnic area with outdoor grills.

From atop the peaks, the nearbytown of Bedford can be seen. On the summit of the far side of Sharp Top is the site where a B-25 bomber crashed into the mountain during a training exercise during World War II. The wreckage was never removed, as it was too heavy and the side of the mountain was too steep to retrieve it. There is a small memorial on a rock at the top of the site, but the majority of the plane can still be found along the mountain. A bigger, more recent D-Day Memorial is located in Bedford.

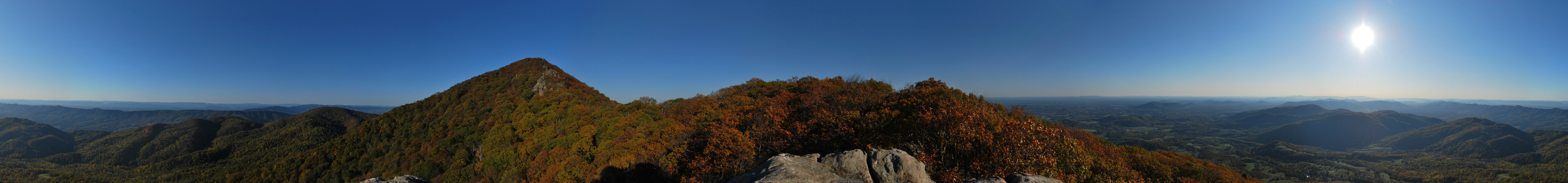
View of Sharp Top and the surrounding area from Buzzards Roost
