= Limitrophe Island =

Island in Palmer Archipelago, Antarctica

- Location within Antarctica

Geography
- Location: Antarctica
- Coordinates: 64°48′S 64°01′W
- Archipelago: Palmer Archipelago

Administration
- Administered under the Antarctic Treaty System

Demographics
- Population: Uninhabited

Limitrophe Island is an oval-shaped Antarctic island 0.9 kilometres (0.5 nmi) long, lying directly east of Christine Island and 1.9 kilometres (1 nmi) south of Anvers Island. Limitrophe Island was given a suggestive name by Palmer Station personnel in 1972, because Limitrophe Island lies at the limit of normal field operations from the station.

== See also ==
- Composite Antarctic Gazetteer
- List of Antarctic and sub-Antarctic islands
- List of Antarctic islands south of 60° S
- SCAR
- Territorial claims in Antarctica
