= Baldwin, Virginia =

Unincorporated community in Virginia, United States

Baldwin
- Unincorporated community
- Location within the Commonwealth of Virginia Baldwin (the United States)
- Coordinates: 37°44′23″N 79°51′02″W
- Country: United States
- State: Virginia
- County: Botetourt
- Time zone: UTC−5 (Eastern (EST))
  - Summer (DST): UTC−4 (EDT)

Baldwin is an unincorporated community in Botetourt County, Virginia, United States.
