= Stepping Stones (islands) =

Islet group in Palmer Archipelago, Antarctica

The Stepping Stones are three prominent rocks lying 0.8 km (0.5 mi) north of Limitrophe Island, off the southwest coast of Anvers Island, Antarctica. The Stepping Stones are located at 64°47′S 64°00′W. The Stepping Stones form one of a series of small boat refuges for parties working between nearby Palmer Station and Biscoe Bay, and therefore form "stepping stones" for coastal trips. Named by Palmer Station personnel in 1972.

== See also ==
- List of Antarctic and sub-Antarctic islands
