= Salisbury, Virginia =

Unincorporated community in Virginia, United States

Salisbury
- Unincorporated community
- Location within the Commonwealth of Virginia Salisbury (the United States)
- Coordinates: 37°36′27″N 79°46′56″W
- Country: United States
- State: Virginia
- County: Botetourt
- Time zone: UTC−5 (Eastern (EST))
  - Summer (DST): UTC−4 (EDT)

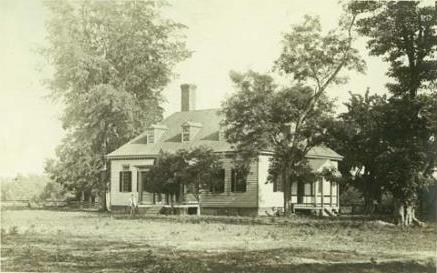
Salisbury House in 1888

Salisbury is an unincorporated community in Botetourt County, Virginia, United States.
