= Springwood, Virginia =

Unincorporated community in Virginia, United States

Springwood
- Unincorporated community
- Location within the Commonwealth of Virginia Springwood (the United States)
- Coordinates: 37°32′56″N 79°44′41″W
- Country: United States
- State: Virginia
- County: Botetourt
- Time zone: UTC−5 (Eastern (EST))
  - Summer (DST): UTC−4 (EDT)

Springwood is an unincorporated community in Botetourt County, Virginia, United States. Located in the northern part of the Roanoke Valley and at the southern tip of the Shenandoah Valley, Springwood is part of the Roanoke Metropolitan Area and sits along the banks of the James River.

== Geography and History ==
Springwood is located in the Northern half of Botetourt County, about halfway between Buchanan and Fincastle. It is primarily rural, with Springwood road serving as the main thoroughfare. The community is defined by the surrounding Blue Ridge Mountains and the presence of the James River that flows near the historic center of town.

It was called Hickory, or Jackson, before it was renamed to Springwood. Lifelong resident Lynwood Hayth was quoted by the Roanoke Times in 1978, saying: “The place was called Old Hickory then, and it was also known as Jackson, in honor of Andrew Jackson. But they changed the name to Springwood because in those days they did a lot of tomato canning in this country, and one time later the railroad took the cans to Jackson, KY, by mistake.”

Springwood formerly hosted a post office and a small downtown area that straddled Springwood Road, though all that remains are a few churches and the Odd Fellows Lodge. There is also a small airport and glider strip located on a hill overlooking the James River that regularly has small local flights. Springwood is best known, however, for its prominence in watersports. Given the community's location on the banks of the James River, it is a popular spot for fishing, canoeing, and kayaking, with a canoeing/kayaking route connecting Springwood with neighboring Arcadia and Buchanan. The Springwood area is also a popular deer and turkey hunting spot in the Roanoke Valley given its abundance of fields, farm lands, and woods.

== Education ==
Springwood is served by Botetourt County Public Schools. Most notably, it is the location of James River High School, which has a Buchanan mailing address due to Springwood's lack of a post office. Students living in Springwood will attend either Breckinridge Elementary School in Fincastle or Buchanan Elementary School in Buchanan, and Central Academy Middle School (also in Fincastle) before attending James River.
