= Daggers Springs, Virginia =

Unincorporated community in Virginia, United States

Daggers Springs
- Unincorporated community
- Location within the Commonwealth of Virginia Daggers Springs (the United States)
- Coordinates: 37°41′08″N 79°45′42″W
- Country: United States
- State: Virginia
- County: Botetourt
- Time zone: UTC−5 (Eastern (EST))
  - Summer (DST): UTC−4 (EDT)

Daggers Springs is an unincorporated community in Botetourt County, Virginia, United States.

An 1855 gazetteer noted that it was a "post-village" where "extensive buildings have been erected for the entertainment of the public."
