= Hellgate 100k =

Ultramarathon in Virginia, United States

- Date: Second weekend of December
- Location: Jefferson National Forest, Central Virginia, United States
- Event type: Ultramarathon trail run
- Distance: 66.6-mile (107.2 km)
- Established: 2003
- Course records: Brian Culmo (male) - 10:10:38 (2023); Rachel Spaulding (female)- 11:59:06 (2021)

The Hellgate 100k is an annual ultramarathon, held in the second weekend of December in the Jefferson National Forest, in Central Virginia, United States. It was established in 2003 by esteemed ultramarathon runner David Horton. The race is 66.6 miles (107.2 km), in reference to the Number of the beast, and commences at the parking lot to the Glenwood Horse Trail next to Big Hellgate Creek, near Glasgow, and ends at Camp Bethel, near Nace in the southwest.

Due to the rugged terrain of the Blue Ridge Mountains, with a range of steep climbs and descents, icy trails and perishing December temperatures, Hellgate is known for being as demanding as 100 mile ultramarathons.

== History ==
Hellgate was first held in 2003, established by esteemed ultramarathon runner David Horton, with the assistance of Charlie Hesse and Dr. George Wortley. Horton competed in 160 ultramarathons over 33 years and set the record for the Appalachian Trail in 1991. The event is a qualifier for the Western States Endurance Run.

Rachel Spaulding set the female record for the course in 2021 with a time of 11 hours, 59 minutes and 6 seconds, becoming the first woman ever to break 12 hours. Brian Culmo set the male record in 2023 with a time of 10 hours, 10 minutes and 38 seconds. David Goggins competed in the Hellgate 100k in 2010, 2013 and 2015, finishing in fifth place with a time 11 hours, 56 minutes and 2 seconds in the latter.

== Course ==
Due to the terrain and physical demands of traversing the Blue Ridge Mountains, with a range of steep climbs and descents and icy trails and perishing December temperatures, Hellgate is described as being as demanding as a 100-mile race.

The race starts at 12:01 a.m. on the second Saturday in December at Glenwood Horse Trail in the parking lot next to Big Hellgate Creek, in close proximity to Glasgow, Virginia. It passes the Petites Gap at 8 miles, Overstreet Falls at 21.3 miles, Jennings Creek at 29 miles and Little Cove Mountain at 35.1 miles. There are nine aid stations en route, with the two most important aid stations being at Floyd's Field (22.5 miles) and Bearwallow Gap (42.5 miles). The course crosses the Appalachian Trail and Blue Ridge Parkway four times. It ends at Camp Bethel, to the northeast of Nace, off Virginia State Route 640 in the southwest.

The ultramarathon organizers set time limits on reaching Floyd's Field by 6:40 a.m. and Bearwallow Gap by 12:30 p.m. Failure to comply with the restrictions leads to disqualification from the race.
