= Rocky Point, Virginia =

Unincorporated community in Virginia, United States

Rocky Point
- Unincorporated community
- Location within the Commonwealth of Virginia Rocky Point (the United States)
- Coordinates: 37°34′46″N 79°36′42″W
- Country: United States
- State: Virginia
- County: Botetourt
- Time zone: UTC−5 (Eastern (EST))
  - Summer (DST): UTC−4 (EDT)

Rocky Point is an unincorporated community in Botetourt County, Virginia, United States.

== History ==
Rocky Point was one of 38 post offices in Botetourt County in 1893, according to the Fincastle Herald. By the early 20th century, Rocky Point was a small hamlet. Rocky Point's population was 15 in 1900, 14 in 1909, and 14 in 1925.

Starting in 1918, the Librerty Lime and Stone Company began mining in Rocky Point. A spur line of the Chesapeake and Ohio Railway reached its terminus at the mine.
