= Island hopping (disambiguation) =

Island hopping is a military strategy used in the Pacific during World War II

Island hopping may also refer to:

- Carnival Cruise Line Tycoon 2005: Island Hopping, a business simulation game
- Island Hopping, an early version of the board game Coin Hopping—Washington D.C.

== See also ==
- Island Hopper
- Hop Island, an island of the Rauer Islands, Antarctica
- Stepping stone (disambiguation)
