= Coyner Springs, Virginia =

Unincorporated community in Virginia, United States

Coyner Springs
- Unincorporated community
- Location within the Commonwealth of Virginia Coyner Springs (the United States)
- Coordinates: 37°20′04″N 79°51′32″W
- Country: United States
- State: Virginia
- County: Botetourt

Population (2000)
  - Total: 99,068 (2,020)
- Time zone: UTC−5 (Eastern (EST))
  - Summer (DST): UTC−4 (EDT)

Coyner Springs is an unincorporated community in Botetourt County, Virginia, United States.
