= Eagle Rock, Virginia =

- CDP
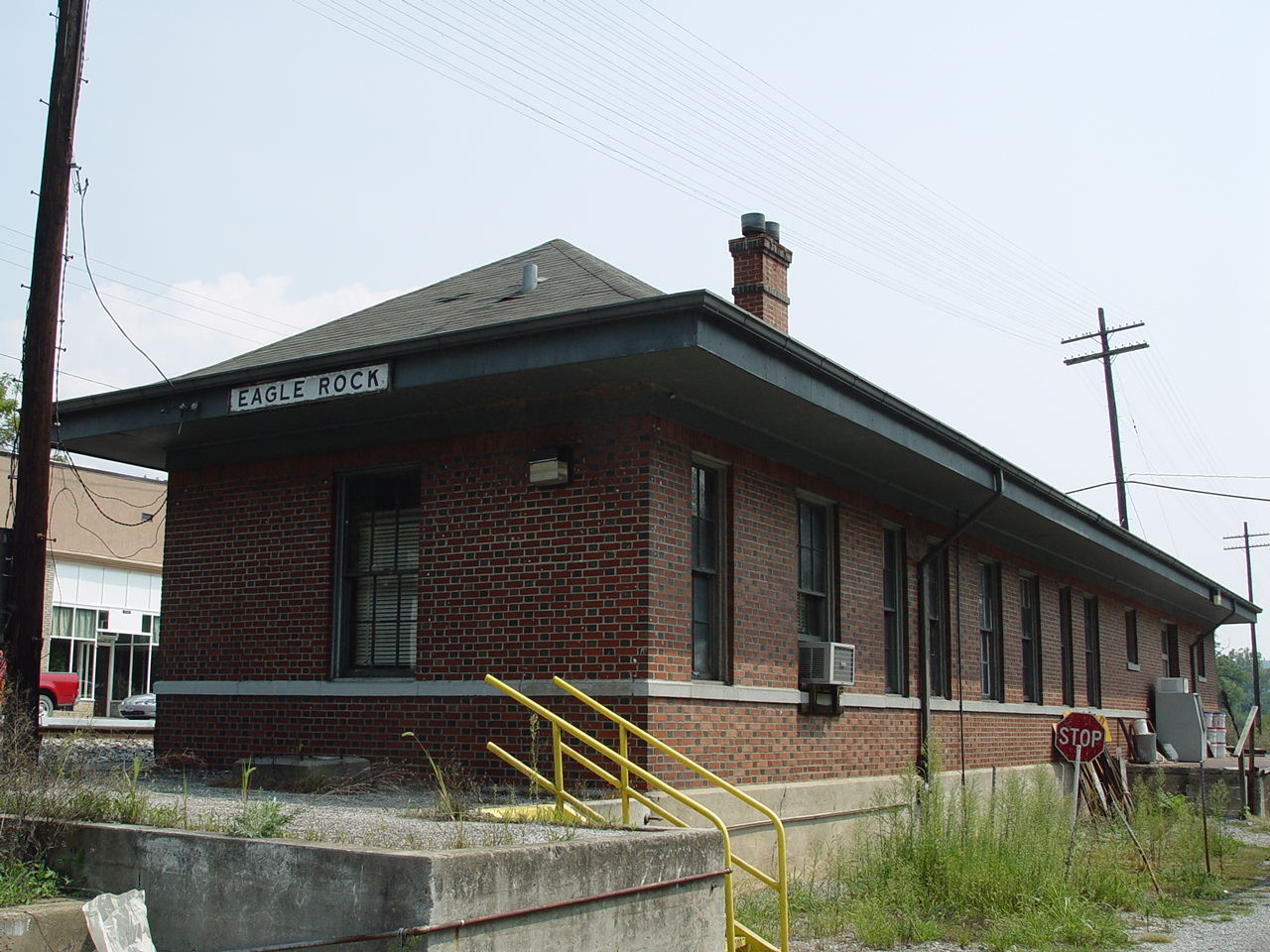
- Eagle Rock Depot

- Location of Eagle Rock in Virginia Eagle Rock, Virginia (the United States)
- Coordinates: 37°38′26″N 79°48′04″W
- Country: United States
- State: Virginia
- County: Botetourt

Area
  - Total: 0.71 sq mi (1.84 km^{2})
  - Land: 0.71 sq mi (1.84 km^{2})
  - Water: 0 sq mi (0 km^{2})
- Elevation: 971 ft (296 m)

Population (2020)
  - Total: 209
  - Density: 294/sq mi (114/km^{2})
- Time zone: UTC-5 (Eastern (EST))
  - Summer (DST): UTC-4 (EDT)
- ZIP code: 24085
- Area code: 540
- FIPS code: 51-51023
- GNIS feature ID: 1494212
- Other names: Breckenridge, Eagle Mountain, Eaglerock, Rat Hole; Sheets

Eagle Rock is a census-designated place (CDP) in Botetourt County, Virginia, United States, located along the James River between Iron Gate and Buchanan. It was first listed as a CDP in the 2020 census with a population of 209.

== History ==
Eagle Rock had the last lock of the James River and Kanawha Canal.

=== Lime production ===
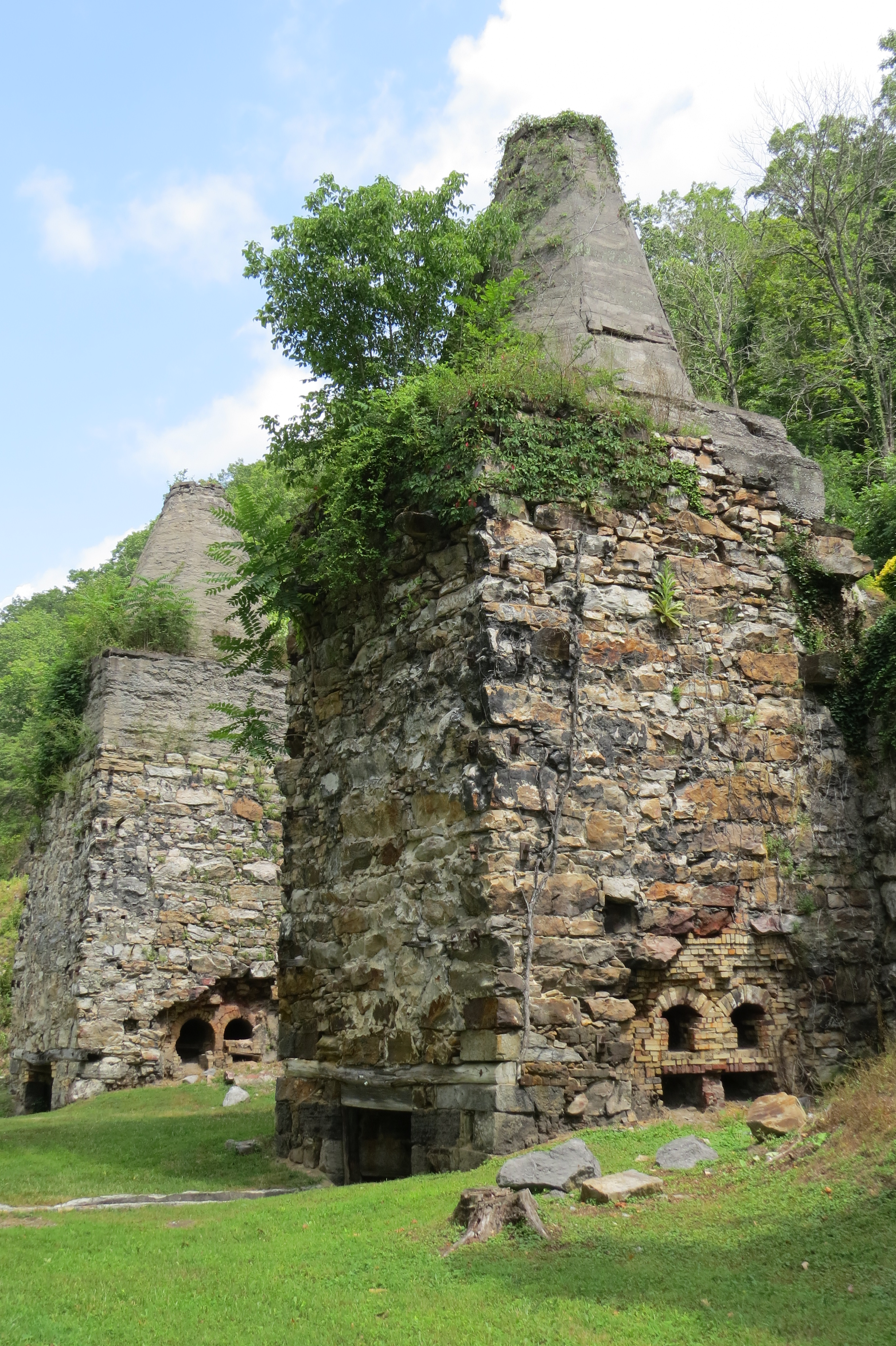
19th century limestone kiln in Eagle Rock, Virginia.

This was the location of the kilns for making lime. Limestone was transported across the James River via a tram system and then burned in the kilns to make lime. Originally a river ford, known as "The Free Stone Ford", allowed mule drawn wagons to cross. In May 1884 a bridge was constructed across the river for the limestone. Later, large towers were constructed and the lime sent across the river by cable. Old quarries and locally known Quarry Hill are located on either side of US 220. The Bessemer Archaeological Site, Phoenix Bridge, and Roaring Run Furnace are listed on the National Register of Historic Places.

=== Rail history ===
At the end of the James River and Kanawha Canal system, transportation was done by rail. Eagle Rock was the point of convergence of the Richmond and Alleghany Railroad (soon to be known as the Chesapeake and Ohio Railway, and later CSX Transportation) and the Craig Valley Line, which ran to Surber Station and on to New Castle, Virginia.

== Geography ==
Eagle Rock is located at 37°38′26″N 79°48′04″W (37.6422510, −079.7918942).

According to the United States Census Bureau, the CDP has a total area of 0.71 square mile, all land.

== Demographics ==
Historical population
Census	Pop.	Note	%±
2020	209		—
Source: U.S. Census Bureau

Eagle Rock first appeared as a census designated place in the 2020 U.S. census.

As of the census of 2020, there were 209 people residing in the CDP. The population density was 290 people per square mile (110 people/km^{2}). There were 102 housing units. The racial makeup of the CDP was 93.7% White, 0% Black or African American, 0% Native American, 0% Asian, 0% Pacific Islander, 0% from other races, and 6.3% from two or more races. 1.3% of the population were Hispanic or Latino of any race.

== Education ==
The CDP is served by Botetourt County Public Schools. Eagle Rock had its own high school until the late 1950s, when the Northern Botetourt high schools were all consolidated into the newly formed James River High School in neighboring Springwood. Public school students residing in Eagle Rock attend Eagle Rock Elementary School, Central Academy Middle School, and James River High School.

== Notable people ==
- William Hanes Ayres (1916–2000), U.S. Congressman from Ohio who served ten terms in the House, was born in Eagle Rock
- Norvel Lee, (1924–1992) Olympic boxer who represented the United States at the 1948 Summer Olympics in London and won a gold medal at the 1952 Summer Olympics in Helsinki
- Angela Tincher, All-American softball pitcher for James River High School and Virginia Tech

== Bibliography ==
- Eagle Rock Funeral Home, Craig-Botetourt Genealogy Club, and Fincastle Library. Eagle Rock Funeral Home. Fincastle, VA: Craig-Botetourt Genealogy Club & Fincastle Library, 2005. Notes: Copies of burial records of Eagle Rock Funeral Home, Eagle Rock, Virginia.
- Eagle Rock High School (Eagle Rock, Va.). The Eagle. [Virginia]: Eagle Rock High School, 1933.
- Eagle Rock School, and Eagle Rock Public Library. A History of Eagle Rock: A Special Group Project. Eagle Rock, Virginia: [Eagle Rock School], 1975. Notes: A history of Eagle Rock, Virginia (Botetourt County) written by students and their teacher in the mid-1970s (at the now closed Eagle Rock School). Credits: Kevin Barger, David Dew, Susan Heck, Cheryl Hoy, Johnny Lawson, Charles Nelson, Gary Tingler, Kathy Waddell, Kim West, Stacy Zimmerman, Mrs. Mary Lynne Leffel, teacher. Contents: Location and names – Industries – Stores – Saloons, hotel, theatre – Houses – Schools – Churches – Floods and fires – The Kanawha Canal – Summary.
- Galatia Presbyterian Church (Eagle Rock, Va.). Church Records. [Virginia?]: Eastern Microfilm, 1967. The church was originally part of Locust Bottom Church which was divided in 1887 into two churches, Galatia and Glen Wilton.
- McGuire, Odell S. Geology of the Eagle Rock, Strom, Oriskany, and Salisbury Quadrangles, Virginia. Charlottesville: Virginia Division of Mineral Resources, 1970.
- Russ, Kurt C., John M. McDaniel, and Jeffrey P. Blomster. Archaeological Investigations of a Nineteenth Century Appalachian Farmstead: The Barger/Riddlebarger Farm in Botetourt County, Virginia. Lexington, Va: Laboratory of Anthropology, Washington and Lee University, 1987. Notes: Project conducted under contract with the Museum of American Frontier Culture, Staunton, Va. Described as "Historic farmstead site" with "Site number 44BO (site number not yet established) (see Architectural Survey Form #11-107" in Virginia Division of Historic Landmarks, Archaeological Site Inventory Form on p. [2] of cover.
- United States. Flood Plain Information: James River, Eagle Rock to Lick Run, Botetourt County, Virginia. Norfolk, Va: Corps of Engineers, U.S. Army, Norfolk, Virginia, District, 1971.
