= Christine Muller-Schwarze =

American psychologist

Christine Muller-Schwarze (also Müller-Schwarze) was an American psychologist from Utah State University and the first American scientist to work on the Antarctic mainland.

== Antarctic work ==
She accompanied her husband, Dietland Muller-Schwarze, a biologist, to Cape Crozier on Ross Island. Flying from Christchurch, New Zealand, on 15 October 1969, they arrived in Antarctica to study Adelie penguins at Cape Crozier, some 50 miles from the American McMurdo Station. Four other American scientists joined Muller-Schwarze three weeks later. For a time, the couple shared a field cabin with other scientists but later had their own collapsible fibreglass igloo. In the early 1970s, they also worked on Christine Island whose name was proposed in Christine's honour by her husband who worked for the U.S. Antarctic Research Program (USARP).

Jones and six other women scientists were flown to the South Pole on 12 November 1969 but Muller-Schwarze declined the trip as she was too busy with her penguins.

Muller-Schwarze and her husband studied the behaviour of the predator-prey relationships between the leopard seal and the south polar skua as well as the prophylactic and defensive behaviour of Adelie penguins, showing that when dispersed by a leopard seal attack, the penguins remain motionless for long periods.

Together with her husband, Muller-Schwarze published her findings on penguins in Pinguine (in German), first published in 1975.
