= Stepstone (disambiguation) =

Stepstone can refer to:

- Step-stone bridge, a rudimentary bridge
- StepStone, an online careersite
- Stepstone, a now-defunct software company
- Stepstone, Kentucky

== See also ==
- Stepping stone (disambiguation)
