= Spec, Virginia =

Unincorporated community in Virginia, United States

Spec
- Unincorporated community
- Location within the Commonwealth of Virginia Spec (the United States)
- Coordinates: 37°27′16″N 79°46′17″W
- Country: United States
- State: Virginia
- County: Botetourt
- Time zone: UTC−5 (Eastern (EST))
  - Summer (DST): UTC−4 (EDT)

Spec is an unincorporated community in Botetourt County, Virginia, United States.
