= Christine Island =

Island in the Palmer Archipelago, Antarctica

- Location within Antarctica

Geography
- Location: Antarctica
- Coordinates: 64°48′S 64°02′W
- Archipelago: Palmer Archipelago
- Length: 0.9 km (0.56 mi)

Administration
- Administered under the Antarctic Treaty System

Demographics
- Population: Uninhabited

Christine Island is an island 0.9 km (0.5 nmi) long which lies 1.9 km (1 nmi) off the south coast of Anvers Island and 2.8 km (1.5 nmi) southeast of Bonaparte Point. The name of Christine Island was proposed by the United States Antarctic Research Program (USARP) biologist Dietland Müller-Schwarze after his wife Christine Müller-Schwarze, who studied Adélie penguins with him on the island in 1971–1972.

== See also ==
- Composite Antarctic Gazetteer
- List of Antarctic and sub-Antarctic islands
- List of Antarctic islands south of 60° S
- SCAR
- Territorial claims in Antarctica
