= Nace, Virginia =

Unincorporated community in Virginia, United States

Nace
- Unincorporated community
- Location within the Commonwealth of Virginia Nace (the United States)
- Coordinates: 37°26′22″N 79°49′26″W
- Country: United States
- State: Virginia
- County: Botetourt
- Time zone: UTC−5 (Eastern (EST))
  - Summer (DST): UTC−4 (EDT)

Nace is an unincorporated community in Botetourt County, Virginia, United States.

The small town was originally known as "Houston", but "As for the name Nace, that was in honor of George Washington Fayette Nace, a prominent local farmer born Feb. 1, 1822, and died Aug. 19, 1890."

The town had an orchard, truck farms (otherwise known as Market gardens), and a tomato cannery. The cannery was owned by E. C. Firestone, and was known as the Firestone Canning Corporation.

== Geology ==
The small Brachiopod Acrotreta buttsi (n. sp). is found in the Rome Formation. "Growth lines are clear, but other surface markings appear to be lacking. Interior impressions have a straight depression extending more than half the length of the valve. Lower Cambrian, Rome; (loc. 17h) at C. and 0. Station, Waynesboro; and (100. 25v) half a mile south of Nace, Virginia ..."

The town also had an iron mine nearby. "Getting back to the town’s first name, that came from an iron mining operation up the mountain from there. Artifacts of the mine are still scattered at the site, Jack Rader said. Houston Mine was a property of Tredegar Iron Works of Richmond, at one time one of the largest manufacturing facilities in the South. The company provided ordnance to the Confederacy and helped further the statewide railroad building boom after the Civil War. An affiliated business of the mine was Crozier Iron & Steel in Roanoke, which provided materials for the Norfolk and Western Railway in its early days during the late 19th century."

There was also a small dairy and some Manganese mining in Nace.

== Sports ==
The Hellgate 100k ultramarathon, held on the second weekend of December each year, ends to the northeast of Nace at Camp Bethel, off Virginia State Route 640.

== Transportation ==
The town had a railway station at milepost 225 for the Shenandoah Valley Railroad and had a US Post Office from 1883 to 1964.

A portion of Virginia State Route 640 in Botetourt County is still known locally as "Nace Road". "Alternating lane closures will be in place on a section of Route 11 from 1 mile north of Route 640 (Nace Rd.) to the I-81 on Ramp at Exit 162 for milling, paving and pavement marking operations."
