= Mount Union, Virginia =

Unincorporated community in Virginia, United States

Mount Union
- Unincorporated community
- Location within the Commonwealth of Virginia Mount Union (the United States)
- Coordinates: 37°27′06″N 79°58′12″W
- Country: United States
- State: Virginia
- County: Botetourt
- Time zone: UTC−5 (Eastern (EST))
  - Summer (DST): UTC−4 (EDT)

Mount Union is one of the 48 unincorporated communities located in Botetourt County, Virginia, United States.
