= Arcadia, Botetourt County, Virginia =

Unincorporated community in Virginia, United States

Arcadia
- Unincorporated community
- Location within the Commonwealth of Virginia Arcadia (the United States)
- Coordinates: 37°32′43″N 79°37′26″W
- Country: United States
- State: Virginia
- County: Botetourt
- Time zone: UTC−5 (Eastern (EST))
  - Summer (DST): UTC−4 (EDT)

Arcadia is an unincorporated community in Botetourt County, Virginia, United States. It is located in the north of the county and is one of the northernmost points of the Roanoke Metropolitan Area.

== Outdoor recreation ==
Arcadia sits just off the exit of Interstate 81 and is in proximity to both the George Washington National Forest and a number of trout fishing streams, including Jennings Creek and North Creek. Arcadia is also bounded by the James River and is a key access point for kayaking, canoeing, and other types of recreational activities along the river. As such, Arcadia is well known in the Roanoke Valley as a great recreational place for mountain biking, hiking, fishing, hunting, and watersport activities.

== Business ==
There are a few companies that do business in the Arcadia area, including Shell Oil Company, Twin River Outfitters, the Watstull Inn, and Foot of the Mountain Café, a popular local restaurant.
