= James River High School (Buchanan, Virginia) =

Location
- 9906 Springwood Road; Buchanan, Virginia 24066; United States; 37°32′53″N 79°43′42″W

Information
- School type: Public, high school
- Established: 1959
- School district: Botetourt County Public Schools
- Superintendent: John Busher
- Principal: Lisa Taylor
- Staff: 39.54 (FTE)
- Grades: 9-12
- Enrollment: 548 (2017-18)
- Student to teacher ratio: 13.86
- Colors: Red, Black, White
- Athletics conference: Three Rivers District; Region C Conference 38; Region 2A West
- Nickname: Knights
- Rival: Lord Botetourt
- Website: Official Site

James River High School (JRHS) is a Group-2A-size public high school in Buchanan, Virginia. It serves the northern part of Botetourt County, including the towns of Buchanan, Eagle Rock, Fincastle, and Springwood. James River was founded in 1959 with the consolidation of the Buchanan, Eagle Rock, and Fincastle high schools.

== FFA Organization ==
In June 2017, the James River FFA Chapter was named the #1 FFA Chapter in Virginia through the National Chapter Award. In October 2017, the chapter was named as a Model of Excellence Finalist and one of the top 10 FFA Chapters in the country.

== Sports ==
James River athletes are referred to as the "Knights" and they compete in the Three Rivers District against similarly sized schools in the Roanoke and New River Valleys. James River is classified as a Class 2, Region C school by the Virginia High School League for Regional and State competitions.

The Knights have captured four Group A State Championships in Women's Softball in 2003, 2004, 2006, and 2011. Pitcher Angela Tincher graduated from James River before having an All-American college career and playing professional softball. The Knights also won states in Group A Men's Basketball in 2010. James River has a successful volleyball team, winning the State Championship in 2010.

== Drama ==
JRHS advanced to the Virginia State Theatre Competition in Charlottesville in 2007. The "Knightly" players won second in the Region C Theatre Competition earlier in November 2007.

== Marching band ==
The James River Marching Knight Band is under the direction of Robert Chaplin. The Marching Knights participate in many competitions around the area and have received many achievements over the years.

Recent Shows include: Time After Time (2019), Pursuit of the Throne (2021), Haunted (2022), Caliente (2023), Unbreakable (2024), and The Haunted Music Box (2025).

== Notable alumni ==
- Angela Tincher, Akron Racers professional softball pitcher
- Matthew Ramsey, songwriter and lead vocalist of Old Dominion
