= Stepping Stone, Virginia =

Unincorporated community in Virginia, United States

Stepping Stone
- Unincorporated community
- Location within the Commonwealth of Virginia Stepping Stone (the United States)
- Coordinates: 37°20′52″N 79°50′58″W
- Country: United States
- State: Virginia
- County: Botetourt
- Time zone: UTC−5 (Eastern (EST))
  - Summer (DST): UTC−4 (EDT)

Stepping Stone is an unincorporated community in Botetourt County, Virginia, United States.
