= Captain, Virginia =

Unincorporated community in Virginia, United States

- Unincorporated community
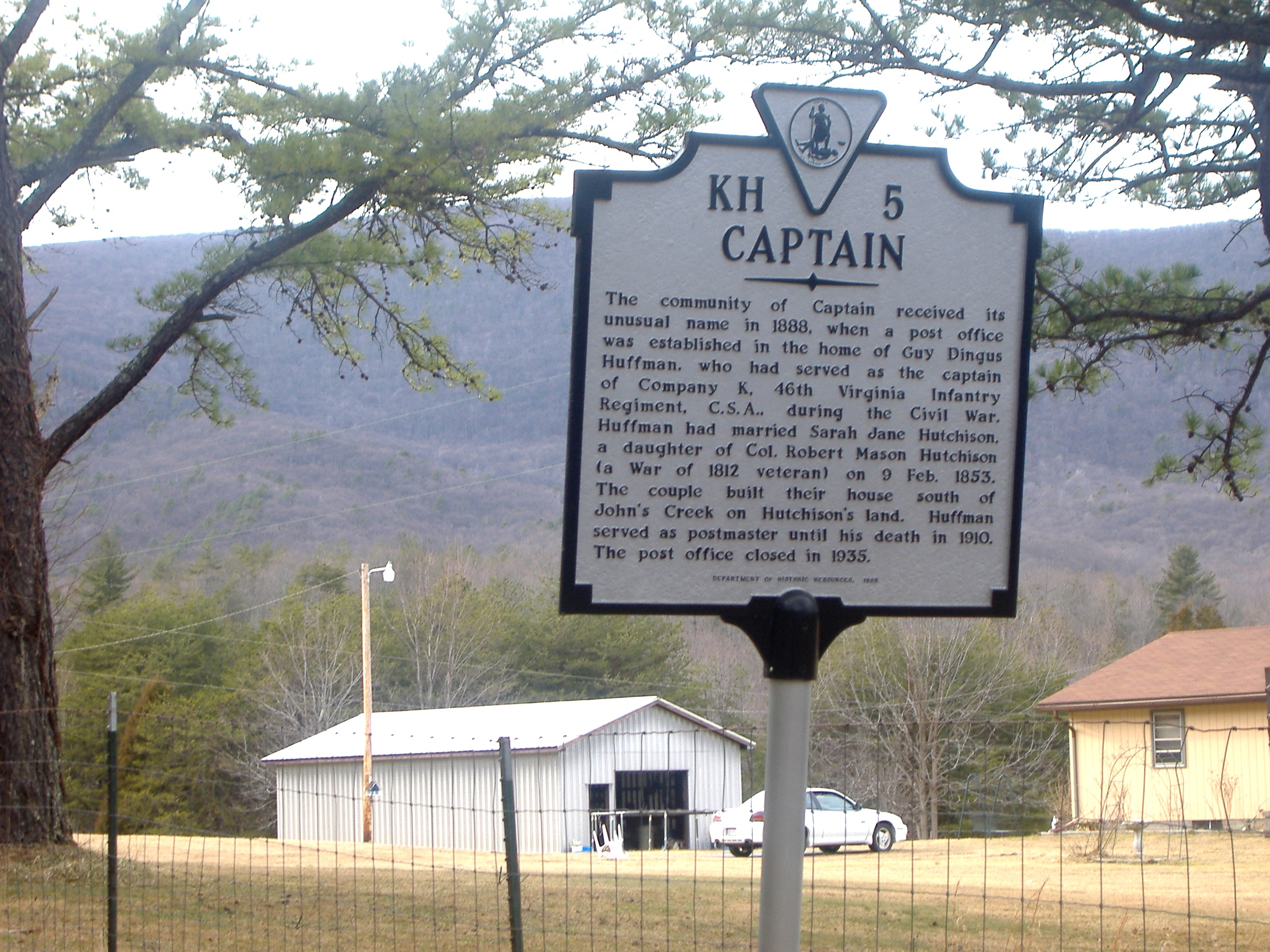
- Historical marker in Captain, detailing the history of the town name

- Location in Virginia
- Coordinates: 37°23′32″N 080°27′17″W
- Country: United States
- State: Virginia
- County: Craig
- Elevation: 2,037 ft (621 m)
- Time zone: UTC-5 (Eastern (EST))
  - Summer (DST): UTC-4 (EDT)
- ZIP code: 24127
- Area code: 540
- GNIS ID: 1482318

Captain is an unincorporated community in western Craig County, Virginia, United States. It lies at the intersection of Johns Creek Road and Rocky Gap Trail.
