= Marshalltown, Virginia =

- Unincorporated community
- Location in Virginia Marshalltown (the United States)
- Coordinates: 37°32′17″N 080°03′35″W
- Country: United States
- State: Virginia
- County: Craig
- Elevation: 1,250 ft (381 m)
- Time zone: UTC-5 (Eastern (EST))
  - Summer (DST): UTC-4 (EDT)
- Area code: 540
- GNIS ID: 1485199
- FIPS code: 51-49700

Marshalltown is an unincorporated community in east-central Craig County, Virginia, United States. It lies along State Route 615, 4.25 miles (6.84 km) northeast of New Castle.
