= Oriskany, Virginia =

Unincorporated community in Virginia, United States

Oriskany
- Unincorporated community
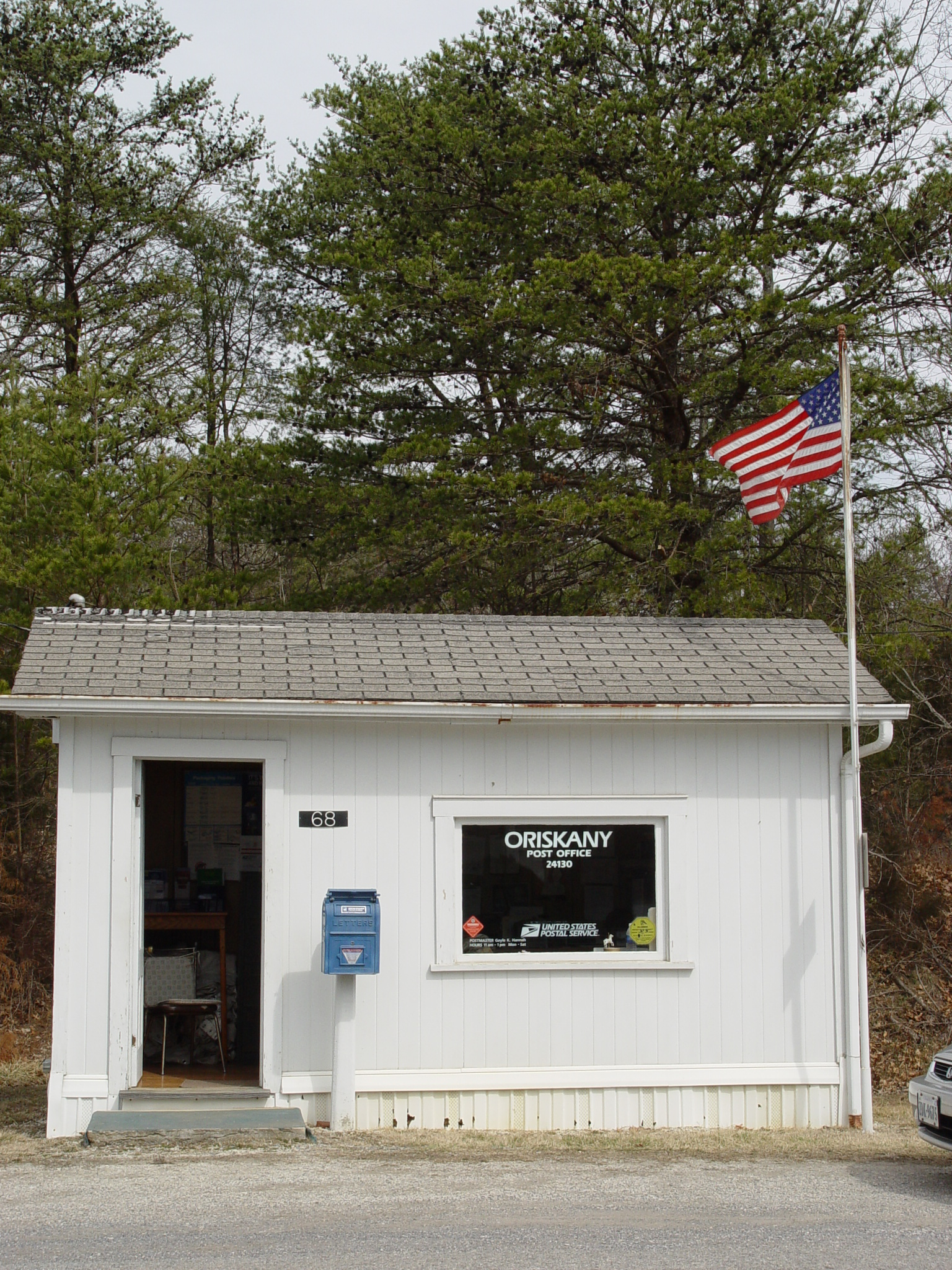
- Oriskany Post Office

- Location within the Commonwealth of Virginia Oriskany (the United States)
- Coordinates: 37°36′59″N 79°59′01″W
- Country: United States
- State: Virginia
- County: Botetourt
- Time zone: UTC−5 (Eastern (EST))
  - Summer (DST): UTC−4 (EDT)
- ZIP code: 24130

Oriskany is an unincorporated community in Botetourt County, Virginia, United States.

The community features a small post office, a church and what is known as "Oriskany Square," which is one square block that encompasses the center of the village. King Memorial Community Church is the architectural and social center of the community. The non-denominational church, built in 1904, exhibits simple American Victorian architecture, and its current pastor is David Cox.

Oriskany is located in a valley of the Blue Ridge Mountains, and nearby is canoe access to Craig Creek.

Notable Individuals from Oriskany, VA:

Mont R. Reid, MD - Surgeon that trained under Halstead in the early 1900s and went on to found and build the program at the University of Cincinnati.
