= Lord Botetourt High School =

Public high school in Virginia, US

Coordinates: 37°24′19.9″N 79°54′51.9″W

Location
- 1435 Roanoke Road; Daleville, Virginia 24083; United States

Information
- School type: Public, high school
- Established: 1959
- School district: Botetourt County Public Schools
- Superintendent: Jonathan Russ
- Principal: Andy Dewease
- Staff: 15.62
- Grades: 9-12
- Enrollment: 980 (2022–23)
- Student to teacher ratio: 62.75 (on an FTE basis)
- Language: English
- Colors: Scarlet and gray
- Athletics conference: Blue Ridge District; Region III
- Nickname: Cavaliers
- Rivals: James River High School; Northside High School; William Byrd High School
- Website: website

Lord Botetourt High School (LBHS) is a high school in Daleville, Virginia. It was built in 1958 and opened in the fall of 1959. LBHS is one of two high schools in Botetourt County, the other being James River High School in Buchanan.

The school is named for Norborne Berkeley, 4th Baron Botetourt, the governor of Virginia from 1768 to 1770. Athletic teams are known as the Cavaliers, and the school colors are scarlet and silver. As of 2023, LBHS had 63 faculty members serving 980 students in grades 9 through 12.

== Notable alumni ==
- Zach Horton, professional football tight end for the Detroit Lions
- Zack Kelly, baseball player
