= Botetourt County Public Schools =

School district in Virginia, USA

Location
- 143 Poor Farm Road, Fincastle, Virginia United States

District information
- Grades: K-12
- Superintendent: Dr. Johnathan Russ
- Deputy superintendent(s): Dr. Janet Womack
- Schools: 12
- Budget: $79,908,240 (FY2025)

Students and staff
- Students: 4,377

Other information
- Website: www.bcps.k12.va.us

Botetourt County Public Schools is the school district serving Botetourt County, Virginia.

== School board ==
Botetourt County Public Schools is governed by a five-member school board. The board is a composed of representatives from each of the county's five magisterial districts. Board members are elected to four-year terms.

== Schools ==
The Botetourt County public school system is composed of seven elementary schools, two middle schools, two high schools, and a vocational technical school. As of 2023, all of Botetourt County’s public schools were fully accredited.

=== Elementary schools ===
Name	Grades	Address	Website
Breckenridge Elementary School	K-5	331 Springwood Road, Fincastle VA 24090	link
Buchanan Elementary School	K-5	255 Schoolhouse Road, Buchanan VA 24066	link
Cloverdale Elementary School	K-5	833 Cougar Drive, Cloverdale VA 24077	link
Colonial Elementary School	K-5	142 Murray Drive, Troutville VA 24175	link
Eagle Rock Elementary School	K-5	145 Eagles Nest Drive, Eagle Rock VA 24085	link
Greenfield Elementary School	K-5	288 Etzler Road, Troutville, VA 24175	link
Troutville Elementary School	K-5	12 Barron Drive, Troutville VA 24175	link

=== Middle schools ===
Name	Grades	Address	Website
Central Academy Middle School	6-8	367 Poor Farm Road, Fincastle VA 24090	link
Read Mountain Middle School	6-8	182 Orchard Hill Drive, Cloverdale VA 24077	link

=== High schools ===
Name	Grades	Address	Website
James River High School	9-12	9906 Springwood Road, Buchanan VA 24066	link
Lord Botetourt High School	9-12	1435 Roanoke Road, Daleville VA 24083	link

=== Vocational schools ===
Name	Grades	Address	Website
Botetourt Technical Education Center	9-12	253 Poor Farm Road, Fincastle, VA 24090	link

== Feeder school patterns ==
=== Middle schools ===
- Students attending Breckenridge Elementary School, Buchanan Elementary School, or Eagle Rock Elementary School will feed into Central Academy Middle School.
- Students attending Cloverdale Elementary School, Colonial Elementary School, or Troutville Elementary School will feed into Read Mountain Middle School.
- Most students attending Greenfield Elementary School will feed into Read Mountain Middle School. Some Greenfield students that reside southwest of Fincastle will feed into Central Academy Middle School.

=== High schools ===
- Most students attending Central Academy Middle School will feed into James River High School. Some Central Academy students that reside southwest of Fincastle will feed into Lord Botetourt High School.
- Students attending Read Mountain Middle School will feed into Lord Botetourt High School.

== Awards ==
- Colonial Elementary School was named a 2018 National Blue Ribbon School by the U.S. Department of Education
- Central Academy Middle School was named a 2024 National Blue Ribbon School by the U.S. Department of Education.
