= Botetourt County, Virginia =

County in Virginia, United States

- County
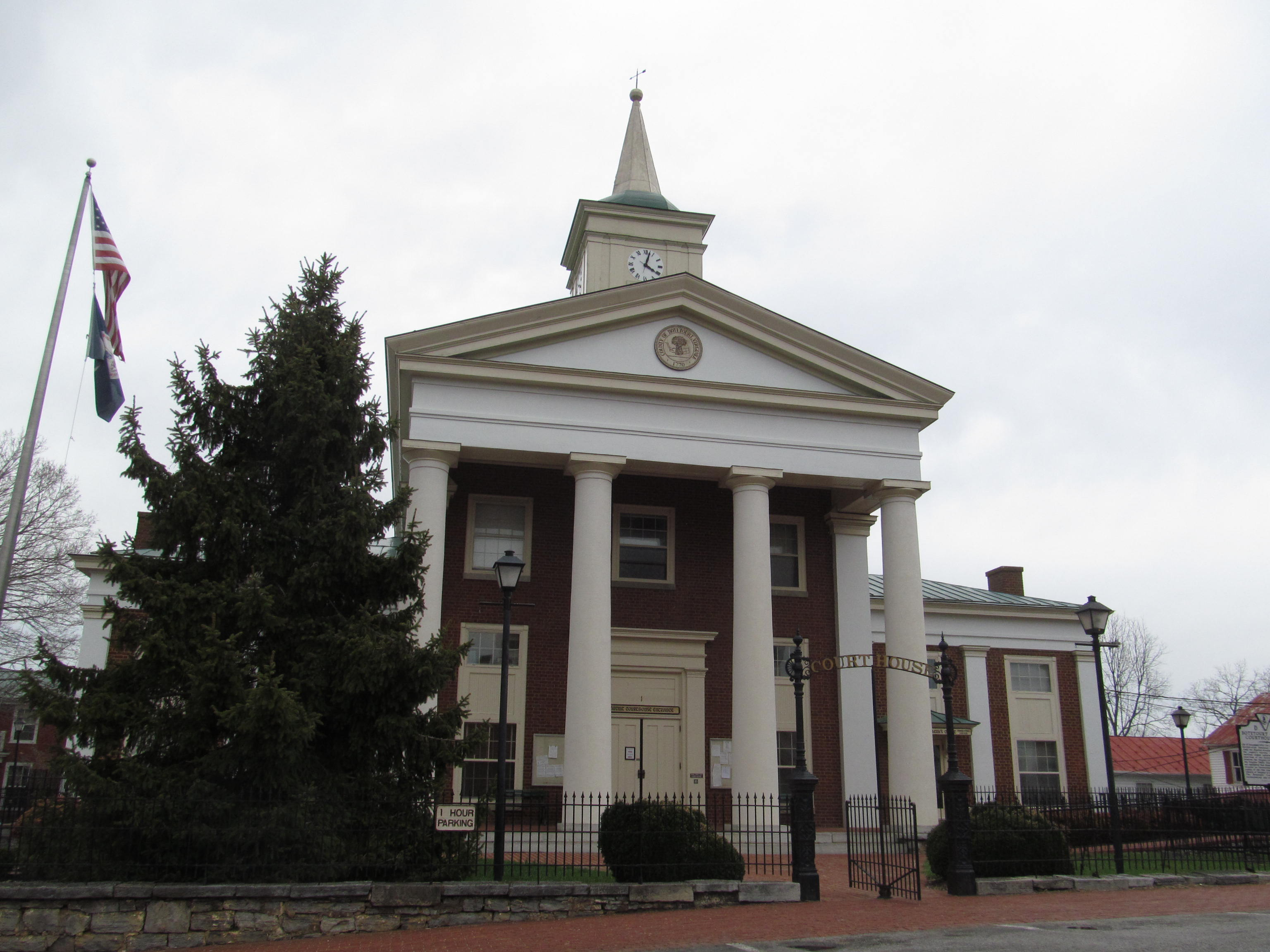
- Botetourt County Courthouse

- Flag Seal Logo

- Location within the U.S. state of Virginia
- Coordinates: 37°33′N 79°48′W
- Country: United States
- State: Virginia
- Founded: 1770
- Named for: Lord Botetourt
- Seat: Fincastle
- Largest community: Cloverdale

Area
  - Total: 546 sq mi (1,410 km^{2})
  - Land: 541 sq mi (1,400 km^{2})
  - Water: 4.7 sq mi (12 km^{2}) 0.9%

Population (2020)
  - Total: 33,596
  - Estimate (2025): 34,144 ▲
  - Density: 62.1/sq mi (24.0/km^{2})
- Time zone: UTC−5 (Eastern)
  - Summer (DST): UTC−4 (EDT)
- Congressional district: 6th
- Website: botetourtva.gov

Botetourt County (/ˈbɒtətɒt/ BOT-ə-tot) is a US county that lies in the Roanoke Region of Virginia. Located in the mountainous portion of the state, the county is bordered the Blue Ridge Mountains within the Appalachian Mountains.

Botetourt County was created in 1770 from part of Augusta County and was named for Norborne Berkeley, 4th Baron Botetourt. It originally comprised a vast area, which included the southern portion of present-day West Virginia and all of Kentucky. Portions were set off to form new counties beginning in 1772, until the current borders were established in 1851.

Botetourt County is part of the Roanoke Metropolitan Statistical Area, and the county seat is the town of Fincastle. As of the 2020 census, the county population was 33,596.

== History ==
Botetourt County, Virginia, from 1895 state map

First proposed in the House of Burgesses in 1767, Botetourt County was created in 1770 from Augusta County. The county is named for Norborne Berkeley, 4th Baron Botetourt, who served as governor of the colony of Virginia from 1768 to 1770, when he died suddenly while in office.

In 1772, the county was reduced to the area east of the New and Kanawha rivers by the creation of Fincastle County. Most of that latter county became the Commonwealth of Kentucky in 1792. The other counties established directly from portions of Botetourt County are: Rockbridge (1778), Bath (1791), Alleghany (1822), Roanoke (1833), and Craig (1851).

== Geography ==
According to the U.S. Census Bureau, the county has a total area of 546 square miles (1,410 km^{2}), of which 541 square miles (1,400 km^{2}) is land and 4.7 square miles (12 km^{2}) (0.9%) is water. The Blue Ridge Mountains run along the eastern part of the county, while the Ridge-and-Valley Appalachians run along the western portion. The two mountain ranges come close together, separated by the town of Buchanan and the James River.

The James River originates in Botetourt County, near the village of Iron Gate, just south of the Alleghany County line and near the merger of the Cowpasture River and the Jackson River. The James River runs south until Eagle Rock, where it turns east and meanders through the county, passing Springwood and James River High School until entering Buchanan. In Buchanan, the river turns northward and flows into Rockbridge County towards Glasgow.

Botetourt County is a part of the Roanoke Metropolitan Statistical Area, and the southern parts of the county have become increasingly suburban in recent decades. Much of the area's former farmland and orchards have been developed into residential subdivisions and businesses.

=== Adjacent counties ===
- Roanoke County – southwest
- Craig County – west
- Alleghany County – northwest
- Rockbridge County – northeast
- Bedford County – southeast

=== National protected areas ===
- Blue Ridge Parkway (part)
- George Washington National Forest (part)
- Jefferson National Forest (part)

=== Major highways ===
- I-81
- US 11
- US 220
- US 221
- US 460
- SR 43
- Blue Ridge Parkway

== Demographics ==
Historical population
Census	Pop.	Note	%±
1790	10,524		—
1800	10,427		−0.9%
1810	13,301		27.6%
1820	13,589		2.2%
1830	16,354		20.3%
1840	11,679		−28.6%
1850	14,908		27.6%
1860	11,516		−22.8%
1870	11,329		−1.6%
1880	14,809		30.7%
1890	14,854		0.3%
1900	17,161		15.5%
1910	17,727		3.3%
1920	16,557		−6.6%
1930	15,457		−6.6%
1940	16,447		6.4%
1950	15,766		−4.1%
1960	16,715		6.0%
1970	18,193		8.8%
1980	23,270		27.9%
1990	24,992		7.4%
2000	30,496		22.0%
2010	33,148		8.7%
2020	33,596		1.4%
2025 (est.)	34,144	▲	1.6%
U.S. Decennial Census; 1790-1960 1900-1990; 1990-2000 2010 2020

=== Racial and ethnic composition ===
Botetourt County, Virginia – Racial and ethnic composition Note: the US Census treats Hispanic/Latino as an ethnic category. This table excludes Latinos from the racial categories and assigns them to a separate category. Hispanics/Latinos may be of any race.
Race / Ethnicity (NH = Non-Hispanic)	Pop 1980	Pop 1990	Pop 2000	Pop 2010	Pop 2020	% 1980	% 1990	% 2000	% 2010	% 2020
White alone (NH)	21,978	23,647	28,833	31,212	30,506	94.45%	94.62%	94.55%	94.16%	90.80%
Black or African American alone (NH)	1,124	1,114	1,067	987	905	4.83%	4.46%	3.50%	2.98%	2.69%
Native American or Alaska Native alone (NH)	13	15	65	76	43	0.06%	0.06%	0.21%	0.23%	0.13%
Asian alone (NH)	21	71	144	174	234	0.09%	0.28%	0.47%	0.52%	0.70%
Native Hawaiian or Pacific Islander alone (NH)	x	x	1	2	3	x	x	0.00%	0.01%	0.01%
Other race alone (NH)	6	2	24	9	102	0.03%	0.01%	0.08%	0.03%	0.30%
Mixed race or Multiracial (NH)	x	x	181	332	1,027	x	x	0.59%	1.00%	3.06%
Hispanic or Latino (any race)	128	143	181	356	776	0.55%	0.57%	0.59%	1.07%	2.31%
Total	23,270	24,992	30,496	33,148	33,596	100.00%	100.00%	100.00%	100.00%	100.00%

=== 2020 census ===
As of the 2020 census, the county had a population of 33,596. The median age was 48.0 years. 19.9% of residents were under the age of 18 and 23.5% of residents were 65 years of age or older. For every 100 females there were 97.7 males, and for every 100 females age 18 and over there were 96.3 males age 18 and over.

The racial makeup of the county was 91.3% White, 2.7% Black or African American, 0.2% American Indian and Alaska Native, 0.7% Asian, 0.0% Native Hawaiian and Pacific Islander, 1.0% from some other race, and 4.0% from two or more races. Hispanic or Latino residents of any race comprised 2.3% of the population.

40.6% of residents lived in urban areas, while 59.4% lived in rural areas.

There were 13,498 households in the county, of which 27.3% had children under the age of 18 living with them and 20.2% had a female householder with no spouse or partner present. About 22.9% of all households were made up of individuals and 12.2% had someone living alone who was 65 years of age or older.

There were 14,888 housing units, of which 9.3% were vacant. Among occupied housing units, 84.8% were owner-occupied and 15.2% were renter-occupied. The homeowner vacancy rate was 1.4% and the rental vacancy rate was 5.7%.

=== 2000 Census ===
As of the census of 2000, there were 30,496 people, 11,700 households, and 9,114 families residing in the county. The population density was 56 people per square mile (22 people/km^{2}). There were 12,571 housing units at an average density of 23 units per square mile (8.9 units/km^{2}). The racial makeup of the county was 94.91% White, 3.52% Black or African American, 0.22% Native American, 0.47% Asian, 0.19% from other races, and 0.69% from two or more races. 0.59% of the population were Hispanic or Latino of any race.

There were 11,700 households, out of which 32.40% had children under the age of 18 living with them, 67.80% were married couples living together, 7.00% had a female householder with no husband present, and 22.10% were non-families. 19.20% of all households were made up of individuals, and 7.60% had someone living alone who was 65 years of age or older. The average household size was 2.56 and the average family size was 2.92.

In the county, the population was spread out, with 23.40% under the age of 18, 5.80% from 18 to 24, 28.90% from 25 to 44, 28.80% from 45 to 64, and 13.20% who were 65 years of age or older. The median age was 41 years. For every 100 females there were 99.70 males. For every 100 females aged 18 and over, there were 98.40 males.

The median income for a household in the county was $48,731, and the median income for a family was $55,125. Males had a median income of $37,182 versus $25,537 for females. The per capita income for the county was $22,218. About 3.60% of families and 5.20% of the population were below the poverty line, including 5.40% of those under age 18 and 6.50% of those age 65 or over.

== Government ==
=== Board of Supervisors ===
- Amsterdam District: Steve P. Clinton (Chairman) (R)
- Blue Ridge District: Walter Michael (R)
- Buchanan District: Amy S. White (Vice chairman) (R)
- Fincastle District: Dr. Richard G. "Dick" Bailey (R)
- Valley District: Dr. Donald M. "Mac" Scothorn (R)

=== Constitutional officers ===
- Clerk of the Circuit Court: Tommy L. Moore (I)
- Commissioner of the Revenue: Chris T. Booth (R)
- Commonwealth's Attorney: John R. H. Alexander II (R)
- Sheriff: Matthew T. Ward (R)
- Treasurer: Donna Boothe (R)

Botetourt County is represented by Republican Chris Head in the Virginia Senate, Republican Terry L. Austin in the Virginia House of Delegates, and Republican Ben Cline in the U.S. House of Representatives.

== Education ==
Botetourt County Public Schools operates public schools serving the county, with students attending one of two high schools:

- Lord Botetourt High School opened in Daleville in the fall of 1959 and serves the southern parts of the county, including the communities of Blue Ridge, Cloverdale, parts of Fincastle and Troutville, and the northernmost suburbs of Roanoke.
- James River High School in the Springwood area of Buchanan also opened in 1959. It serves the northern parts of the county including Buchanan, Eagle Rock, Springwood, and parts of Fincastle and Troutville.

== Politics ==
The Republican candidate for president has won the support of Botetourt County in seventeen of the last nineteen races. The county also voted Republican for governor in 2005, 2009, 2013, 2017, 2021, and 2025. It voted in 2008 for Mark Warner in the U.S. Senate election.

United States presidential election results for Botetourt County, Virginia
Year	Republican		Democratic		Third party(ies)	
Year	No.	%	No.	%	No.	%
1912	517	32.15%	889	55.29%	202	12.56%
1916	775	45.83%	900	53.22%	16	0.95%
1920	1,240	48.17%	1,331	51.71%	3	0.12%
1924	1,264	45.90%	1,427	51.82%	63	2.29%
1928	1,575	56.76%	1,200	43.24%	0	0.00%
1932	1,209	39.54%	1,808	59.12%	41	1.34%
1936	1,343	46.29%	1,544	53.22%	14	0.48%
1940	1,085	44.80%	1,329	54.87%	8	0.33%
1944	1,272	49.65%	1,275	49.77%	15	0.59%
1948	1,363	51.81%	1,026	39.00%	242	9.20%
1952	2,021	61.50%	1,264	38.47%	1	0.03%
1956	2,280	60.67%	1,377	36.64%	101	2.69%
1960	2,159	56.79%	1,621	42.64%	22	0.58%
1964	2,098	46.87%	2,377	53.11%	1	0.02%
1968	2,598	50.54%	1,272	24.75%	1,270	24.71%
1972	3,806	69.44%	1,519	27.71%	156	2.85%
1976	3,343	44.14%	4,021	53.10%	209	2.76%
1980	4,408	51.24%	3,698	42.99%	496	5.77%
1984	5,959	64.15%	3,243	34.91%	87	0.94%
1988	5,687	59.30%	3,763	39.23%	141	1.47%
1992	5,904	48.36%	4,349	35.62%	1,956	16.02%
1996	6,404	51.73%	4,576	36.96%	1,400	11.31%
2000	8,867	64.07%	4,627	33.43%	346	2.50%
2004	10,865	68.78%	4,801	30.39%	131	0.83%
2008	11,471	65.90%	5,693	32.71%	242	1.39%
2012	12,479	68.41%	5,452	29.89%	310	1.70%
2016	13,375	71.38%	4,494	23.98%	870	4.64%
2020	15,099	71.49%	5,700	26.99%	321	1.52%
2024	15,796	71.87%	5,915	26.91%	267	1.21%

== Fire, Emergency medical services, and Law enforcement ==
Botetourt County Fire & EMS uses a combination of career staff and volunteers to provide fire protection, emergency medical services, fire safety education, swiftwater rescue, and other emergency services to the county. The department operates out of seven stations with a range of fire apparatus and ambulances to provide these services.

Botetourt County Sheriff's Office is the policing body within Botetourt County. They are stationed in Fincastle, Virginia along with the county jail. The Sheriff is Matthew T. Ward, who was elected in November 2019. Botetourt County Sheriff's Office works closely with Virginia State Police, as the county only has 69 officers within their force. The county also has their own Emergency Communications Center, which serves to take 9-1-1 calls and help direct law enforcement and first responders to emergency scenes.

== Communities ==
=== Towns ===
- Buchanan
- Fincastle
- Troutville

=== Census-designated places ===
- Blue Ridge
- Cloverdale
- Daleville
- Eagle Rock
- Glen Wilton
- Hollins
- Laymantown

=== Unincorporated communities ===
- Arcadia
- Haden
- Lithia
- Nace
- Oriskany
- Springwood

== Notable people ==
- George A. Anderson (1853–1896), United States Congressman from Illinois
- Samuel Barton (1749–1810), Explorer, pioneer, early settler of Nashville and patriot
- George Louis Alfonso Pogue (1887–1956), African American doctor who opened an integrated pharmacy in the 1920s in Bedford
- Edward Rumsey (1796–1868), United States Representative from Kentucky
- Angela Tincher, Virginia Tech softball pitcher from 2005 to 2008
- Matthew Ramsey, Songwriter and lead vocalist of the band Old Dominion

== See also ==
- National Register of Historic Places listings in Botetourt County, Virginia
