= Coiner House =

Historic house in Virginia, United States

- U.S. National Register of Historic Places
- Virginia Landmarks Register
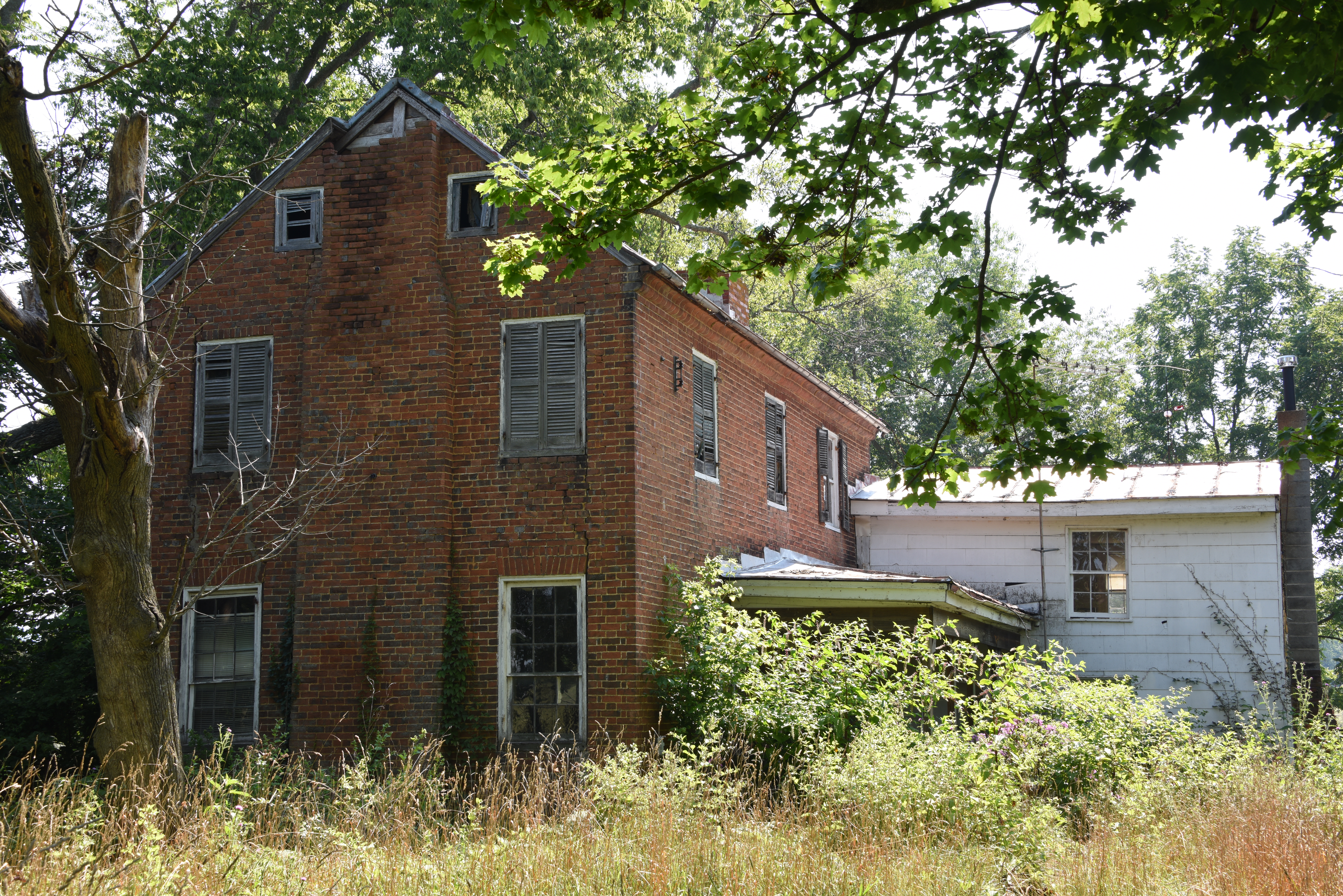

- Location within Virginia Location within the United States
- Location: Northwest of Crimora off VA 865, near Crimora, Virginia
- Coordinates: 38°10′2″N 78°51′48″W
- Area: 35 acres (14 ha)
- Built: 1825
- NRHP reference No.: 78003005
- VLR No.: 007-0224

Significant dates
- Added to NRHP: March 30, 1978
- Designated VLR: June 21, 1977

Coiner House, also known as Koyner House and Koiner House, is a historic home located near Crimora, Augusta County, Virginia, built in the 1820s or early 1830s. It is a two-story, brick structure built to the "I-house" plan, with an original one-story kitchen wing. The interior features colorful graining, marbleizing, and polychromy, as well as elaborate provincial woodwork. In recent years, the property has been vacant and the Coiner House left unmaintained.

It was listed on the National Register of Historic Places in 1978.

== History and description ==
The house was built on 293 acres (119 ha) of land owned by John Coiner as of 1827. The house's architecture and surviving records support construction of the house in the 1820s or early 1830s. In 1827 his property was assessed with buildings worth 700 dollars; two years later the assessment had increased to 1,000 dollars. It remained in the family until it was sold in 1976. Also on the property are an associated late-19th century bank barn and mid-19th century dairy.

The building is a two-story, three-bay brick "I-house", with an original one-story kitchen wing. "It built of brick laid in Flemish bond on the front and in three- and four-course American bond on the sides, the rear, and the original east kitchen wing. The mortar joints are penciled. The house is set on a limestone underpinning and has a molded brick cornice as well as a stepped water table on the front. A semi-exterior end chimney is at the west end, and the one-story kitchen wing is at the east. Attached to the kitchen wing is an early twentieth-century, two-story frame ell. A one-story porch of the same period as the frame ell extends from the front door of the old house to the ell. The front doorway has a parieled reveal and a three-light transom, and the door head is decorated with alternating gouged ten-point stars, and clusters of five flutes. The windows which have nine-over-six sash on the first floor and six-over-six sash on the second."
