= Verona School =

Historic school building in Virginia, United States

- U.S. National Register of Historic Places
- Virginia Landmarks Register
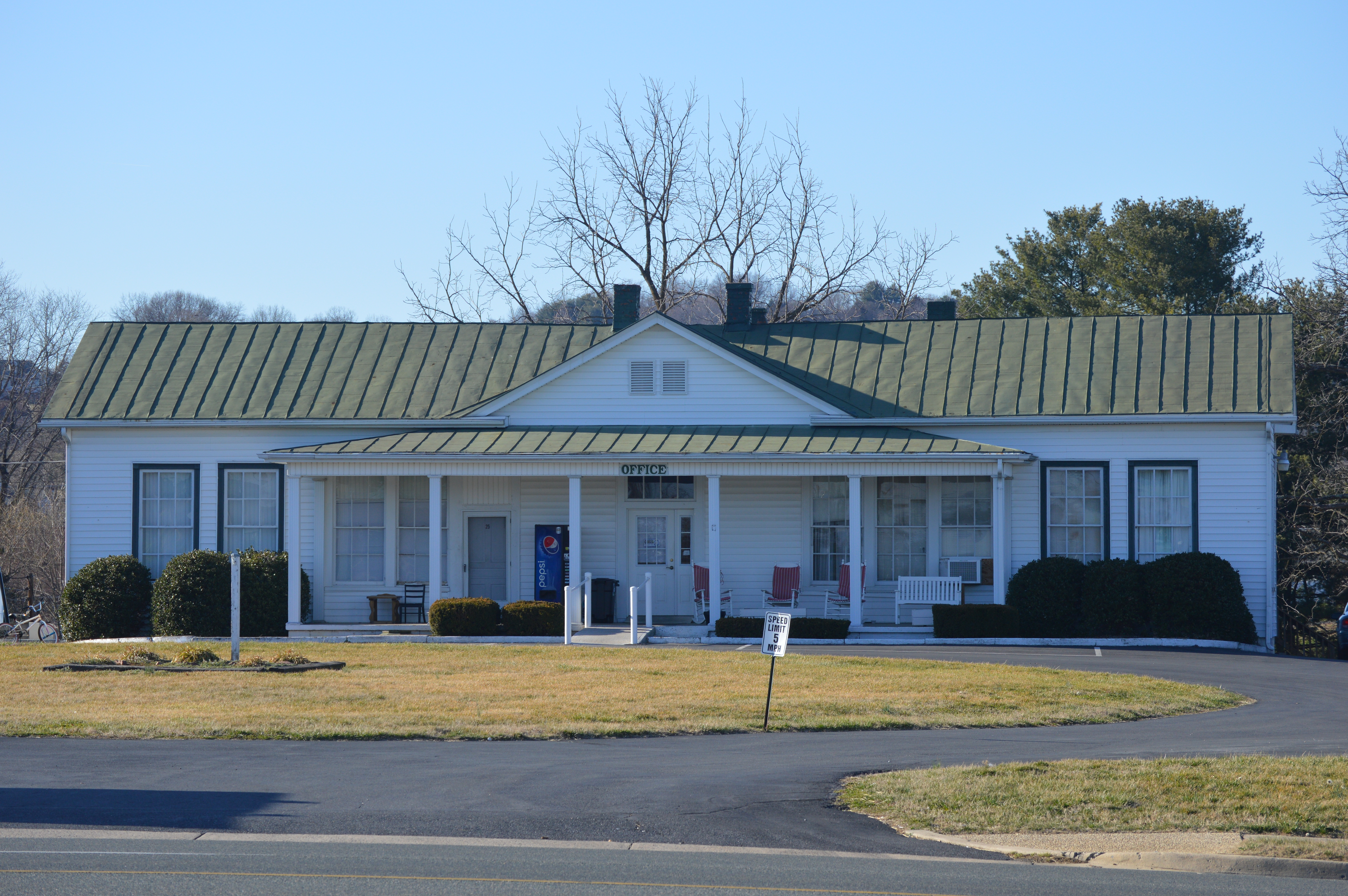
- Front of the school

- Location within Virginia Location within the United States
- Location: U.S. Route 11, Verona, Virginia
- Coordinates: 38°12′13″N 79°0′27″W
- Area: 0.5 acres (0.20 ha)
- Built: 1911
- MPS: Public Schools in Augusta County Virginia 1870-1940 TR
- NRHP reference No.: 85000395
- VLR No.: 007-1299

Significant dates
- Added to NRHP: February 27, 1985
- Designated VLR: December 11, 1984

Verona School is a historic public school building located at Verona, Augusta County, Virginia. It was built in 1911, as a three-room, frame schoolhouse in the manner of a common I-house design. The school closed by the late 1940s, and around 1956–1957, was moved back from the road and converted to an office and manager's residence for a neighboring motel.

It was listed on the National Register of Historic Places in 1985.
