= Crimora School =

Historic school building in Virginia, US

- U.S. National Register of Historic Places
- Virginia Landmarks Register
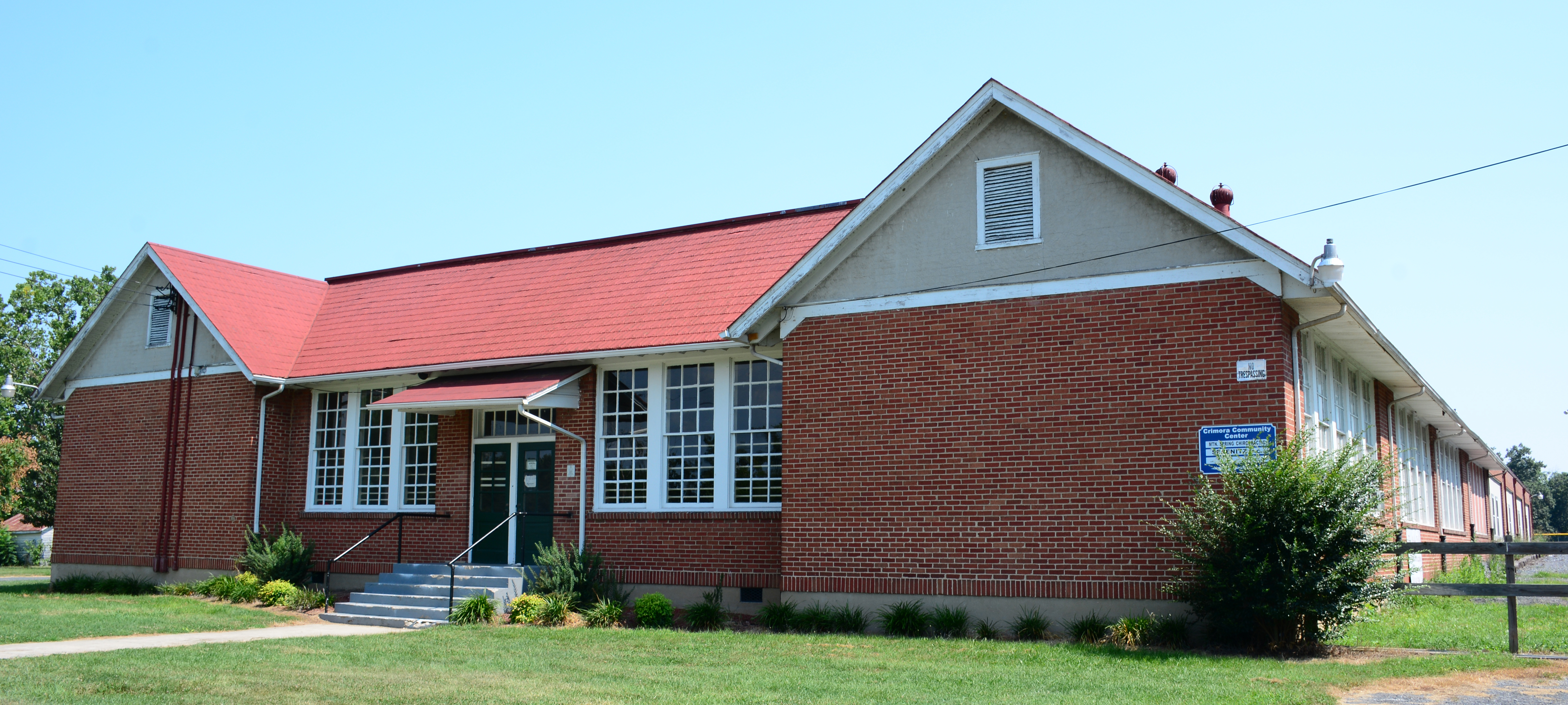

- Location within Virginia Location within the United States
- Location: VA 612, Crimora, Virginia
- Coordinates: 38°9′18″N 78°51′09″W
- Area: 5 acres (2.0 ha)
- Built: 1927, 1930s, 1942, 1954-55
- Built by: State Dept. of Education; et al.
- Architectural style: Bungalow/craftsman, Vernacular Bungalow
- MPS: Public Schools in Augusta County Virginia 1870--1940 TR
- NRHP reference No.: 85000384
- VLR No.: 007-0964

Significant dates
- Added to NRHP: February 27, 1985
- Designated VLR: December 11, 1984

Crimora School, also known as Crimora Grammar School, is a historic public school building located at Crimora, Augusta County, Virginia. The original section was built in 1927, and is a single-story brick building consisting of an auditorium/gymnasium as the core of the building flanked by classrooms. It was expanded multiple times over the next few decades to accommodate the growing population. The building now serves as a community center.

It was listed on the National Register of Historic Places in 1985.

== History and description ==
The center of the building is its auditorium/gymnasium with rectangular gabled blocks on either side containing two classrooms with the projecting gable ends in a Vernacular Bungalow style. This plan proved the most popular of the plans developed by the Division of School Building in the 1920s in Augusta County. The school was twice expanded in the 1930s, adding four more classrooms, and again in 1942. This last addition "added one more classroom on each side with a lunchroom behind the auditorium and a finished basement with a steam boiler to replace the six wood stoves previously used. In 1954–1955, the school was again enlarged with a large brick veneer rear addition containing six classrooms, a cafeteria, teacher's lounge, library and office. It only ever had elementary-grade students."

"The Crimora School is the best-preserved example of the central-auditorium school plan in the county. Like the other examples of this plan built in the late 1920s and early 1930s, the school is of brick construction on a concrete foundation. Pressed tin covers the central hipped bungalow roof portion as well as most of the gable roof wings. Whereas later examples of this plan, like the North River School, display the Colonial styles, the Crimora School hints at the bungalow style. A pent roof porch shelters the transom-lighted front door with sets of three 9-over-9 sash windows to each side. The front gable on each side were originally wood-shingled, but they are now covered with stucco and pierced by a square window. On the side walls, each classroom is lighted by a group of five 9-over-9 sash windows."
