= Roy Sullivan =

Man struck by lightning 7 times (1912–1983)

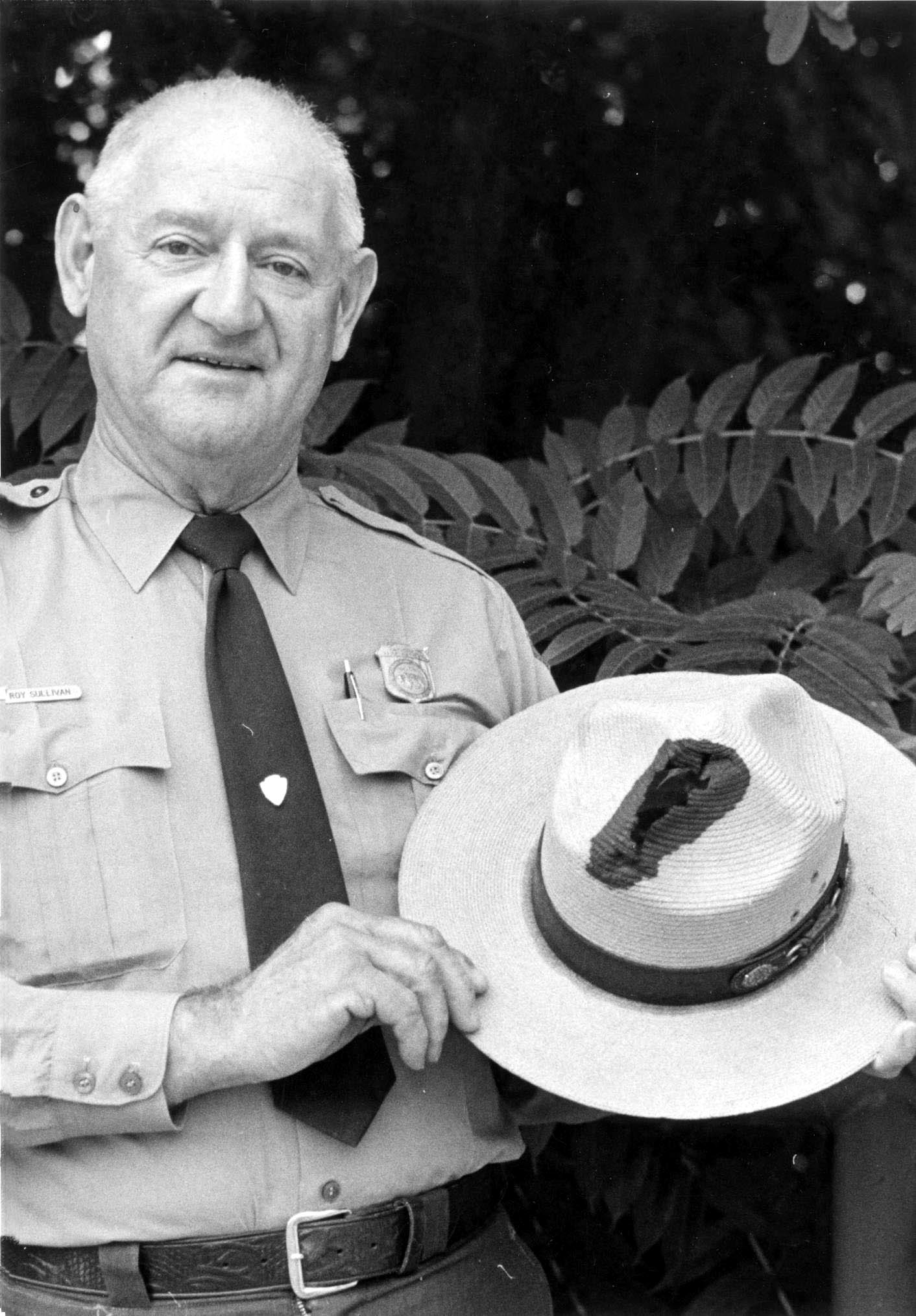
- Sullivan. A prominent burn mark is visible on his ranger hat.
- Born: Roy Cleveland Sullivan; February 7, 1912; Greene County, Virginia, U.S.
- Died: September 28, 1983 (aged 71); Dooms, Virginia, U.S.
- Known for: Getting struck by lightning seven times

Roy Cleveland Sullivan (February 7, 1912 – September 28, 1983) was an American park ranger in Shenandoah National Park in Virginia. Between 1942 and 1977, Sullivan was claimed to have survived being struck by lightning seven times, gaining the nicknames "Human Lightning Conductor" and "Human Lightning Rod". Sullivan is recognized by Guinness World Records as the person struck by lightning more recorded times than any other human.

== Personal life ==
Sullivan was born in Greene County, Virginia, on February 7, 1912. He started working as a ranger in Shenandoah National Park in 1936. Sullivan was described as a brawny man with a broad, rugged face, who resembled the actor Gene Hackman. He was said to have been avoided by people during the later years of his life, owing to fears of being struck by lightning, and that saddened him. He once recalled: "For instance, I was walking with the Chief Ranger one day when lightning struck way off” (in the distance). The Chief said, "I'll see you later".

On the morning of September 28, 1983, Sullivan died at the age of 71 from a self-inflicted gunshot wound to the head. Two of his ranger hats are on display at two Guinness World Exhibit Halls in New York City and South Carolina.

== Seven strikes ==
Sullivan described in detail each of the alleged strike encounters.

1. Sullivan's first documented lightning strike was in April 1942. He was said to have been hiding from a thunderstorm in a fire lookout tower. The tower was newly built and had no lightning rod at the time; it was said to have been struck seven to eight times. Sullivan described a scene from within the tower, saying that "fire was jumping all over the place". Sullivan was said to then have run out from the burning tower, just before being struck a few feet away by lightning. It burned a half-inch strip all along his right leg, hit his toe, and left a hole in his shoe.
2. He was hit again in July 1969. Unusually, he was hit while in his truck, driving on a mountain road – the metal body of a vehicle normally protects people from lightning strikes by acting as a Faraday cage. The lightning first hit nearby trees and was deflected into the open window of the truck. The strike knocked Sullivan unconscious, burned off his eyebrows and eyelashes, and set his hair on fire. The uncontrolled truck kept moving until it stopped near a cliff edge.
3. In July 1970, Sullivan was struck while in his front yard. The lightning hit a nearby power transformer and from there jumped to his left shoulder, searing it.
4. In the spring of 1972, Sullivan was working inside a ranger station in Shenandoah National Park when he was struck again. It set his hair on fire; he tried to smother the flames with his jacket. He then rushed to the restroom, but could not fit under the water tap and so used a wet towel instead. Although he never was a fearful man, after the fourth strike he began to believe that some force was trying to destroy him and he acquired a fear of death. For months, whenever he was caught in a storm while driving his truck, he would pull over and lie down on the front seat until the storm passed. He also began to believe that he would somehow attract lightning even if he stood in a crowd of people, and carried a can of water with him in case his hair was set on fire.
5. On August 7, 1973, while he was out on patrol in the park, Sullivan saw a storm cloud forming and drove away quickly. But the cloud, he said later, seemed to be following him. When he finally thought he had outrun it, he decided it was safe to leave his truck. Soon after, he was struck by a lightning bolt. Sullivan stated that he actually saw the bolt that hit him. The lightning moved down his left arm and left leg and knocked off his shoe. It then crossed over to his right leg just below the knee. Still conscious, Sullivan crawled to his truck and poured the can of water, which he always kept there, over his head, which was on fire.
6. The next strike, on June 5, 1976, injured his ankle. It was reported that he saw a cloud, thought that it was following him, tried to run away, but was struck anyway. His hair also caught fire.
7. On June 25, 1977, Sullivan was struck while fishing in a freshwater pool. The lightning hit the top of his head, set his hair on fire, traveled down, and burnt his chest and stomach. Sullivan turned to his car when something unexpected occurred – a bear approached the pond and tried to steal trout from his fishing line. Sullivan had the strength and courage to strike the bear with a tree branch, despite the fact that his hair was on fire. He claimed that this was the twenty-second time he hit a bear with a stick in his lifetime.

All seven strikes were documented by the superintendent of Shenandoah National Park, R. Taylor Hoskins. Hoskins, however, was never present at any of the reported strikes and was not an active and present superintendent in Shenandoah National Park for many of the times Sullivan was supposedly struck. Sullivan himself recalled that the first time he was struck by lightning was not in 1942 but much earlier. When he was a child, he was helping his father to cut wheat in a field, when a thunderbolt struck the blade of his scythe without injuring him. But because he could not prove the fact later, he never claimed it.

Sullivan's wife was also struck once, when a storm suddenly arrived as she was out hanging clothes in their back yard. Her husband was helping her at the time, but escaped unharmed. This changed their married life: he would put his wife and three children in the living room, while he sat apart in the kitchen, afraid for their wellbeing.

== In popular culture ==
- He also was on an episode of To Tell the Truth to share about his first five times getting hit by lightning.
- The 2021 short film Don vs Lightning is inspired by Sullivan's story.
- The 2016 game Firewatch mentions Sullivan getting struck by lightning and his passing.

== See also ==
- Lightning injury
- Lightning strike
