= Crimora, Virginia =

- CDP
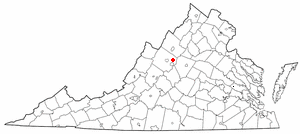
- Location of Crimora, Virginia
- Coordinates: 38°9′39″N 78°50′21″W
- Country: United States
- State: Virginia
- County: Augusta

Area
  - Total: 3.1 sq mi (8.0 km^{2})
  - Land: 3.1 sq mi (8.0 km^{2})
  - Water: 0 sq mi (0.0 km^{2})
- Elevation: 1,253 ft (382 m)

Population (2020)
  - Total: 2,219
  - Density: 720/sq mi (280/km^{2})
- Time zone: UTC−5 (Eastern (EST))
  - Summer (DST): UTC−4 (EDT)
- ZIP code: 24431
- Area code: 540
- FIPS code: 51-20240
- GNIS feature ID: 1492825

Crimora is a census-designated place (CDP) in Augusta County, Virginia, United States. As of the 2020 census, Crimora had a population of 2,219. It is part of the Staunton–Waynesboro Micropolitan Statistical Area.

== Geography ==
Crimora is located at 38°9′39″N 78°50′21″W (38.160845, −78.839088).

According to the United States Census Bureau, the CDP has a total area of 3.1 square miles (8.0 km^{2}), all land.

== History ==
What put Crimora on the map was the open-pit Crimora Manganese Mine that started in 1866. The mineral manganese was used in the production of steel. Mining at Crimora continued intermittently under a series of owners until March 1946. The Crimora deposit is about 500 feet wide, 200 feet deep, and half a mile long and consists of clay with scattered lumps of manganese ore. It lies under a layer of clay and quartz fragments about 15 feet thick. The Crimora deposit produced more manganese than any other single deposit in the United States and, at one time, the mining operations there were among the largest in the world.

The mines are located at the foothills of the mountains of the Shenandoah National Park. They are two miles east of Crimora Station on the Norfolk Southern Railway formerly known as the Shenandoah Valley Railroad. Crimora Station was located at milepost 136.9 but the station is no longer there. The remains of the mine consist of three adjoining man-made lakes that range from 20 to 100 feet deep, with underwater shafts connecting multiple water sources around the Crimora area.

The Coiner House and Crimora School are listed on the National Register of Historic Places.

== Transportation ==
Crimora is located roughly five miles north of Waynesboro on U.S. Route 340, known as Eastside Highway. It is a U.S. primary and has locally been called "The Bloody Highway" because of the above average crash statistics for Augusta County. Route 340 was widened to a five-lane, unlimited access highway in 2002 in Crimora's village center but it is only 0.6 mile in length. VDOT plans to eventually widen North 340 from Waynesboro to Grottoes.

== Points of interest ==
Turk Mountain is the prominent landmark of Crimora and has a giant boulder on the north end of its summit. The boulder is accessible by foot from the Shenandoah National Park and The Appalachian Trail; the overlook has views of Crimora and surrounding areas. Turk Mountain Lane is a collector road that has a terminus directly below the Turk Mountain overlook and is the southern limit of Crimora's CDA (Community Development Area).90% of Crimora's newest housing stock has sprung up near Turk Mountain Lane in Northwood and Vesper View Subdivisions. The final phase of Vesper View is not yet built.

Other landmarks include Davis Mountain and Wildcat Ridge seen on the northern end of Crimora's Sampson area. The Crimora Overlook is an automobile friendly pull off that lies directly on the Shenandoah National Park and can be seen above Wildcat Ridge on a summit further east. The Crimora Community Center is a historic landmark that was built as a school in 1920. Around 2005 Augusta County built a town park beside the community center on the banks of the South River.

A local landmark is the Purple Cow Drive-In, a former ice-cream stand currently unoccupied. The old Purple Cow sign—a cow head on a pole, painted in purple and white—still exists and led to the street name Purple Cow Road.

== Demographics ==
|2020= 2219

Historical population
| Census | Pop. | Note | %± |
|---|---|---|---|
| 2000 | 1,796 | | — |
| 2010 | 2,209 | | 23.0% |
| 2020 | 2,219 | | 0.5% |
U.S. Decennial Census; 2010 2020

As of the census of 2000, there were 1,796 people, 724 households, and 516 families residing in the CDP. The population density was 584.3 people per square mile (225.9/km^{2}). There were 761 housing units at an average density of 247.6/sq mi (95.7/km^{2}). The racial makeup of the CDP was 97.61% White, 0.84% African American, 0.22% Native American, 0.22% Asian, and 1.11% from two or more races. Hispanic or Latino of any race were 0.78% of the population.

There were 724 households, out of which 31.6% had children under the age of 18 living with them, 55.5% were married couples living together, 10.6% had a female householder with no husband present, and 28.7% were non-families. 24.4% of all households were made up of individuals, and 8.3% had someone living alone who was 65 years of age or older. The average household size was 2.48 and the average family size was 2.92.

In the CDP, the population was spread out, with 24.1% under the age of 18, 8.1% from 18 to 24, 30.3% from 25 to 44, 25.7% from 45 to 64, and 11.7% who were 65 years of age or older. The median age was 38 years. For every 100 females there were 95.9 males. For every 100 females age 18 and over, there were 93.6 males.

The median income for a household in the CDP was $30,430, and the median income for a family was $35,650. Males had a median income of $27,350 versus $17,476 for females. The per capita income for the CDP was $14,864. About 9.5% of families and 13.8% of the population were below the poverty line, including 19.9% of those under age 18 and 9.7% of those age 65 or over.

== Notable people ==
- Mac Wiseman – Musician inducted into the International Bluegrass Music Hall of Honor. On January 4, 1975, while on Hee Haw, he saluted his hometown of Crimora, Virginia, Population 45.
- Maven Huffman – Former professional wrestler with World Wrestling Entertainment
