= Mt. Torry Furnace =

- U.S. National Register of Historic Places
- Virginia Landmarks Register
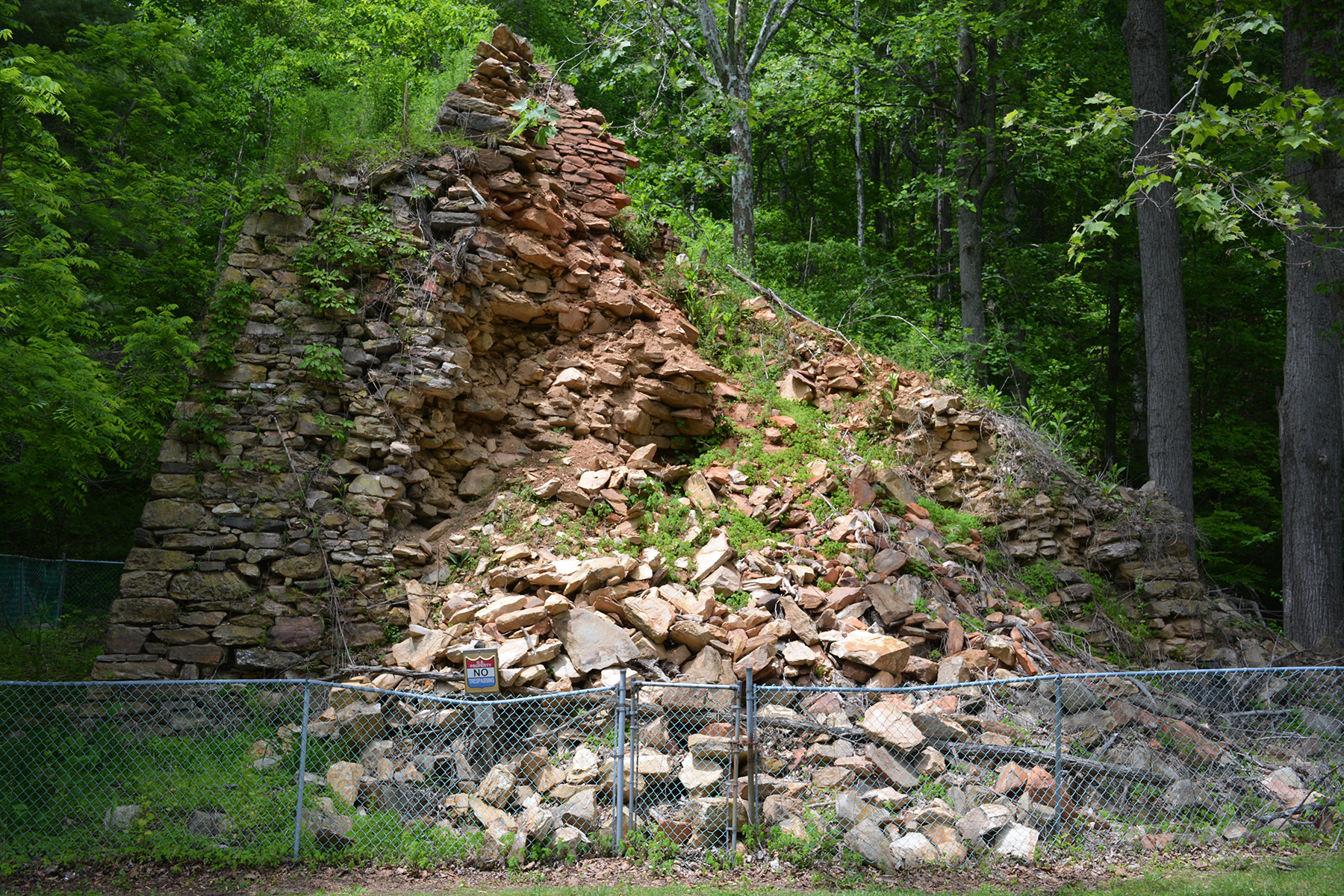

- Location within Virginia Location within the United States
- Location: Southwest of Waynesboro on VA 664 in the George Washington National Forest, Sherando, Virginia
- Coordinates: 37°56′43″N 78°57′53″W
- Area: 2 acres (0.81 ha)
- Built: 1804
- NRHP reference No.: 74002231
- VLR No.: 007-0871

Significant dates
- Added to NRHP: February 25, 1974
- Designated VLR: July 17, 1973

Mt. Torry Furnace, also known as Virginia Furnace, is a historic iron furnace located at Sherando, Augusta County, Virginia. It was built in 1804, and is a stone square trapezoid measuring 30 feet at the base and 40 feet tall. The original cold-blast charcoal stack was converted for hot blast in 1853. It shut down in 1855, then was reactivated in 1863 to support the Confederate States Army. The furnace was destroyed in June 1864 during the American Civil War by Brigadier General Alfred N. Duffié, then rebuilt in January 1865. It operated until 1884.

It was listed on the National Register of Historic Places in 1974.
