= Valley Railroad Stone Bridge =

- U.S. National Register of Historic Places
- Virginia Landmarks Register
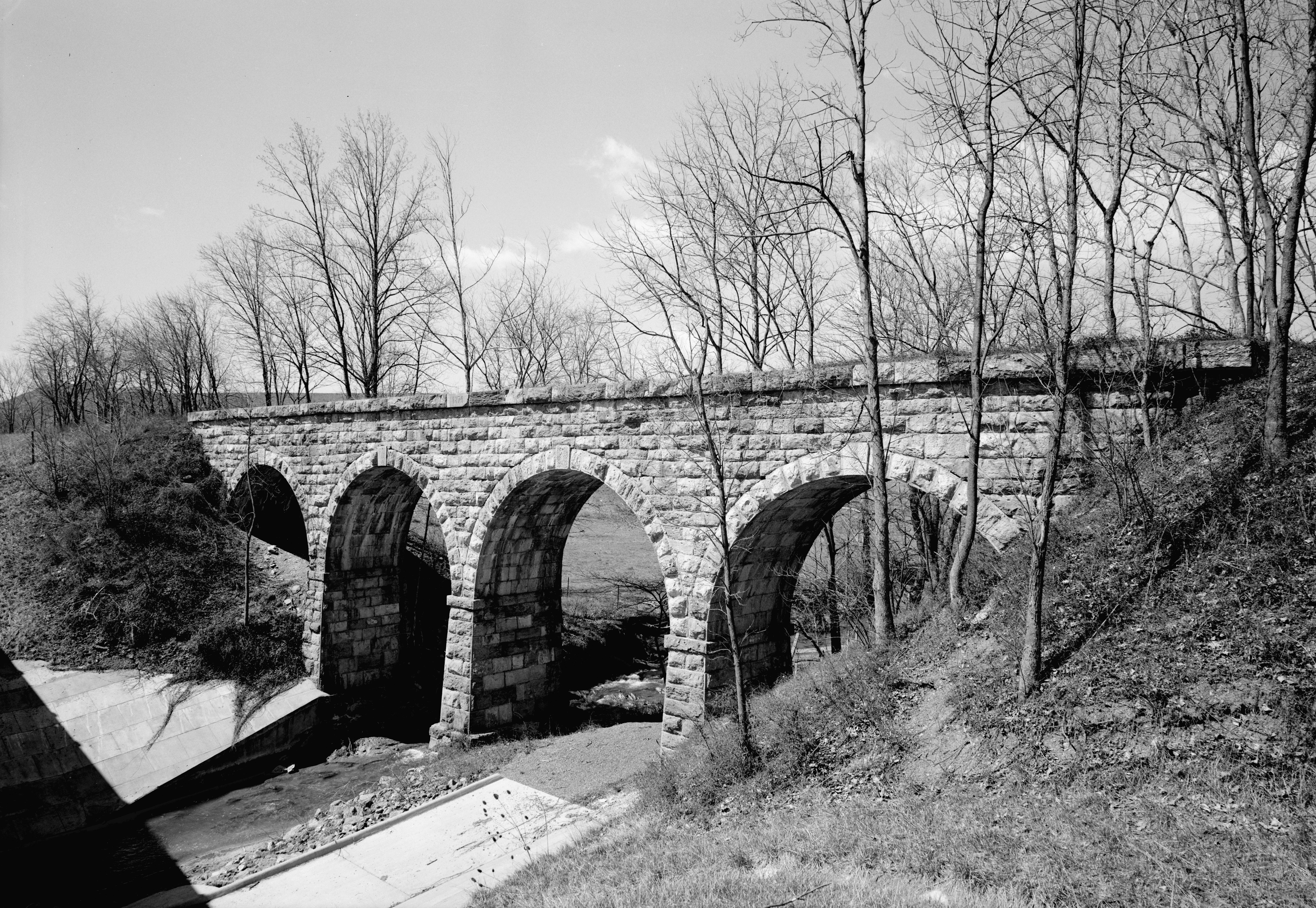
- Valley Railroad Stone Bridge, HAER Photo, April 1971

- Location within Virginia Location within the United States
- Location: South of Jolivue off VA 654, near Jolivue, Virginia
- Coordinates: 38.089452°N 79.077664°W
- Area: 1 acre (0.40 ha)
- Built: 1874
- Built by: Valley Railroad
- NRHP reference No.: 74002105
- VLR No.: 007-0041

Significant dates
- Added to NRHP: November 19, 1974
- Designated VLR: September 17, 1974

Valley Railroad Stone Bridge is a historic stone arch bridge spanning Folly Mills Creek near Jolivue, Augusta County, Virginia. It was built in 1874 by the Valley Railroad, and is a four-span structure with an overall length of 130 feet (40 m) and a width of 15 feet (4.6 m). It is constructed of granite and faced in ashlar and features semi-circular arches set on gently splayed piers. It was acquired by the Virginia Department of Transportation in 1965. It is considered a scenic landmark along Interstate 81.

It was listed on the National Register of Historic Places in 1974.

== See also ==
- List of bridges documented by the Historic American Engineering Record in Virginia
- List of bridges on the National Register of Historic Places in Virginia
- Valley Railroad Bridge
