= Harnsberger Octagonal Barn =

- U.S. National Register of Historic Places
- Virginia Landmarks Register
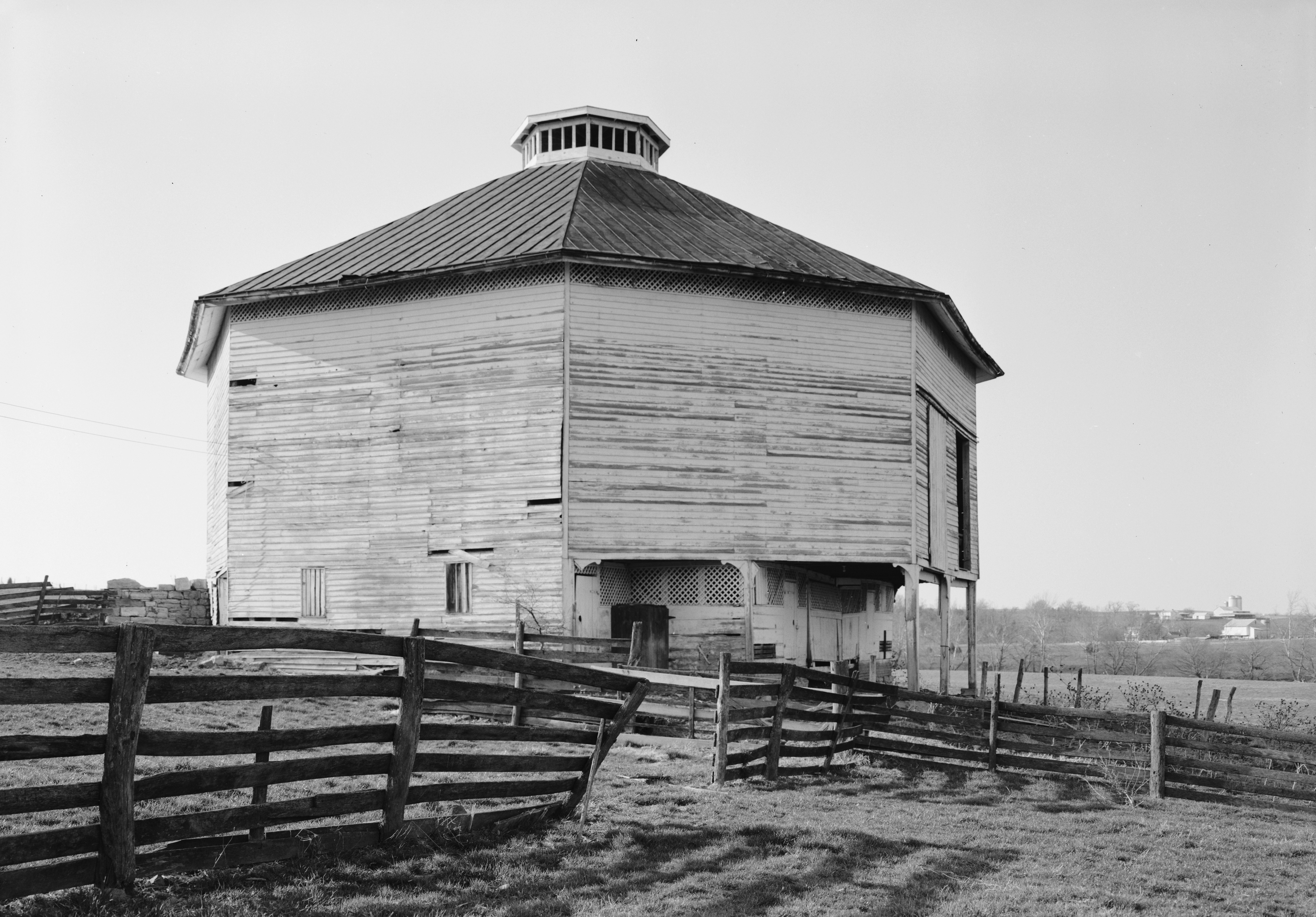

- Location within Virginia Location within the United States
- Nearest city: Grottoes, Virginia
- Coordinates: 38°15′44″N 78°51′53″W
- Area: 1.5 acres (0.61 ha)
- Built: 1867
- Built by: William Evers
- Architectural style: Octagonal barn
- NRHP reference No.: 82004541
- VLR No.: 007-0037

Significant dates
- Added to NRHP: July 8, 1982
- Designated VLR: December 16, 1980

The Harnsberger Octagonal Barn, also known the Mt. Meridian Octagonal Barn, is located near Grottoes, Virginia, built about 1867 post-American Civil War era than in economically depressed Virginia. The octagonal style was popularized in 1853 by A Home For All, or the Gravel Wall and Octagon Mode of Building by Orson Squire Fowler. "The unusual structure is possibly a unique example of its type in Virginia and reflects the penetration of popular architectural ideals in to the vernacular cultural patterns of rural Augusta County after the American Civil War|Civil of 1861–1865. The Harnsberger barn did not copy Fowler's pattern book designs directly, however. Augusta builders combined these new ideas with more traditional barn building concepts, integrating the new shape with the older bank barn form." It was restored in 1978.

The barn was placed on the National Register of Historic Places on July 8, 1982.

== History and description ==
The barn was built for Robert Samuel Harnsberger about 1867, following the example of his brother Stephen, who had built an octagonal house nearby in 1856. It remained in agricultural use through 1982 and was restored in 1978. The barn's builders encountered difficulty in assembling and fitting the barn, requiring the assistance of other carpenters.

The wood frame barn represents an adaptation of the octagonal concept to the site, incorporating elements of traditional bank barns. The barn retains the traditional bank barn functions of a central wagon floor with hay lofts to either side, rather than a functional distinction between each of the sides as suggested by Fowler. As with a bank barn, accommodations for cattle are on the lower level, with the stalls arranged in a line rather than radially. Sliding doors on the west side serve as the upper entrance, "with a central octagonal focus for turning around wagons and equipment. The main floor design did not utilize "different bays for different things" to economize space as Fowler suggested, but instead enclosed hay storage space to the north and south sides of the central wagon floor, in the usual local manner. The builders constructed the traditional forebay on the lower end of the barn, here across three sides, to provide access into the cattle stalls. The partitions and mangers on this lower level again are arranged on an east/west axis, as on the main level, rather than radiating from the center as Fowler suggested."

The major heavy structural framing members remain, although several rafters, studs, and floor boards have been replaced. When this restoration work was completed in 1978, aluminum siding and a tin roof were added. The taller, lattice-work cupola shown in a 1950s photograph has been cutoff to the present, lower octagonal shape.
