= Hanger Mill =

- U.S. National Register of Historic Places
- Virginia Landmarks Register
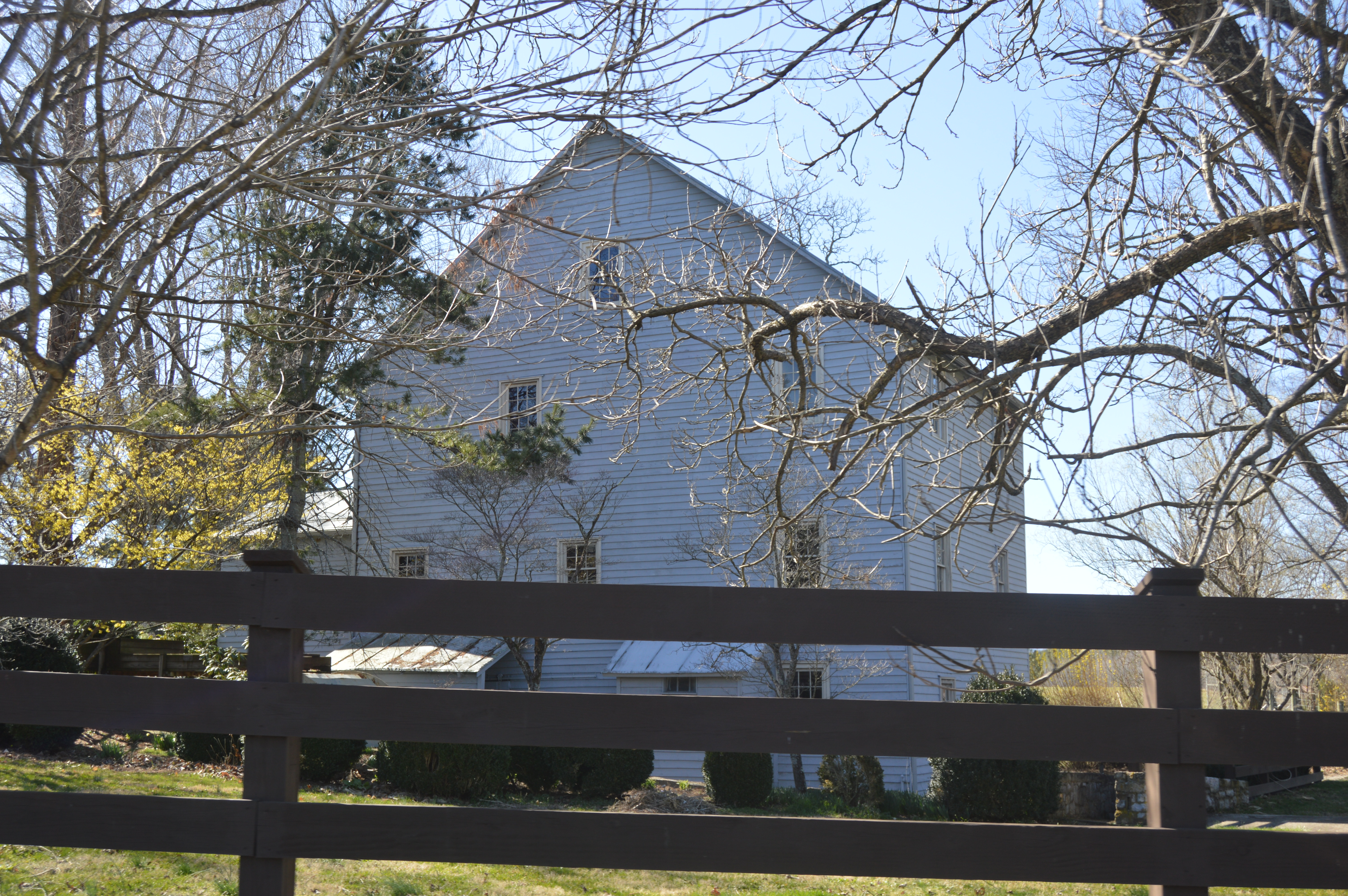
- Eastern side

- Location within Virginia Location within the United States
- Location: Junction of Hangers Mill Road and U.S. Route 250, Churchville, Virginia
- Coordinates: 38°13′10″N 79°8′9″W
- Area: 7.5 acres (3.0 ha)
- Built: 1860
- NRHP reference No.: 91001596
- VLR No.: 007-1211

Significant dates
- Added to NRHP: November 8, 1991
- Designated VLR: August 21, 1991, December 13, 2012

Hanger Mill, also known as Huff Mill, is a historic grist mill located at Churchville, Augusta County, Virginia, built about 1860. It is a 2 1/2-story, frame building on a stone foundation with an overshot wheel that operated until 1940. It has been partially restored, and retains most of its milling machinery.

It was listed on the National Register of Historic Places in 1991.

== History and description ==
The mill was built by Jacob Hanger on his 399-acre (161 ha) farm around 1860 as documented by tax records and a grist wheel dated 1861 with Hanger's name. Its overshot wheel was powered by water from Jennings Branch, a tributary of the Middle River. Unlike most mills in Augusta County, it was not burned during the American Civil War of 1861–1865 by Union forces. The wooden water wheel was replaced by a metal one in 1920. The mill ceased operations in 1940. As part of the mill's restoration, a new metal water wheel was installed in 2004, although the head race has not been reconstructed. As of that date it has remained in the hands of the family.

The mill is a 2 1/2-story, frame building that "has weatherboard siding, six-over-six double-hung sash windows, a metal-sheathed gable roof, and a coursed limestone ashlar foundation. Half of the ground-level story is also constructed of coursed limestone and the remaining part is frame. A small one-story frame office with a front porch is attached to the mill's south side. The original shed roof on the office was replaced with the existing gable roof by the present owner, and at the same time a limestone chimney was added to the addition. At the north end of the office porch there is an entrance into the mill featuring a Dutch door. This original door has an interior wooden rim lock, with a metal star design."

"The west elevation of the mill has a batten door on the upper three levels; these are aligned one above the other directly beneath the roof ridge. Above these doors at the ridge of the roof is a projecting hood for a pulley-operated sack hoist. North of the stacked doors, there is a batten door providing entry to the basement level. Off of the stone foundation on the east elevation there are metal gears for the wheel machinery, and an overshot wheel with the millrace. A shed-roofed addition with a concrete pier was added to enclose the machinery, and a shed-roofed privy was added north of this pier over the run."

"Most of the original interior fabric of the mill remains intact with the exception of the north half of the basement level which was remodeled in the 1960s into a shop with a concrete-slab floor and plywood-covered walls. The south haif of the basement level retains its coursed rubble walls, as well as a mixture of circular sawn, straight sawn, and hand-hewn structural members. While all of the basement framing has mortised and tenoned joints, there is evidence such as old mortises and notchings that indicates that some of the joists may have been reused from another structure. An open stringer staircase that extends from the basement to the fourth floor is located in the southwest corner of the basement. The east wall of the basement has a small door allowing access to the exterior machinery."

"A remarkable portion of the milling machinery remains intact in the mill. There are parts of two different machinery systems incorporated in the Hanger Mill: the millstone machinery and the roller press type; together they create a complete milling system."

== Bibliography ==
- Downs, Janet Baugher & Downs, Earl J. (2004). Mills of Augusta County. Augusta County Historical Society. ISBN 0-97527-453-8.
