= Stephen Harnsberger House =

Historic house in Virginia, United States

- U.S. National Register of Historic Places
- Virginia Landmarks Register
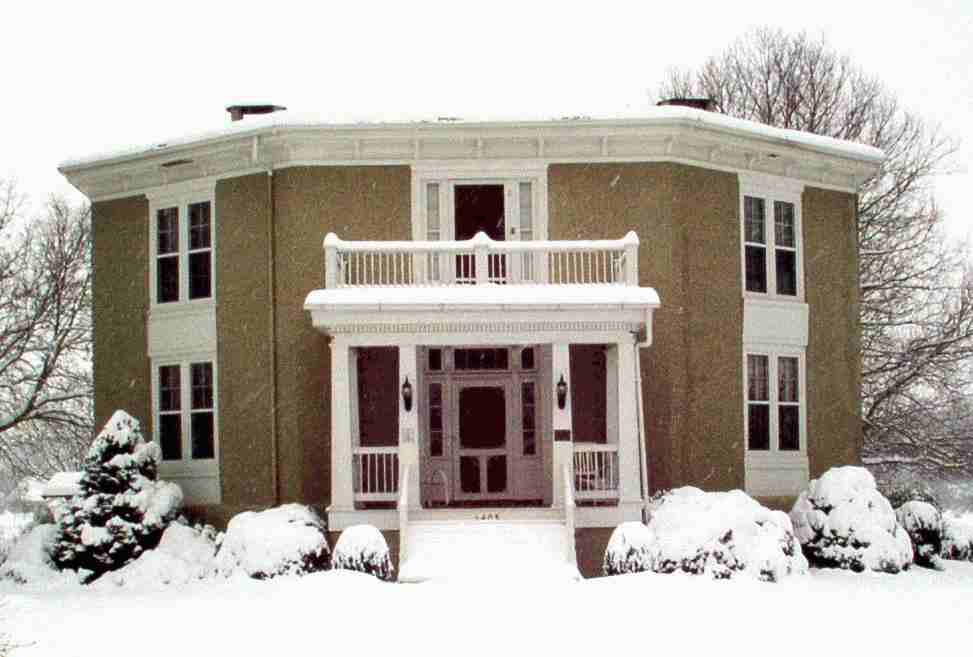
- Stephen Harnsberger House

- Location within Virginia Location within the United States
- Location: Holly Ave., Grottoes, Virginia
- Coordinates: 38°16′30″N 78°49′49″W
- Area: 6 acres (2.4 ha)
- Built: 1856
- Architectural style: Octagon Mode
- NRHP reference No.: 82004593
- VLR No.: 228-5022

Significant dates
- Added to NRHP: July 8, 1982
- Designated VLR: January 20, 1981

The Stephen Harnsberger House, also known as the Harnsberger Octagonal House, is an historic octagon house located on Holly Avenue in Grottoes, Virginia.

The house was built in 1856, three years after the publication of A Home For All, or the Gravel Wall and Octagon Mode of Building by Orson Squire Fowler. Rather than following the tenets of the book, which suggested a radially-oriented plan with functions for every side, the plan of the Harnsberger house is more akin to a traditional double-pile center-hall house of the kind that was prevalent in Virginia at the time. The center hall is flanked by two very deep rooms, with smaller rooms behind, divided from the front rooms by chimneys. On both the basement and second floor levels a central passage extends the depth of the house. This is in contrast to the wedge-shaped rooms advocated by Fowler.

The house exhibits Greek Revival detailing, typical of the time. Interior woodwork is mostly intact. The house received an ell addition to the rear housing a kitchen by 1890.

The house was added to the National Register of Historic Places on July 8, 1982. Harnsberger's brother Robert built an octagonal barn a few miles away in 1867, which is also listed on the National Register.
