= Staunton–Stuarts Draft metropolitan area =

Metropolitan area in Virginia, United States

Staunton Metropolitan Area
- Metropolitan Statistical Area
- Staunton–Waynesboro, Va. Metropolitan Statistical Area
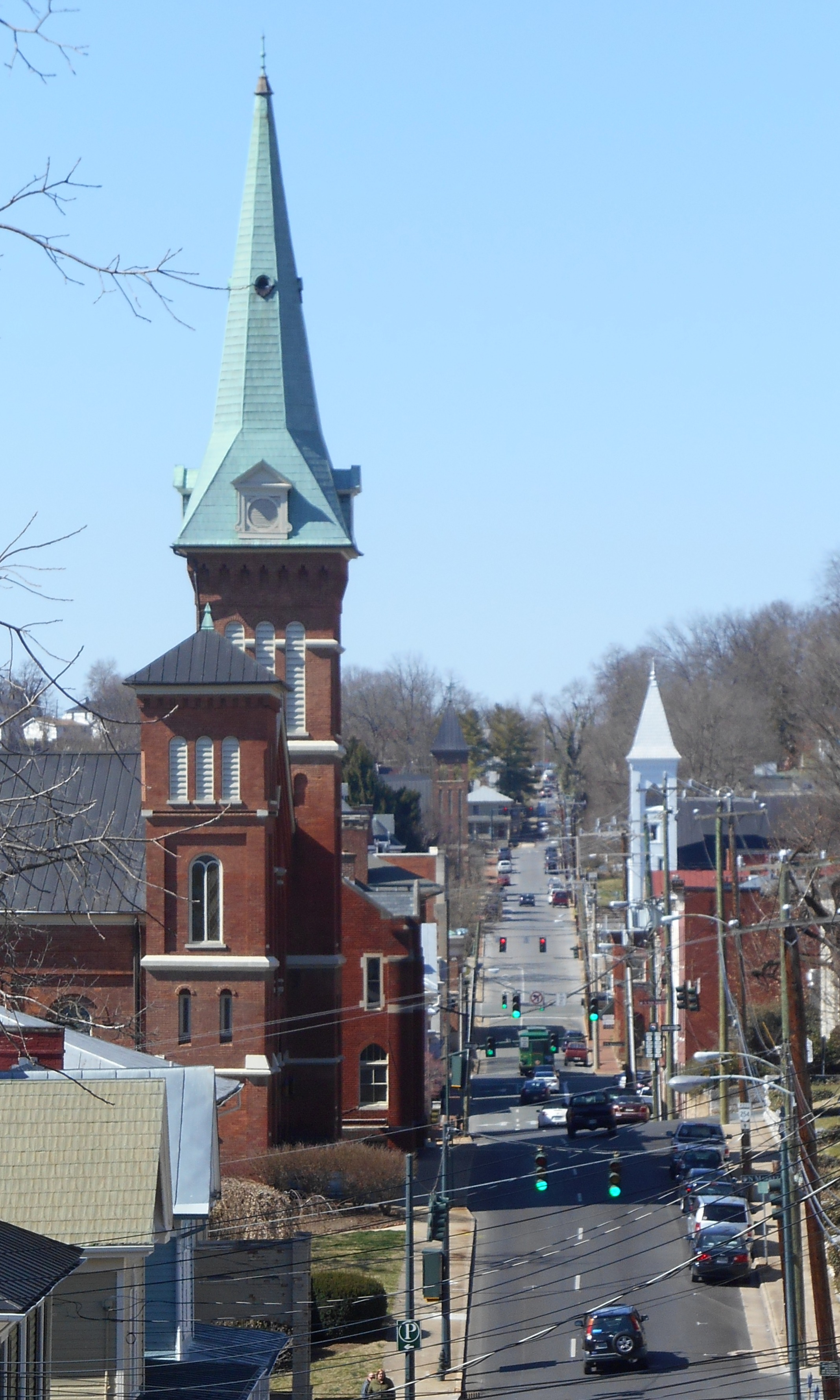
- Frederick Street
Map of Harrisonburg–Staunton–Stuarts Draft CSA
Harrisonburg, VA MSA
City of Harrisonburg
Staunton–Stuarts Draft MSA
City of Staunton
City of Waynesboro
- Country: United States
- State: Virginia
- Largest city: Staunton
- Other cities: Waynesboro
- Time zone: UTC−5 (EST)
  - Summer (DST): UTC−4 (EDT)
- Area code(s): 540, 826

The Staunton–Stuarts Draft Metropolitan Statistical Area, formerly the Staunton–Waynesboro Metropolitan Statistical Area, is a United States Metropolitan Statistical Area (MSA) in Virginia, as defined by the Office of Management and Budget (OMB). As of the 2020 census, the MSA had a population of 125,433.

== Components ==
Note: Since a state constitutional change in 1871, all cities in Virginia are independent cities that are not located in any county. The OMB considers these independent cities to be county-equivalents for the purpose of defining μSAs in Virginia.

One county and two independent cities are included in the Staunton–Stuarts Draft Metropolitan Statistical Area.

- Counties
  - Augusta
- Independent Cities
  - Staunton
  - Waynesboro

== Communities ==
=== Cities ===
- Staunton (principal city)
- Waynesboro (principal city)

=== Towns ===
- Craigsville
- Grottoes

=== Census-designated places ===
- Crimora
- Dooms
- Fishersville
- Greenville
- Jolivue
- Lyndhurst
- Sherando
- Stuarts Draft
- Verona
- Weyers Cave

=== Unincorporated places ===
- Churchville
- Fort Defiance
- Mount Solon
- Spring Hill

== Demographics ==
As of the census of 2010, there were 118,502 people, 47,899 households, and 32,370 families residing within the μSA. The racial makeup of the μSA was 89.4% White, 6.8% African American, 0.2% Native American, 0.6% Asian, 0.1% Pacific Islander, 1.1% from other races, and 1.8% from two or more races. Hispanic or Latino of any race were 2.8% of the population.

The median income for a household in the MSA was $46,292 and the median income for a family was $58,975. Males had a median income of $40,636 versus $31,670 for females. The per capita income for the USA was $21,577.

== See also ==
- Virginia census statistical areas
