= Lyndhurst, Virginia =

- CDP
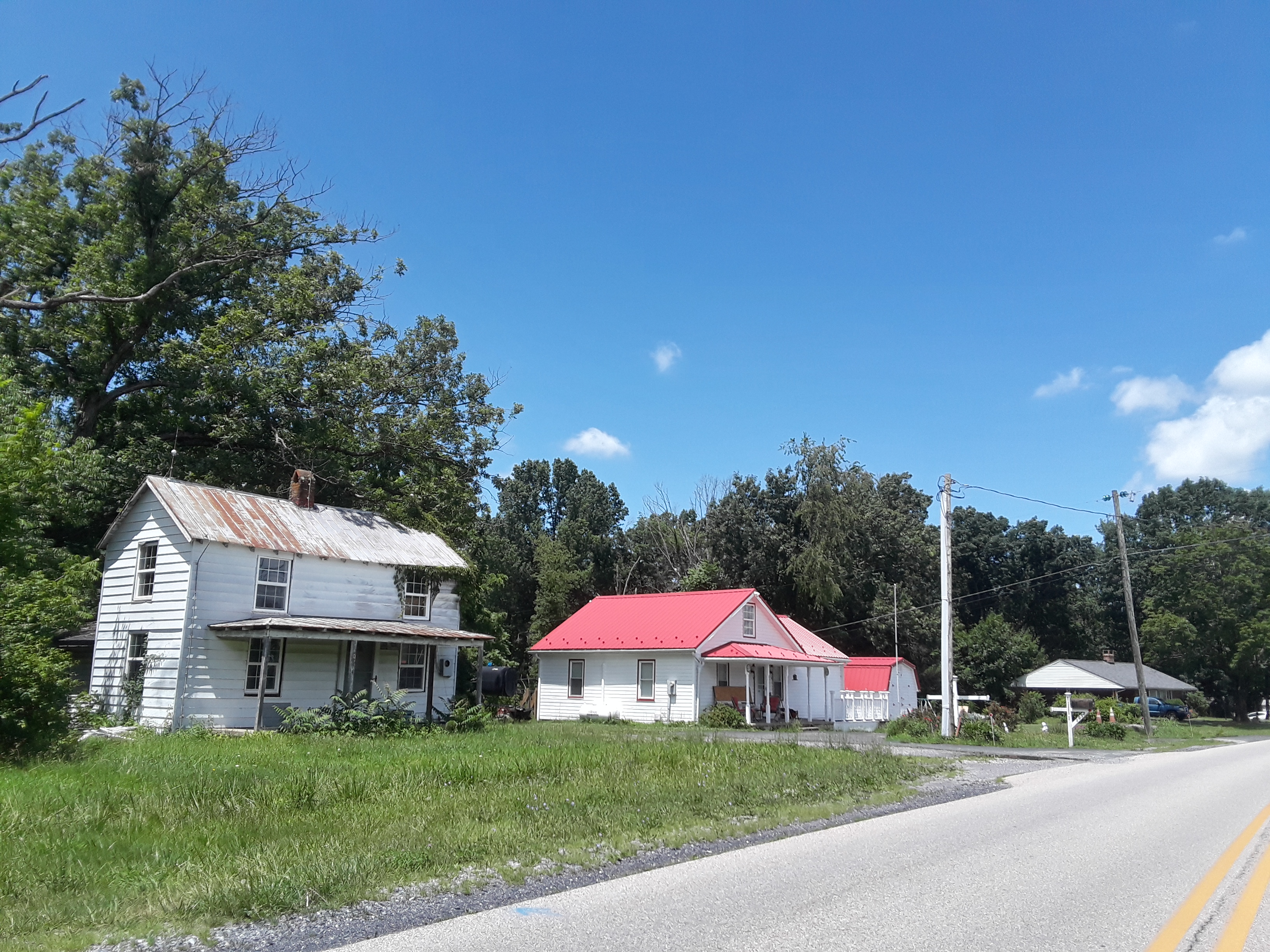
- Houses by the road in Lyndhurst.

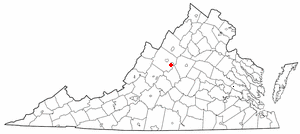
- Location of Lyndhurst, Virginia
- Coordinates: 38°1′35″N 78°57′5″W
- Country: United States
- State: Virginia
- County: Augusta

Area
  - Total: 6.1 sq mi (15.8 km^{2})
  - Land: 6.1 sq mi (15.8 km^{2})
  - Water: 0 sq mi (0.0 km^{2})
- Elevation: 1,394 ft (425 m)

Population (2020)
  - Total: 1,554
  - Density: 255/sq mi (98.4/km^{2})
- Time zone: UTC−5 (Eastern (EST))
  - Summer (DST): UTC−4 (EDT)
- ZIP code: 22952
- Area code: 540
- FIPS code: 51-47720
- GNIS feature ID: 1485136

Lyndhurst is a census-designated place (CDP) in Augusta County, Virginia, United States. As of the 2020 census, Lyndhurst had a population of 1,554. It is part of the Staunton–Waynesboro Micropolitan Statistical Area.

== Geography ==
Lyndhurst is located at 38°1′35″N 78°57′5″W (38.026381, −78.951379).

According to the United States Census Bureau, the CDP has a total area of 6.1 square miles (15.8 km^{2}), of which 6.1 square miles (15.8 km^{2}) is land and 0.16% is water.

== Demographics ==
Historical population
Census	Pop.	Note	%±
2000	1,527		—
2010	1,490		−2.4%
2020	1,554		4.3%
U.S. Decennial Census; 2000 2010 2020

Lyndhurst was first listed as a census designated place in the 2000 U.S. census.

=== 2020 census ===
As of the 2020 census, Lyndhurst had a population of 1,554. The median age was 47.5 years. 17.8% of residents were under the age of 18 and 21.7% of residents were 65 years of age or older. For every 100 females there were 97.5 males, and for every 100 females age 18 and over there were 97.7 males age 18 and over.

11.3% of residents lived in urban areas, while 88.7% lived in rural areas.

There were 629 households in Lyndhurst, of which 27.8% had children under the age of 18 living in them. Of all households, 59.6% were married-couple households, 14.6% were households with a male householder and no spouse or partner present, and 20.0% were households with a female householder and no spouse or partner present. About 21.8% of all households were made up of individuals and 12.7% had someone living alone who was 65 years of age or older.

There were 657 housing units, of which 4.3% were vacant. The homeowner vacancy rate was 0.9% and the rental vacancy rate was 2.9%.

Racial composition as of the 2020 census
Race	Number	Percent
White	1,370	88.2%
Black or African American	82	5.3%
American Indian and Alaska Native	4	0.3%
Asian	11	0.7%
Native Hawaiian and Other Pacific Islander	0	0.0%
Some other race	29	1.9%
Two or more races	58	3.7%
Hispanic or Latino (of any race)	55	3.5%

=== 2000 census ===
As of the census of 2000, there were 1,527 people, 580 households, and 447 families residing in the CDP. The population density was 250.6 people per square mile (96.8/km^{2}). There were 602 housing units at an average density of 98.8/sq mi (38.2/km^{2}). The racial makeup of the CDP was 93.12% White, 5.17% African American, 0.13% Native American, 0.26% Asian, 0.72% from other races, and 0.59% from two or more races. Hispanic or Latino of any race were 1.90% of the population.

There were 580 households, out of which 30.3% had children under the age of 18 living with them, 65.3% were married couples living together, 7.6% had a female householder with no husband present, and 22.9% were non-families. 19.8% of all households were made up of individuals, and 9.3% had someone living alone who was 65 years of age or older. The average household size was 2.61 and the average family size was 3.00.

In the CDP, the population was spread out, with 23.6% under the age of 18, 6.9% from 18 to 24, 27.3% from 25 to 44, 29.0% from 45 to 64, and 13.1% who were 65 years of age or older. The median age was 40 years. For every 100 females there were 96.5 males. For every 100 females age 18 and over, there were 96.6 males.

The median income for a household in the CDP was $45,165, and the median income for a family was $47,075. Males had a median income of $38,472 versus $20,640 for females. The per capita income for the CDP was $18,467. About 4.7% of families and 7.6% of the population were below the poverty line, including 10.7% of those under age 18 and 6.7% of those age 65 or over.
