= Churchville, Virginia =

Churchville
- Census-designated place
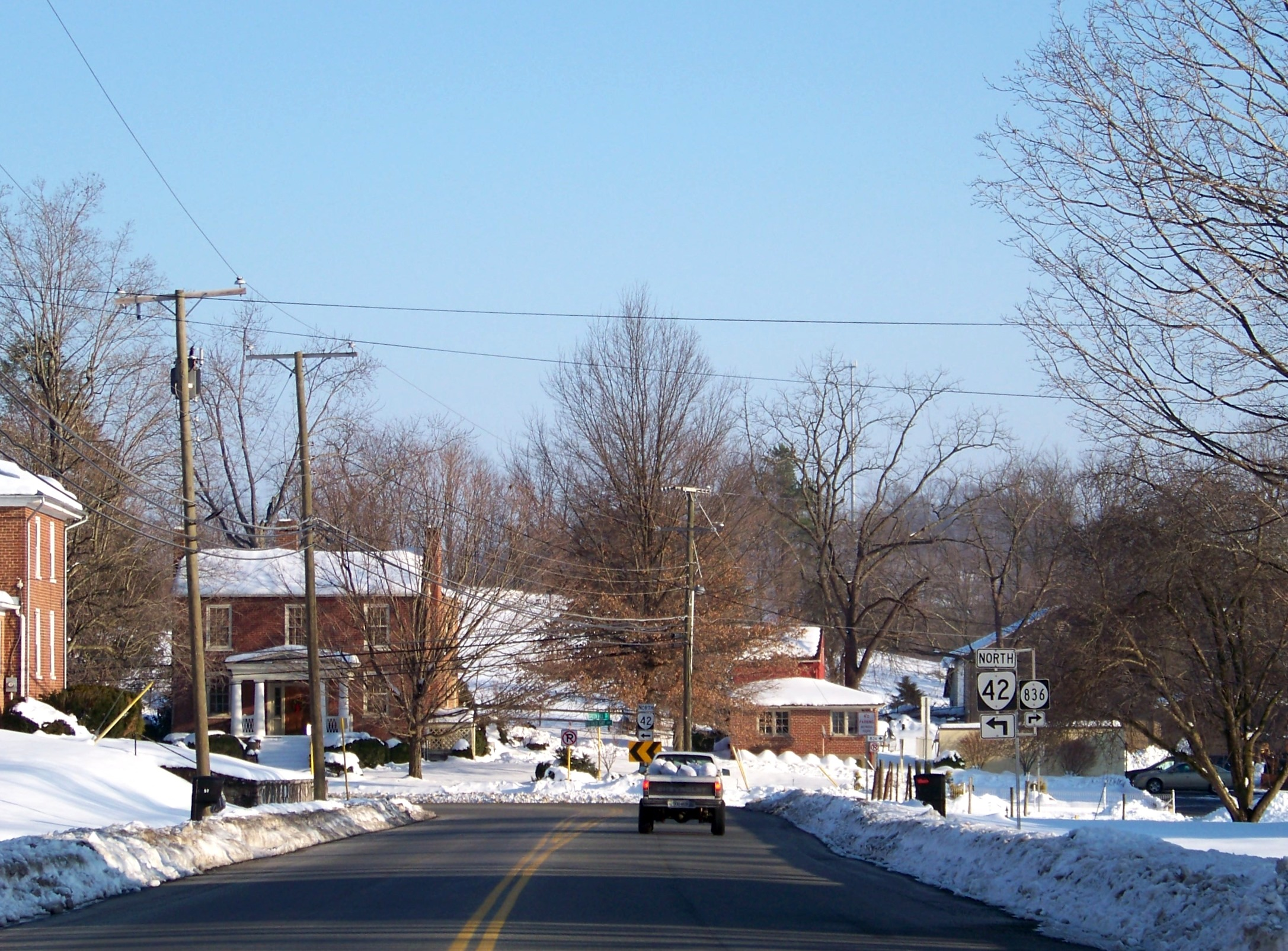

- Location in the Commonwealth of Virginia Churchville (the United States)
- Coordinates: 38°13′34″N 79°09′44″W
- Country: United States
- State: Virginia
- County: Augusta County
- Elevation: 1,424 ft (434 m)

Population (2020)
  - Total: 195
- Time zone: UTC−5 (EST)
  - Summer (DST): UTC−4 (EDT)
- GNIS feature ID: 1492769

Churchville is a census-designated place (CDP) in the western part of Augusta County, Virginia, United States. As of the 2020 census, Churchville had a population of 195. Churchville is part of the Staunton–Waynesboro Micropolitan Statistical Area.

An 1855 gazetteer described the village as a stagecoach stop that contained "2 churches, 2 stores, and 2 schools."

Hanger Mill was listed on the National Register of Historic Places in 1991.

== Demographics ==
Historical population
Census	Pop.	Note	%±
2020	195		—
U.S. Decennial Census; 2010 2020

Churchville was first listed as a census designated place in the 2010 U.S. census.
