= Love, Virginia =

Unincorporated community in Virginia, United States

Love
- Unincorporated community
- Location within Virginia Location within the United States
- Coordinates: 37°53′07″N 79°00′36″W
- Country: United States
- State: Virginia
- County: Augusta
- Elevation: 2,608 ft (795 m)
- Time zone: UTC-5 (Eastern (EST))
  - Summer (DST): UTC-4 (EDT)
- Area code: 540
- GNIS feature ID: 1493229

Love is an unincorporated community in Augusta County, Virginia, United States.

Love is located on the Blue Ridge Parkway, within the Mount Pleasant National Scenic Area.

The Royal Oaks Cabins, and a small cemetery, are located in Love.
