= Valley Railroad Bridge =

- U.S. National Register of Historic Places
- Virginia Landmarks Register
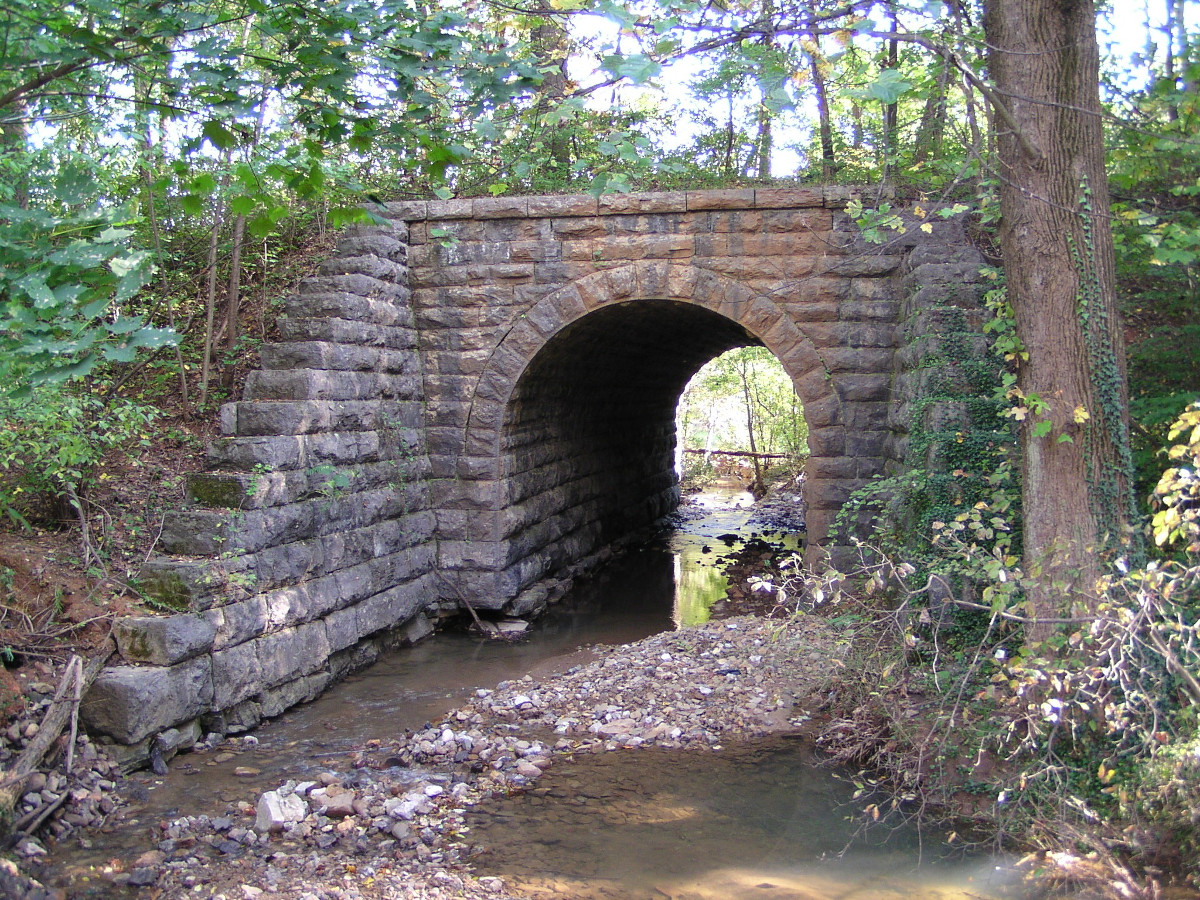
- Valley Railroad Bridge, facing south

- Location within Virginia Location within the United States
- Location: 1002 Newman Dr., Salem, Virginia
- Coordinates: 37°18′14″N 80°2′43″W
- Area: Less than 1 acre (0.40 ha)
- Built: 1873
- Architect: Thomas K. Menifee
- NRHP reference No.: 09000617
- VLR No.: 129-5023

Significant dates
- Added to NRHP: August 12, 2009
- Designated VLR: June 18, 2009

Valley Railroad Bridge or Gish Branch Bridge is a historic limestone arch bridge located over Gish Branch at Salem, Virginia. It was built in 1873 by the firm of Claiborne Rice (C.R.) Mason, under the local guidance of Thomas Menifee, engineer and employee of Mason. Mason was head of a syndicate hoping to link major railways of the north and south at Salem, Virginia - specifically by linking the Atlantic, Mississippi and Ohio Railroad with the Baltimore and Ohio Railroad, two of the major railways of the era.

Menifee and the other members of the Mason Syndicate began work on May 20, 1873. By late November 1874, the roadbed had been brought to grade from the Botetourt county line to the outskirts of Salem just south of Gish Branch, named for its crossing the homestead of farmer John Abraham Gish, one of the many German settlers in the region. All but the major stream crossings (Carvins, Peters, and Mason Creeks) were complete, awaiting additional funding. However, the September 1873 national financial panic and the resulting depression led the Mason Syndicate to abandon the Salem and Lexington connection. Today, the Gish Branch Bridge is an important part of the Roanoke Valley's railroad heritage. It is the largest of the three remaining arch structures built by Menifee, the other structures and much of the completed roadbed destroyed by the passage of time and the increasing residential development of the area.

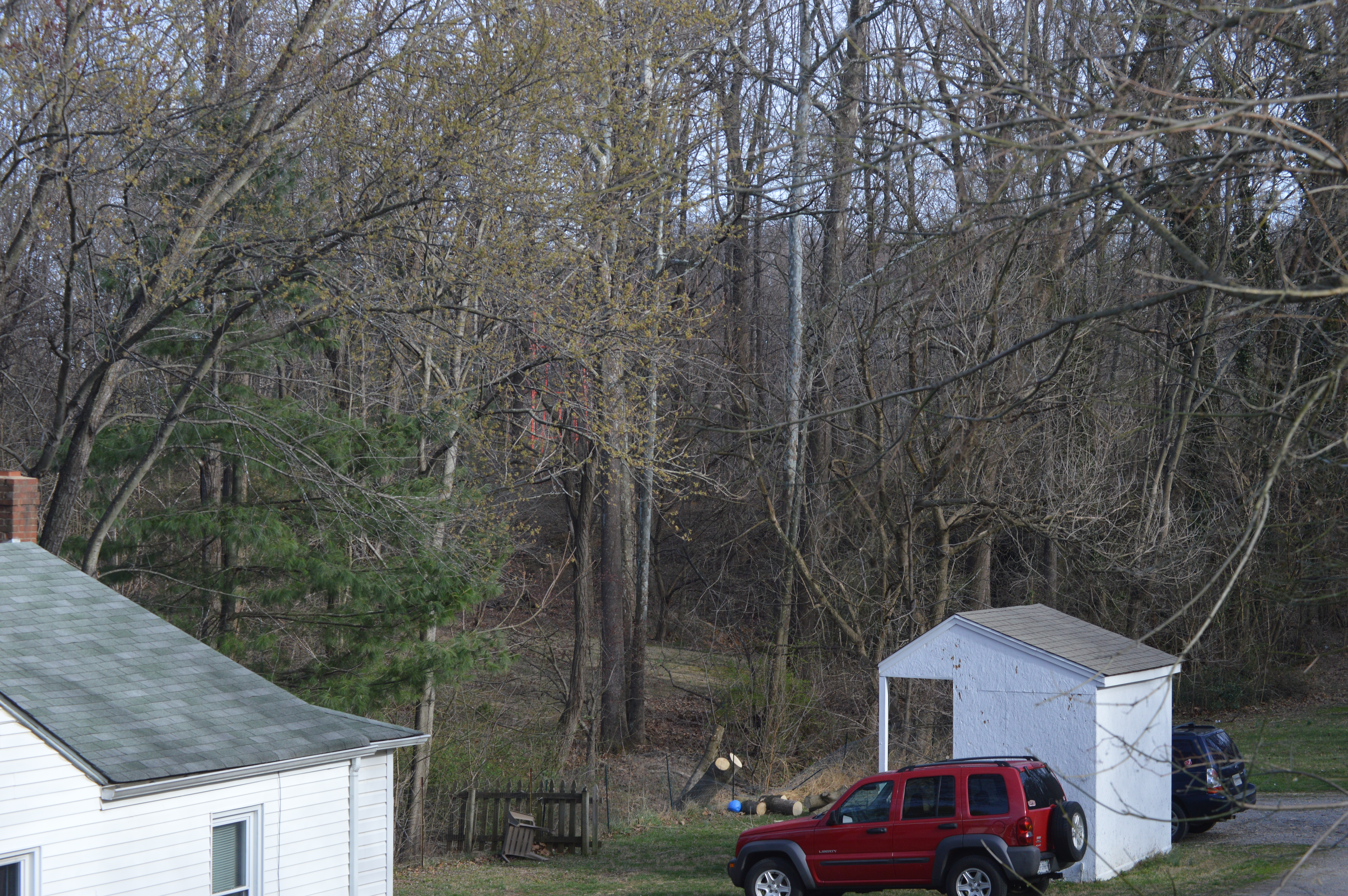
Looking toward the bridge from Mill Road

The Valley Railroad Bridge is a single-span, barrel-vaulted stone structure. The bridge structure is a semi-circular vaulted tunnel through a man-made earthen embankment. The bridge is an architecturally significant remnant of an unrealized transportation scheme dating to the Reconstruction Era following the American Civil War. The Valley Railroad was never completed to Salem, therefore the bridge, constructed in 1873, never fulfilled its intended purpose.

The bridge was added to the National Register of Historic Places in 2009. The length of the vaulted structure is 69 feet, not counting the flared, stepped, wing walls at both ends. The span is of the arch is 12 feet, and the keystones at each end of the barrel are 15 feet above the creek. The blocks of limestone, thought to have been quarried nearby, are squared, with roughly-dressed faces, and laid in distinct courses. The stones in the side walls are quite large, measuring up to 4 1/2 feet long, 26 inches tall, and perhaps 2 or more feet wide. The voussoirs— stones within the vaulted ceiling— are smaller and more narrow in dimensions, appearing outwardly as uniform, almost square wedges. Outside the vault, the spandrel walls rise up to the rail bed, where a top course of limestone blocks, projecting slightly beyond the spandrel's vertical plane, creates a parapet rising above the rail bed. The roughly-dressed faces of the stones are a form of rustication, intended to give the structure an ancient appearance.

== See also ==
- Valley Railroad Stone Bridge
