= Verona, Virginia =

- CDP
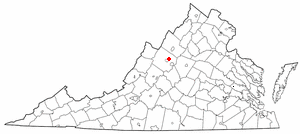
- Location of Verona, Virginia
- Coordinates: 38°11′49″N 79°0′11″W
- Country: United States
- State: Virginia
- County: Augusta

Area
  - Total: 7.0 sq mi (18.2 km^{2})
  - Land: 7.0 sq mi (18.2 km^{2})
  - Water: 0 sq mi (0.0 km^{2})
- Elevation: 1,293 ft (394 m)

Population (2010)
  - Total: 4,239
  - Density: 603/sq mi (232.9/km^{2})
- Time zone: UTC−5 (Eastern (EST))
  - Summer (DST): UTC−4 (EDT)
- ZIP code: 24482
- Area code: 540
- FIPS code: 51-80864
- GNIS feature ID: 1500256

Verona is a census-designated place (CDP) in and the de facto county seat of Augusta County, Virginia, United States. As of the 2020 census, Verona had a population of 4,398. It is part of the Staunton–Waynesboro Micropolitan Statistical Area.

== History ==
Mount Airy and Verona School are listed on the National Register of Historic Places.

Augusta County has announced in 2021 a plan to move the county seat from Staunton to Verona.

== Geography ==
Verona is located at 38°11′49″N 79°0′11″W (38.197048, −79.003116).

According to the United States Census Bureau, the CDP has a total area of 7.0 square miles (18.2 km^{2}), of which 7.0 square miles (18.2 km^{2}) is land and 0.14% is water.

== Demographics ==
|2020= 4398

Historical population
Census	Pop.	Note	%±
2000	3,368		—
2010	4,239		25.9%
2020	4,398		3.8%
U.S. Decennial Census; 2010 2020

As of the census of 2010, there were 4,239 people, 1,457 households, and 984 families residing in the CDP. The population density was 605.6 people per square mile (232.9/km^{2}). There were 1,556 housing units at an average density of 222.3/sq mi (85.5/km^{2}). The racial makeup of the CDP was 88.7% White, 8.3% African American, 0.4% Native American, 0.7% Asian, 0.7% from other races, and 1.3% from two or more races. Hispanic or Latino of any race were 2.8% of the population.

There were 1,457 households, out of which 31.0% had children under the age of 18 living with them, 49.8% were married couples living together, 12.5% had a female householder with no husband present, and 32.5% were non-families. 26.4% of all households were made up of individuals, and 10.7% had someone living alone who was 65 years of age or older. The average household size was 2.40 and the average family size was 2.87.

In the CDP, the population was spread out, with 18.8% under the age of 18, 9.3% from 18 to 24, 31.8% from 25 to 44, 27.4% from 45 to 64, and 12.7% who were 65 years of age or older. The median age was 38.8 years. For every 100 females there were 131 males. For every 100 females age 18 and over, there were 138.4 males age 18 and over.

The median income for a household in the CDP was $42,109, and the median income for a family was $51,061. Males had a median income of $42,648 versus $31,955 for females. The per capita income for the CDP was $19,439. About 10.7% of families and 15.4% of the population were below the poverty line, including 20.3% of those under age 18 and 7.9% of those age 65 or over.
