= Sherando, Virginia =

- CDP
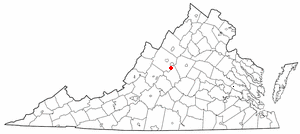
- Location of Sherando, Virginia
- Coordinates: 37°59′25″N 78°57′4″W
- Country: United States
- State: Virginia
- County: Augusta

Area
  - Total: 7.0 sq mi (18.2 km^{2})
  - Land: 7.0 sq mi (18.2 km^{2})
  - Water: 0 sq mi (0.0 km^{2})
- Elevation: 1,470 ft (448 m)

Population (2010)
  - Total: 688
  - Density: 97.9/sq mi (37.8/km^{2})
- Time zone: UTC−5 (Eastern (EST))
  - Summer (DST): UTC−4 (EDT)
- ZIP code: 22952
- Area code: 540
- FIPS code: 51-71904
- GNIS feature ID: 1500091

Sherando is a census-designated place (CDP) in Augusta County, Virginia, United States. As of the 2020 census, Sherando had a population of 696. It is part of the Staunton–Waynesboro Micropolitan Statistical Area.

== History ==
Mt. Torry Furnace was listed on the National Register of Historic Places in 1974.

== Geography ==
Sherando is located at 37°59′25″N 78°57′4″W (37.990334, −78.950983).

According to the United States Census Bureau, the CDP has a total area of 7.1 square miles (18.3 km^{2}), of which 7.0 square miles (18.2 km^{2}) is land and 0.04 square mile (0.1 km^{2}) (0.28%) is water.

== Demographics ==
Historical population
Census	Pop.	Note	%±
2000	665		—
2020	696		—
U.S. Decennial Census; 2000 2010 2020

Sherando was first listed as a census designated place in the 2000 U.S. census.

As of the census of 2000, there were 665 people, 270 households, and 207 families residing in the CDP. The population density was 94.6 people per square mile (36.5/km^{2}). There were 281 housing units at an average density of 40.0/sq mi (15.4/km^{2}). The racial makeup of the CDP was 96.39% White, 1.20% African American, 0.60% Native American, 0.45% Asian, 0.60% from other races, and 0.75% from two or more races. Hispanic or Latino of any race were 0.75% of the population.

There were 270 households, out of which 33.0% had children under the age of 18 living with them, 57.0% were married couples living together, 12.6% had a female householder with no husband present, and 23.3% were non-families. 18.5% of all households were made up of individuals, and 6.3% had someone living alone who was 65 years of age or older. The average household size was 2.46 and the average family size was 2.73.

In the CDP, the population was spread out, with 23.2% under the age of 18, 6.5% from 18 to 24, 34.1% from 25 to 44, 25.6% from 45 to 64, and 10.7% who were 65 years of age or older. The median age was 38 years. For every 100 females there were 98.5 males. For every 100 females age 18 and over, there were 93.6 males.

The median income for a household in the CDP was $38,170, and the median income for a family was $39,732. Males had a median income of $32,500 versus $23,523 for females. The per capita income for the CDP was $17,218. About 7.7% of families and 13.7% of the population were below the poverty line, including 15.8% of those under age 18 and 20.0% of those age 65 or over.
