= Spring Hill, Virginia =

Unincorporated community in Virginia, United States

- Unincorporated community
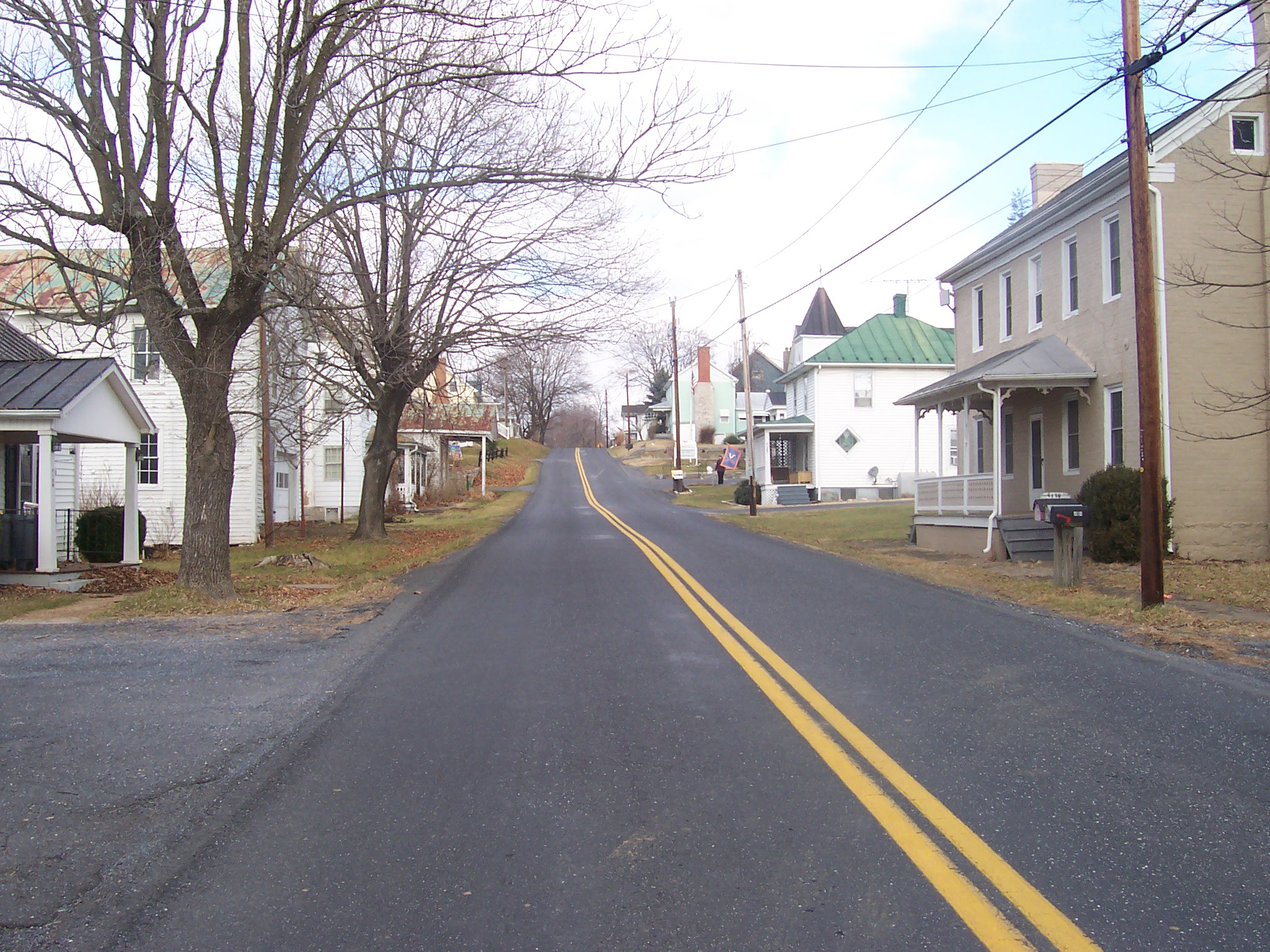
- Spring Hill on Springhill Road

- Location within Virginia Location within the United States
- Coordinates: 38°15′22″N 79°03′09″W
- Country: United States
- State: Virginia
- County: Augusta
- Elevation: 1,427 ft (435 m)
- Time zone: UTC−5 (Eastern (EST))
  - Summer (DST): UTC−4 (EDT)
- GNIS feature ID: 1497159

Spring Hill is an unincorporated community in Augusta County, Virginia, United States.

The earliest European inhabitant was the Irish sea captain James Patton, whose first home was a log cabin he built in 1741 at Spring Hill, on what is still known as the Patton Farm Road. On 25 October 1746, On 15 January 1754, Patton signed a contract with two Augusta County carpenters to construct a new home for him at Spring Hill: "a solidly-made a one-room log house, twenty feet square, to include...a wooden floor, high ceiling, and spacious loft."

In 1882, Spring Hill was a thriving village with several stores and two churches. It, like other communities in Augusta County, flourished into the early 1900s. Today, all that is left is a Presbyterian church, some houses, and a few abandoned storefronts. It is part of the Staunton–Waynesboro Micropolitan Statistical Area.
