= Augusta Springs, Virginia =

- CDP
- Location within Virginia
- Coordinates: 38°06′29″N 79°20′07″W
- Country: United States
- State: Virginia
- County: Augusta
- Time zone: UTC-5 (Eastern (EST))
  - Summer (DST): UTC-4 (EDT)
- GNIS feature ID: 2584801

Augusta Springs is a census-designated place (CDP) in Augusta County, Virginia, United States. As of the 2020 census, Augusta Springs had a population of 236.

== Demographics ==
Historical population
Census	Pop.	Note	%±
2020	236		—
U.S. Decennial Census; 2010 2020

Augusta Springs was first listed as a census designated place in the 2010 U.S. census.
