= Jolivue, Virginia =

- Census-designated place
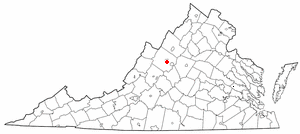
- Location of Jolivue, Virginia
- Coordinates: 38°6′55″N 79°4′18″W
- Country: United States
- State: Virginia
- County: Augusta

Area
  - Total: 1.9 sq mi (4.9 km^{2})
  - Land: 1.9 sq mi (4.9 km^{2})
  - Water: 0 sq mi (0.0 km^{2})
- Elevation: 1,601 ft (488 m)

Population (2020)
  - Total: 1,168
  - Density: 595/sq mi (229.9/km^{2})
- Time zone: UTC−5 (Eastern (EST))
  - Summer (DST): UTC−4 (EDT)
- FIPS code: 51-41144
- GNIS feature ID: 1499610

Jolivue is a census-designated place (CDP) in Augusta County, Virginia, United States. As of the 2020 census, Jolivue had a population of 1,168. It is part of the Staunton–Waynesboro Micropolitan Statistical Area.

== History ==
Located near Jolivue is the Valley Railroad Stone Bridge, listed on the National Register of Historic Places in 1974.

== Geography ==
Jolivue is located at 38°6′55″N 79°4′18″W (38.115146, −79.071791).

According to the United States Census Bureau, the CDP has a total area of 1.9 square miles (4.9 km^{2}), all land.

== Demographics ==
|2020= 1168

Historical population
Census	Pop.	Note	%±
2000	1,037		—
2010	1,129		8.9%
2020	1,168		3.5%
U.S. Decennial Census; 2010 2020

As of the census of 2000, there were 1,037 people, 551 households, and 249 families residing in the CDP. The population density was 527.2 people per square mile (203.2/km^{2}). There were 594 housing units at an average density of 302.0/sq mi (116.4/km^{2}). The racial makeup of the CDP was 92.67% White, 2.80% African American, 1.54% Asian, 0.96% from other races, and 2.03% from two or more races. Hispanic or Latino of any race were 3.09% of the population.

There were 551 households, out of which 17.8% had children under the age of 18 living with them, 34.5% were married couples living together, 7.8% had a female householder with no husband present, and 54.8% were non-families. 49.4% of all households were made up of individuals, and 26.7% had someone living alone who was 65 years of age or older. The average household size was 1.88 and the average family size was 2.76.

In the CDP, the population was spread out, with 17.7% under the age of 18, 6.1% from 18 to 24, 30.3% from 25 to 44, 20.9% from 45 to 64, and 25.0% who were 65 years of age or older. The median age was 42 years. For every 100 females there were 74.3 males. For every 100 females age 18 and over, there were 70.6 males.

The median income for a household in the CDP was $27,672, and the median income for a family was $40,150. Males had a median income of $29,313 versus $25,395 for females. The per capita income for the CDP was $18,905. About 6.0% of families and 10.4% of the population were below the poverty line, including 21.5% of those under age 18 and 13.7% of those age 65 or over.

== Climate ==
The climate in this area is characterized by hot, humid summers and generally mild to cool winters. According to the Köppen Climate Classification system, Jolivue has a humid subtropical climate, abbreviated "Cfa" on climate maps.
