= Dooms, Virginia =

- CDP
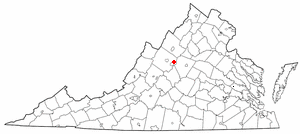
- Location of Dooms, Virginia
- Coordinates: 38°6′8″N 78°51′13″W
- Country: United States
- State: Virginia
- County: Augusta

Area
  - Total: 4.0 sq mi (10.3 km^{2})
  - Land: 4.0 sq mi (10.3 km^{2})
  - Water: 0 sq mi (0.0 km^{2})
- Elevation: 1,263 ft (385 m)

Population (2020)
  - Total: 1,279
  - Density: 322/sq mi (124/km^{2})
- Time zone: UTC−5 (Eastern (EST))
  - Summer (DST): UTC−4 (EDT)
- FIPS code: 51-22976
- GNIS feature ID: 1499350

Dooms is a census-designated place (CDP) in Augusta County, Virginia, United States. As of the 2020 census, Dooms had a population of 1,279. It is part of the Staunton–Waynesboro Micropolitan Statistical Area.

== Geography ==
Dooms is located at 38°6′8″N 78°51′13″W (38.102255, −78.853735).

According to the United States Census Bureau, the CDP has a total area of 4.0 square miles (10 km^{2}), all land.

== Demographics ==
|2020= 1279

Historical population
Census	Pop.	Note	%±
2000	1,282		—
2010	1,327		3.5%
2020	1,279		−3.6%
U.S. Decennial Census; 2010 2020

As of the census of 2000, there were 1,282 people, 522 households, and 386 families residing in the CDP. The population density was 323.0 people per square mile (124.7 people/km^{2}). There were 553 housing units at an average density of 139.3 units per square mile (53.8 units/km^{2}). The racial makeup of the CDP was 97.43% White, 1.33% African American, 0.08% Asian, and 1.17% from two or more races. Hispanic or Latino of any race were 0.62% of the population.

There were 522 households, out of which 26.6% had children under the age of 18 living with them, 59.8% were married couples living together, 9.4% had a female householder with no husband present, and 25.9% were non-families. 21.1% of all households were made up of individuals, and 10.2% had someone living alone who was 65 years of age or older. The average household size was 2.40 and the average family size was 2.77.

In the CDP, the population was spread out, with 21.4% under the age of 18, 4.8% from 18 to 24, 29.6% from 25 to 44, 28.6% from 45 to 64, and 15.6% who were 65 years of age or older. The median age was 42 years. For every 100 females there were 94.8 males. For every 100 females age 18 and over, there were 92.0 males.

The median income for a household in the CDP was $31,940, and the median income for a family was $37,800. Males had a median income of $29,347 versus $24,083 for females. The per capita income for the CDP was $24,600. About 9.0% of families and 10.0% of the population were below the poverty line, including 8.7% of those under age 18 and 8.3% of those age 65 or over.
