= Grottoes, Virginia =

- Town
- Seal

- Location of Grottoes within the Rockingham County

- Location in Virginia Grottoes, Virginia (the United States)
- Coordinates: 38°16′3″N 78°49′30″W
- Country: United States
- State: Virginia
- Counties: Rockingham, Augusta

Area
  - Total: 2.07 sq mi (5.37 km^{2})
  - Land: 2.04 sq mi (5.28 km^{2})
  - Water: 0.035 sq mi (0.09 km^{2})
- Elevation: 1,112 ft (339 m)

Population (2010)
  - Total: 2,899
  - Estimate (2019): 2,860
  - Density: 1,402.6/sq mi (541.56/km^{2})
- Time zone: UTC-5 (Eastern (EST))
  - Summer (DST): UTC-4 (EDT)
- ZIP code: 24441
- Area code: 540
- FIPS code: 51-33488
- GNIS feature ID: 1495628
- Website: Official website

Grottoes is a town in Rockingham and Augusta counties in the Commonwealth of Virginia, United States. The population was 2,899 at the 2020 census. The town lies right on the border with Augusta County, and several commercial, residential, and recreational lots have portions within Augusta County.

The town is part of the Harrisonburg metropolitan area, while the small portion that extends into Augusta County is part of the Staunton-Waynesboro micropolitan area.

Grottoes is home to Grand Caverns which opened for tours in 1806, making it the oldest show cave in the United States.

== History ==
The town was previously known as Liola in the 1880s, then briefly called Grottoes (meaning "caves") in 1889. A group of land speculators formally founded Shendun, a combination of "Shenandoah" and the Gaelic word "dun" meaning 'castle' or 'fortified hill', in 1892. Through a series of financial missteps, the Shendun Corporation went bankrupt in 1893. On March 11, 1912 the name was officially changed back to Grottoes.

Situated between the South Fork of the Shenandoah River and Brown's Gap, the town benefited from easy access to surrounding towns and natural resources. In 1933 a Civilian Conservation Corps Camp No. 1369 was established 3 miles east of Grottoes, and they built trails and roads into Shenandoah National Park that still exist today. The former CCC camp also served as Civilian Public Service Camp No. 4, a place for conscientious objectors to serve during World War II, and around 100 young Mennonite men lived and worked within four main categories: Soil Conservation, Forestry Service, National Park Service, and Land Reclamation Service.

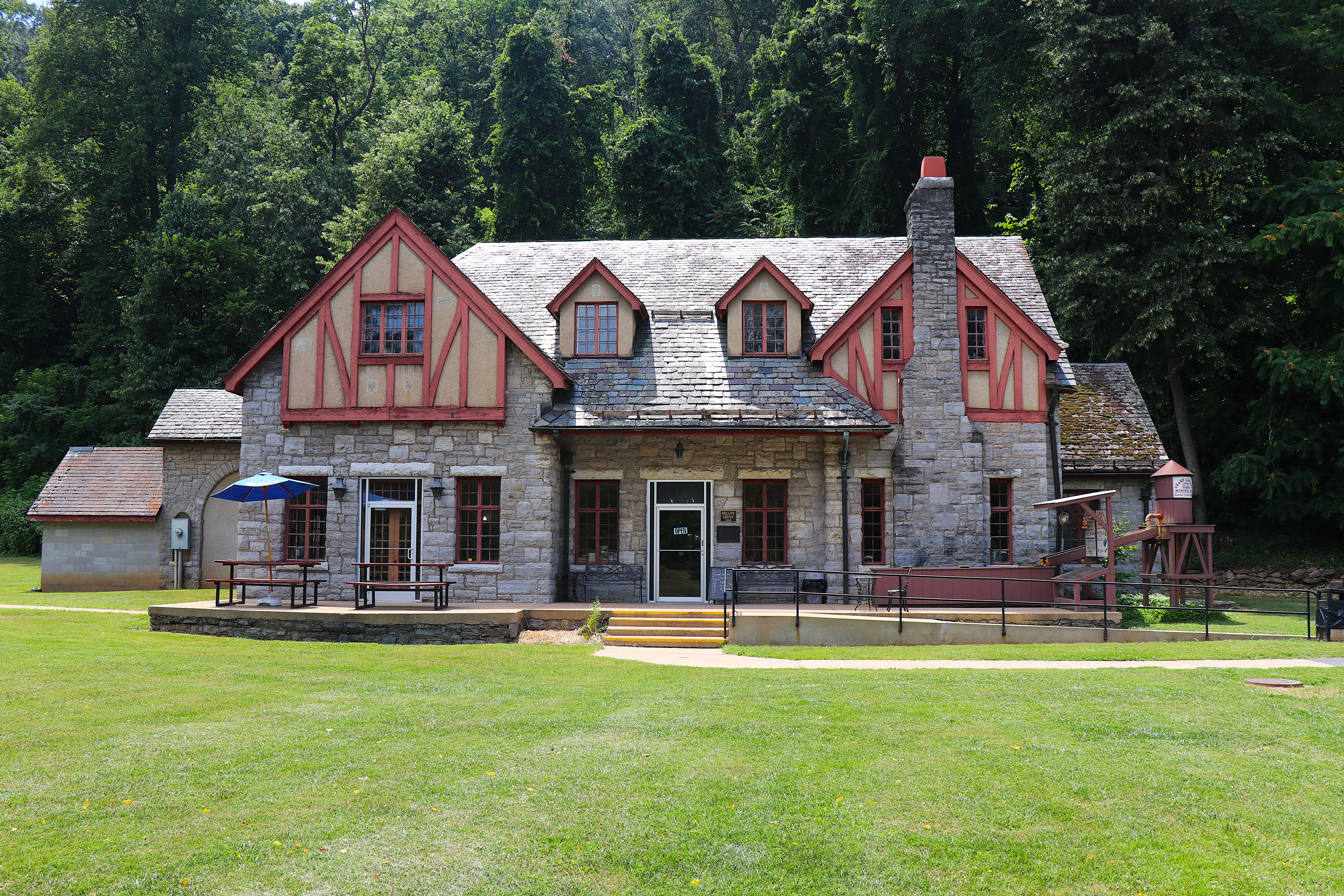
Grand Caverns Lodge (c. 1925) serves as the Grand Caverns tourism center and gift shop today.

Grand Caverns was designated a National Natural Landmark by the National Park Service in 1973. The Stephen Harnsberger House was listed on the National Register of Historic Places in 1982.

== Geography ==
Grottoes is located at 38°16′3″N 78°49′30″W (38.267385, −78.824868) in the Shenandoah Valley. According to the United States Census Bureau, the town has a total area of 1.3 square miles (3.4 km^{2}), all land.

The geographical location, within 15 miles of Waynesboro, Staunton, Harrisonburg, and Elkton, continues to be a major asset of the town. Additionally Grottoes is 43 miles from Charlottesville, 87 miles from Winchester, and 105 miles from Roanoke. Major geographic features in the area include Skyline Drive, Massanutten Peak, and Natural Chimneys.

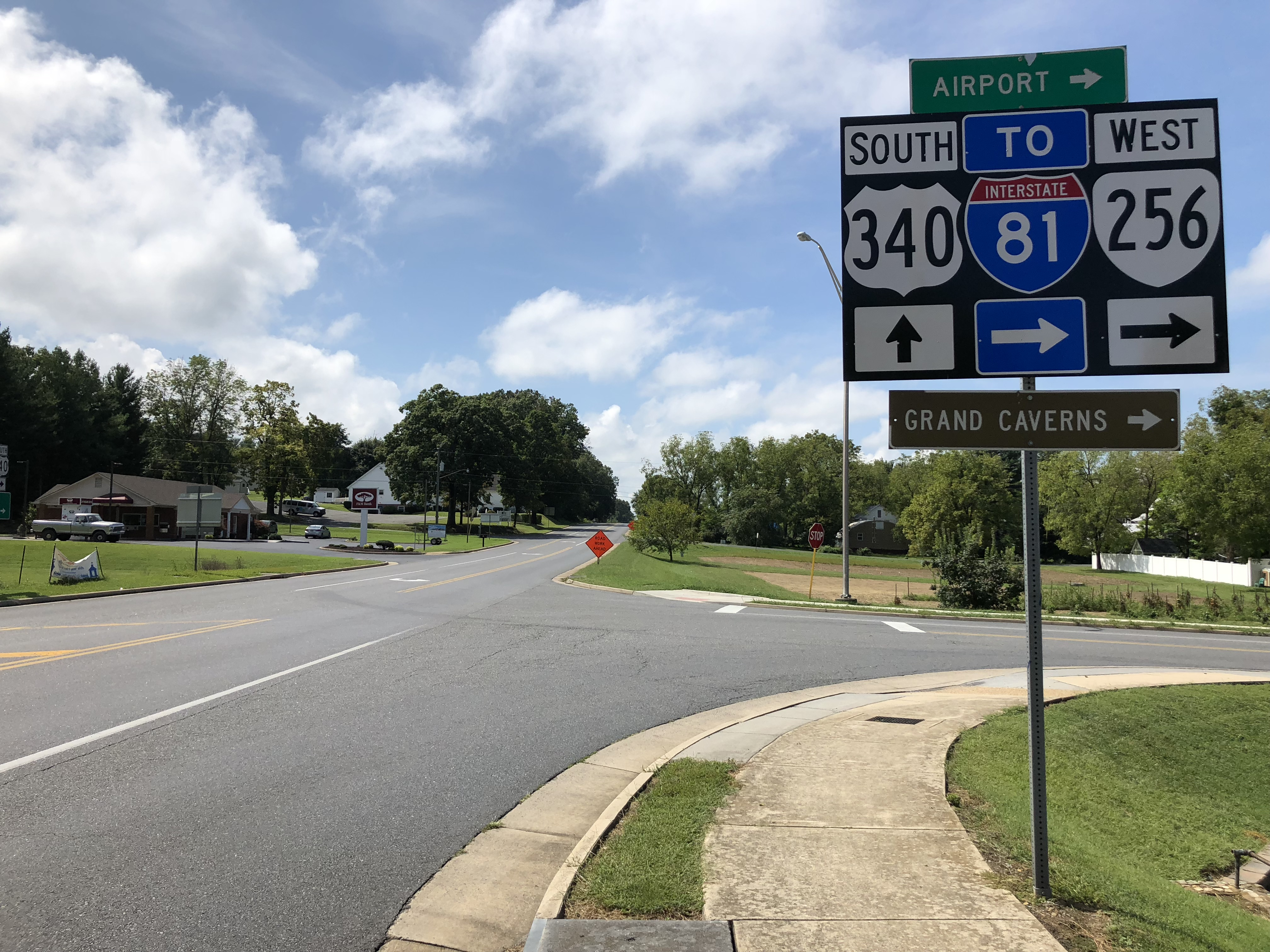
The main road junction in Grottoes, where US 340 and SR 256 meet

== Transportation ==
The main highways providing access to Grottoes are U.S. Route 340 and Virginia State Route 256. US 340 provides north–south access, connecting to Interstate 64 near Waynesboro and U.S. Route 33 near Elkton. SR 256 provides access to and from the west, connecting to Interstate 81 near Weyers Cave.

Previous routes of transport included overland through Brown's Gap to the east, by rail on the Norfolk Southern (formerly the Shenandoah Valley Railroad), or by water on the South Fork to nearby Port Republic and then on the Shenandoah River all the way to Harpers Ferry, WV.

== Demographics ==
Historical population
Census	Pop.	Note	%±
1900	381		—
1910	456		19.7%
1920	492		7.9%
1930	534		8.5%
1940	759		42.1%
1950	908		19.6%
1960	969		6.7%
1970	1,166		20.3%
1980	1,369		17.4%
1990	1,455		6.3%
2000	2,114		45.3%
2010	2,668		26.2%
2020	2,899		8.7%
U.S. Decennial Census

As of the 2020 census there were 2,899 people, 1,283 households, and 1,156 families living in the town. The population density was 1,590.4 people per square mile (614.1 people/km^{2}). There were 1,283 housing units at an average density of 986.9 units per square mile (381.0 units/km^{2}). The racial makeup of the town was 86.16% White, 7.07% Hispanic or Latino, 4.07% African American, 0.20% Native American, 0.27% Asian, 3.27% from other races, and 6.00% identified as two or more races.

There were 1,283 households, out of which 36.2% had children under the age of 18 living with them, 53.2% were married couples living together, 11.4% had a female householder with no husband present, and 31.1% were non-families. 27.2% of all households were made up of individuals, and 11.7% had someone living alone who was 65 years of age or older. The average household size was 2.46 and the average family size was 2.98.

In the town, the population was spread out, with 19.5% under the age of 18, 13.0% from 18 to 24, 24.3% from 25 to 44, 30.3% from 45 to 64, and 12.9% who were 65 years of age or older. The median age was 38. In the town, 54.48% identified female and 45.51% identified male.

The median household income is $78,750. Among families with a single householder present, males had a median income of $95,625 versus $40,679 for females. The per capita income for the town was $29,984. About 11.6% of the population were below the poverty line, and of 21.9% of those people were under 18 years old.

== Notable people ==
- Daryl Irvine – former relief pitcher for the Boston Red Sox
- Dell Curry – former NBA player for the Charlotte Hornets
