= Augusta County, Virginia =

County in Virginia, United States

- County
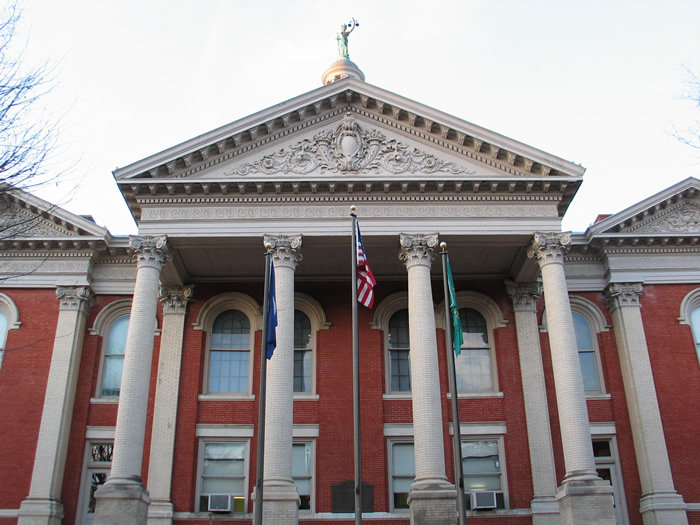
- The Augusta County Courthouse in Verona

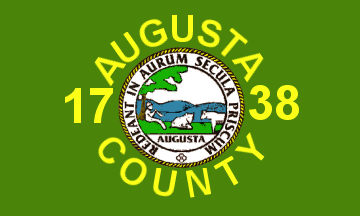
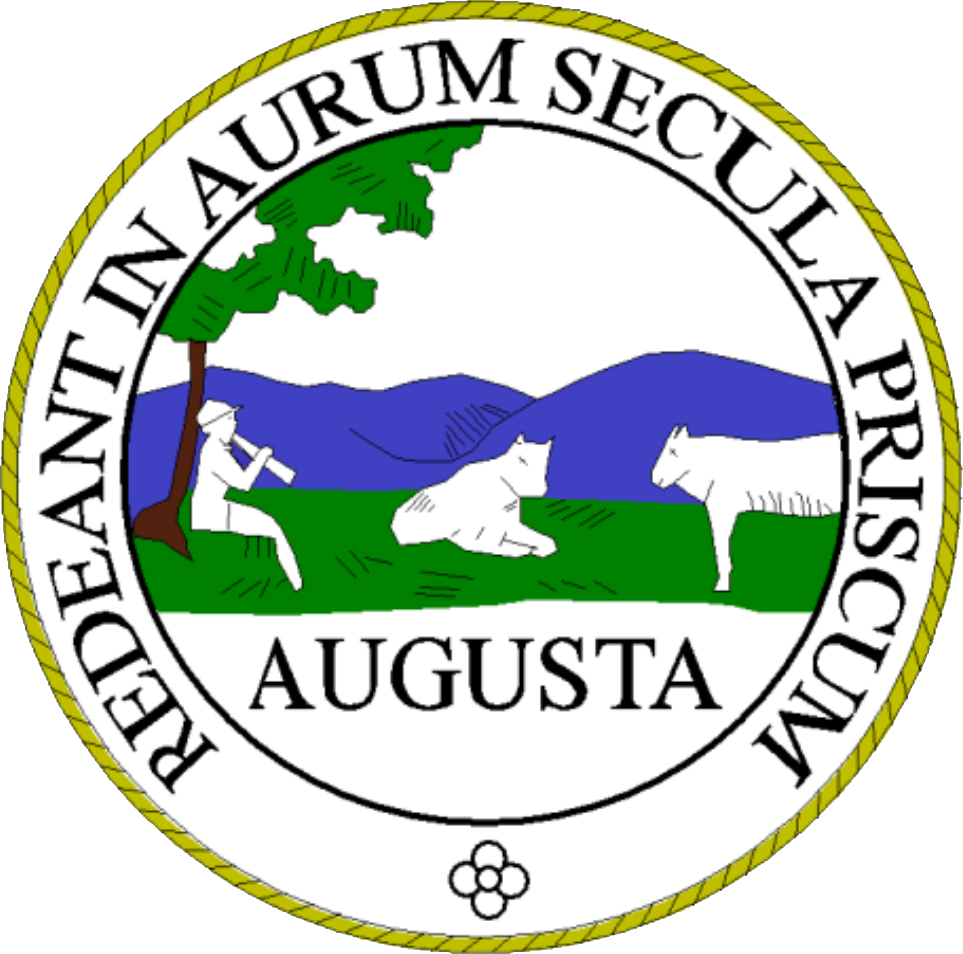
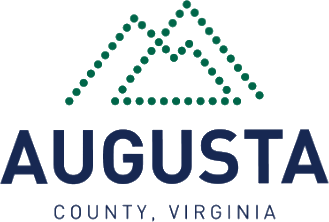
- Flag Seal Logo

- Location within the U.S. state of Virginia
- Coordinates: 38°12′N 79°06′W
- Country: United States
- State: Virginia
- Founded: 1738
- Named for: Princess Augusta of Saxe-Gotha
- Seat: Staunton (independent city)^{1} (de jure); Verona (de facto)
- Largest community: Stuarts Draft

Area
  - Total: 971 sq mi (2,510 km^{2})
  - Land: 967 sq mi (2,500 km^{2})
  - Water: 3.9 sq mi (10 km^{2}) 0.4%

Population (2020)
  - Total: 77,487
  - Estimate (2025): 78,940 ▲
  - Density: 80.1/sq mi (30.9/km^{2})
- Time zone: UTC−5 (Eastern)
  - Summer (DST): UTC−4 (EDT)
- Congressional district: 6th
- Website: www.co.augusta.va.us

Augusta County is a county in the Shenandoah Valley on the western edge of the Commonwealth of Virginia in the United States. The second-largest county of Virginia by total area, it completely surrounds the independent cities of Staunton and Waynesboro. Its county seat is Staunton, though county offices are located in Verona.

The county was created in 1738 from part of Orange County and was named after Princess Augusta of Saxe-Gotha. It was originally a huge area, but many of its parts were carved out to form other counties and several states until the current borders were finalized in 1790.

As of the 2020 census, the county's population was 77,487. Along with Staunton and Waynesboro, it forms the Staunton–Waynesboro, VA Metropolitan Statistical Area.

== History ==
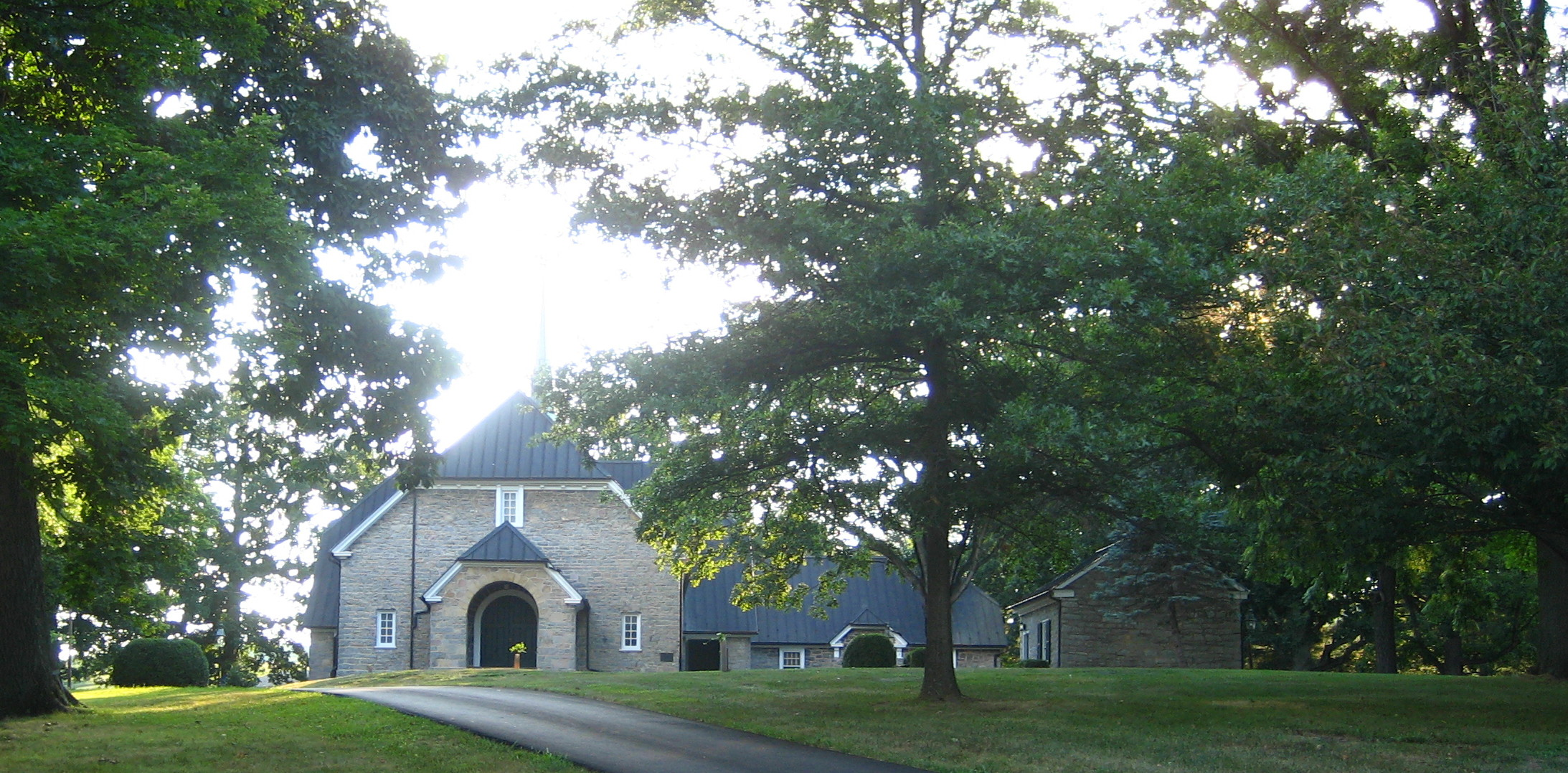
Augusta Stone Church built in 1749

Augusta County was formed in 1738 from Orange County, although, because few people lived there, the county government was not organized until 1745. It was named for Augusta of Saxe-Gotha, Princess of Wales and mother of the future King George III of the United Kingdom.

Originally, Augusta County was a vast territory with an indefinite western boundary. Most of what is now West Virginia as well as the whole of Kentucky were within its early bounds. Additionally, the territory north and west of those areas, theoretically all the way to the Pacific Ocean, were as well.

Reductions in its extent began in 1770, when its southern part became Botetourt County. In 1776 part of western Augusta County, an area also known as the District of West Augusta, became Monongalia County, Ohio County, and Yohogania County (abolished in 1786). In 1778 the portion of Augusta County north and west of the Ohio River became Illinois County (abolished in 1784); the northeastern part of what was remained became Rockingham County, and the southwestern part was combined with part of Botetourt County to form Rockbridge County. In 1788 the northern part of the county was combined with part of Hardy County to become Pendleton County. Augusta County assumed its present dimensions in 1790, when its western part was combined with parts of Botetourt County and Greenbrier County to form Bath County.

During the Civil War, Augusta County served as an important agricultural center as part of the "Breadbasket of the Confederacy." The Virginia Central Railroad ran through the county, linking the Shenandoah Valley to the Confederate capital at Richmond. One of the bloodiest engagements fought in the Shenandoah Valley took place on June 5, 1864, at the Battle of Piedmont, a Union victory that allowed the Union Army to occupy Staunton and destroy many of the facilities that supported the Confederate war effort. Augusta County suffered again during General Philip H. Sheridan's "Burning," which destroyed many farms and killed virtually all of the farm animals.

Staunton, the county seat for many years, was incorporated as a city in 1871 and separated from Augusta County in 1902. Staunton remained the county seat until June 15, 2026, when the county seat was changed to Verona due to hazardous building conditions in the Staunton courthouse.

== Geography ==
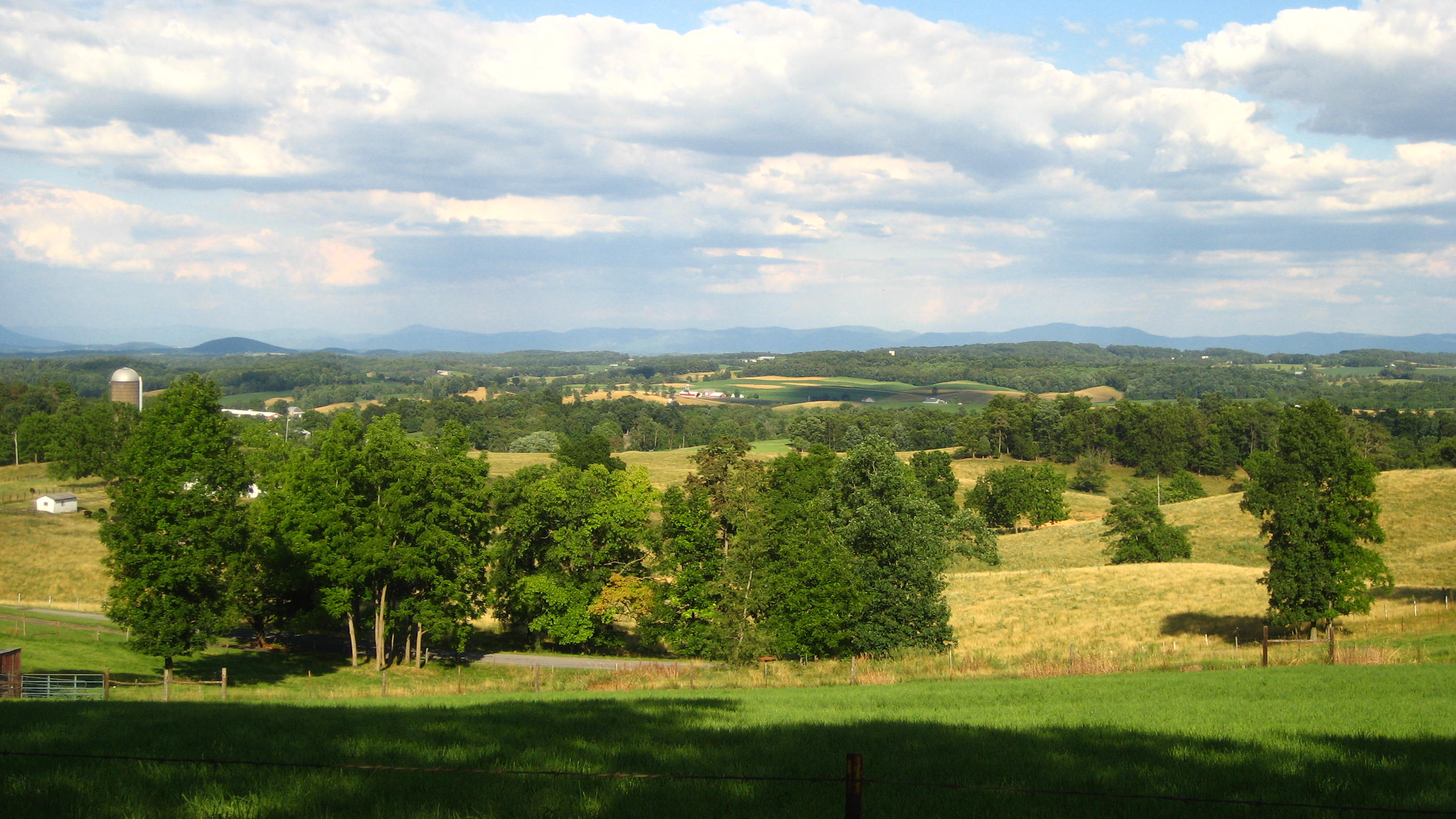
View of Augusta County countryside across the Shenandoah Valley toward the Blue Ridge Mountains

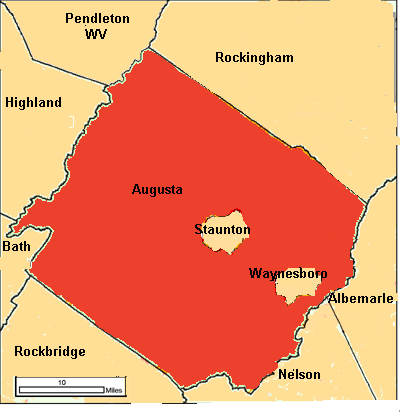
Map of Augusta County and neighboring Counties.

According to the U.S. Census Bureau, the county has a total area of 971 square miles (2,510 km^{2}), of which 967 square miles (2,500 km^{2}) is land and 3.9 square miles (10 km^{2}) (0.4%) is water. It is the third-largest county in Virginia by land area and second-largest by total area.

=== Adjacent counties and independent cities ===
- Staunton (Enclaved)
- Waynesboro (Enclaved)
- Pendleton County, West Virginia (North)
- Rockingham County (Northeast)
- Albemarle County (East)
- Nelson County (Southeast)
- Rockbridge County (Southwest)
- Bath County (West)
- Highland County (Northwest)

=== Districts ===
The county is divided into seven magisterial districts: Beverley Manor, Middle River, North River, Pastures, Riverheads, South River, and Wayne.

=== School systems ===
The county is serviced by Augusta County Public Schools.

=== National protected areas ===
- Blue Ridge Parkway (part)
- George Washington National Forest (part)
- Shenandoah National Park (part)

=== Regional park ===
- Natural Chimneys

=== Major highways ===
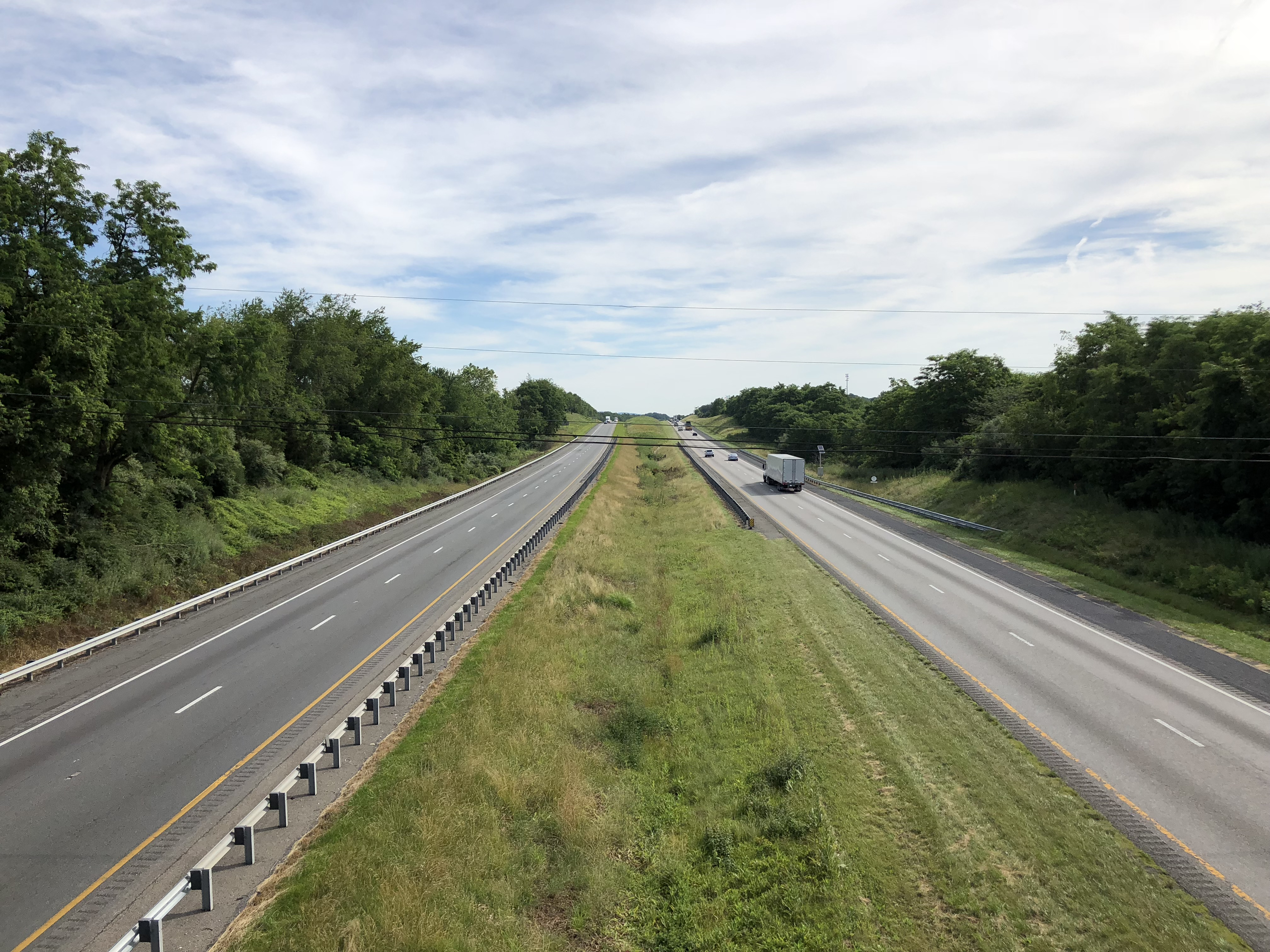
I-64 and I-81 in Augusta County

- I-64
- I-81
- US 11
- US 250
- US 340
- SR 42
- SR 56
- SR 252
- SR 254
- SR 256
- SR 262
- SR 276
- Blue Ridge Parkway

== Demographics ==
Historical population
Census	Pop.	Note	%±
1790	10,886		—
1800	11,712		7.6%
1810	14,308		22.2%
1820	16,742		17.0%
1830	19,926		19.0%
1840	19,628		−1.5%
1850	24,610		25.4%
1860	27,749		12.8%
1870	28,763		3.7%
1880	35,710		24.2%
1890	37,005		3.6%
1900	32,370		−12.5%
1910	32,445		0.2%
1920	34,671		6.9%
1930	38,163		10.1%
1940	42,772		12.1%
1950	34,154		−20.1%
1960	37,363		9.4%
1970	44,220		18.4%
1980	53,732		21.5%
1990	54,677		1.8%
2000	65,615		20.0%
2010	73,750		12.4%
2020	77,487		5.1%
2025 (est.)	78,940	▲	1.9%
U.S. Decennial Census; 1790–1960 1900-1990; 1990–2000 2010 2020

=== Racial and ethnic composition ===
Augusta County, Virginia – Racial and ethnic composition Note: the US Census treats Hispanic/Latino as an ethnic category. This table excludes Latinos from the racial categories and assigns them to a separate category. Hispanics/Latinos may be of any race.
Race / Ethnicity (NH = Non-Hispanic)	Pop 1980	Pop 1990	Pop 2000	Pop 2010	Pop 2020	% 1980	% 1990	% 2000	% 2010	% 2020
White alone (NH)	51,219	52,259	61,970	68,011	68,375	95.32%	95.58%	94.44%	92.22%	88.24%
Black or African American alone (NH)	2,016	1,998	2,354	2,881	3,072	3.75%	3.65%	3.59%	3.91%	3.96%
Native American or Alaska Native alone (NH)	35	46	91	141	130	0.07%	0.08%	0.14%	0.19%	0.17%
Asian alone (NH)	131	130	184	365	461	0.24%	0.24%	0.28%	0.49%	0.59%
Native Hawaiian or Pacific Islander alone (NH)	x	x	11	13	27	x	x	0.02%	0.02%	0.03%
Other race alone (NH)	31	5	38	40	198	0.06%	0.01%	0.06%	0.05%	0.26%
Mixed race or Multiracial (NH)	x	x	347	774	2,496	x	x	0.53%	1.05%	3.22%
Hispanic or Latino (any race)	300	239	620	1,525	2,728	0.56%	0.44%	0.94%	2.07%	3.52%
Total	53,732	54,677	65,615	73,750	77,487	100.00%	100.00%	100.00%	100.00%	100.00%

=== 2020 census ===
As of the 2020 census, the county had a population of 77,487. The median age was 44.9 years. 20.0% of residents were under the age of 18 and 21.4% of residents were 65 years of age or older. For every 100 females there were 101.3 males, and for every 100 females age 18 and over there were 100.8 males age 18 and over.

The racial makeup of the county was 89.2% White, 4.0% Black or African American, 0.2% American Indian and Alaska Native, 0.6% Asian, 0.0% Native Hawaiian and Pacific Islander, 1.4% from some other race, and 4.4% from two or more races. Hispanic or Latino residents of any race comprised 3.5% of the population.

15.7% of residents lived in urban areas, while 84.3% lived in rural areas.

There were 30,233 households in the county, of which 27.6% had children under the age of 18 living with them and 22.6% had a female householder with no spouse or partner present. About 24.0% of all households were made up of individuals and 12.0% had someone living alone who was 65 years of age or older.

There were 32,590 housing units, of which 7.2% were vacant. Among occupied housing units, 78.6% were owner-occupied and 21.4% were renter-occupied. The homeowner vacancy rate was 1.1% and the rental vacancy rate was 4.6%.

=== 2000 Census ===
As of the Census of 2000, there were 65,615 people, 24,818 households, and 18,911 families residing in the county. The population density was 68 people per square mile (26 people/km^{2}). There were 26,738 housing units at an average density of 28 units per square mile (11 units/km^{2}). The racial makeup of the county was 95.02% White, 3.60% Black or African American, 0.15% Native American, 0.28% Asian, 0.02% Pacific Islander, 0.32% from other races, and 0.61% from two or more races. 0.94% of the population were Hispanic or Latino of any race.

There were 24,818 households, of which 33.00% had children under the age of 18 living with them, 63.70% were married couples living together, 8.60% had a female householder with no husband present, and 23.80% were non-families. 20.10% of all households were made up of individuals, and 8.10% had someone living alone who was 65 years of age or older. The average household size was 2.56 and the average family size was 2.94.

In the county, the population was spread out, with 23.70% under the age of 18, 6.90% from 18 to 24, 29.80% from 25 to 44, 26.80% from 45 to 64, and 12.80% who were 65 years of age or older. The median age was 39 years. For every 100 females there were 101.10 males. For every 100 females age 18 and over, there were 99.80 males.

The median income for a household in the county was $43,045, and the median income for a family was $48,579. Males had a median income of $31,577 versus $24,233 for females. The per capita income for the county was $19,744. About 4.20% of families and 5.80% of the population were below the poverty line, including 6.40% of those under age 18 and 6.60% of those age 65 or over.

=== Area populations ===
According to the 2010 US Census data, below are the populations of the two towns and select unincorporated communities within Augusta County:

#	Town	Population
1	Grottoes	2,668
2	Craigsville	923

The majority of Grottoes is located in Rockingham County. Only seven of the town's 2,668 residents reside in Augusta County.

#	Unincorporated Community	Population
1	Stuarts Draft	9,235
2	Fishersville	7,462
3	Verona	4,239
4	Weyers Cave	2,473
5	Crimora	2,209
6	Lyndhurst	1,490
7	Dooms	1,327
8	Swoope	1,323
9	Jolivue	1,129
10	Greenville	832
11	Fort Defiance	780
12	Sherando	688
13	Mount Sidney	663
14	Churchville	194

== Government ==
=== Board of Supervisors ===
- Beverley Manor district: Butch Wells (R)
- Middle River district: Gerald W. Garber (R)
- North River district: Jeffrey “Jeff” Slaven (R)
- Pastures district: Pam L. Carter (R)
- Riverheads district: Michael L. Shull (R)
- South River district: Carolyn Bragg (R)
- Wayne district: Scott Seaton (R)

=== Constitutional Officers ===
- Clerk of the Circuit Court: Steve Landes (R)
- Commissioner of the Revenue: George Price (R)
- Commonwealth's Attorney: Tim Martin (R)
- Sheriff: Donald L. Smith (I) (Elected as Independent but Republican)
- Treasurer: David Bourne (R)

=== State and Federal ===
Augusta County is represented by Republican Mark Obenshain and Chris Head in the Virginia Senate, Republican Ellen Campbell and Republican Chris Runion in the Virginia House of Delegates, and Republican Ben Cline in the U.S. House of Representatives.

United States presidential election results for Augusta County, Virginia
Year	Republican		Democratic		Third party(ies)	
Year	No.	%	No.	%	No.	%
1912	568	22.90%	1,556	62.74%	356	14.35%
1916	845	31.96%	1,751	66.23%	48	1.82%
1920	1,707	44.01%	2,106	54.29%	66	1.70%
1924	1,265	38.74%	1,920	58.81%	80	2.45%
1928	2,679	64.00%	1,507	36.00%	0	0.00%
1932	1,541	36.37%	2,606	61.51%	90	2.12%
1936	1,668	36.49%	2,872	62.83%	31	0.68%
1940	1,768	38.74%	2,774	60.78%	22	0.48%
1944	2,319	44.20%	2,913	55.52%	15	0.29%
1948	1,690	48.93%	1,355	39.23%	409	11.84%
1952	3,414	69.97%	1,453	29.78%	12	0.25%
1956	3,466	68.07%	1,484	29.14%	142	2.79%
1960	4,034	67.36%	1,914	31.96%	41	0.68%
1964	4,327	51.68%	4,039	48.24%	6	0.07%
1968	6,313	57.92%	2,028	18.61%	2,559	23.48%
1972	9,106	81.44%	1,766	15.79%	309	2.76%
1976	8,452	57.53%	5,626	38.29%	614	4.18%
1980	11,011	64.32%	5,202	30.39%	907	5.30%
1984	15,308	79.22%	3,899	20.18%	116	0.60%
1988	13,251	75.14%	4,170	23.65%	213	1.21%
1992	12,896	58.98%	5,190	23.74%	3,780	17.29%
1996	13,458	60.89%	5,965	26.99%	2,679	12.12%
2000	17,744	70.21%	6,643	26.29%	884	3.50%
2004	22,100	74.40%	7,019	23.63%	585	1.97%
2008	23,120	69.35%	9,825	29.47%	393	1.18%
2012	23,624	70.16%	9,451	28.07%	597	1.77%
2016	26,163	71.99%	8,177	22.50%	2,003	5.51%
2020	30,714	72.65%	10,840	25.64%	724	1.71%
2024	32,429	73.01%	11,403	25.67%	585	1.32%

=== Law enforcement ===
The Augusta County Sheriff's Office is the primary law enforcement agency in Augusta County. The ACSO was created in 1745 when James Patton was elected as the first sheriff. The ACSO was accredited by the Virginia Law Enforcement Accreditation Coalition. The agency is currently headed by Sheriff Donald Smith. The ACSO currently has 72 sworn deputies and 6 dispatchers.

In 2021, the sheriff's department arrested eight individuals for protesting outside the Sheriff's Office. In response to the shooting of two men by deputies earlier that year, the protestors wanted deputies to use body cameras. Most of the charges were thrown out by a judge in 2022. Body cameras were not included in the 2022 budget: initially the county board of supervisors instead created a fund for body cameras that the community could donate to, but they shortly rescinded that decision over a desire to avoid contributions to the fund by the protesting group.

== Economy ==
According to the county's 2023 Comprehensive Annual Financial Report, the top employers in the county are:

#	Employer	# of Employees
1	Augusta County Public Schools	1,000+
2	Augusta Medical Center	1,000+
3	Hershey	1,000+
4	Target	500-999
5	McKee Foods	1,000+
6	AAF-McQuay	500-999
7	Hollister Co.	500-999
8	County of Augusta	500-999
9	NIBCO of Virginia	250-499
10	University Instructors Inc	250-499

== Communities ==
The independent cities of Staunton and Waynesboro (incorporated as such in 1902 and 1948 respectively) are located within the boundaries of Augusta County, but are not a part of the county.

=== Towns ===
- Craigsville
- Grottoes (partial)

=== Census-designated places ===
- Augusta Springs
- Churchville
- Crimora
- Deerfield
- Dooms
- Fishersville
- Greenville
- Harriston
- Jolivue
- Lyndhurst
- Middlebrook
- Mount Sidney
- New Hope
- Sherando
- Stuarts Draft
- Verona
- Weyers Cave
- Wintergreen (mostly in Nelson County)

=== Other unincorporated communities ===
- Fort Defiance
- Love
- Mint Spring
- Mount Solon
- Spring Hill
- Steeles Tavern
- Swoope
- West Augusta

== Notable people ==
- Thomas Adams, born in Augusta County, member of the Virginia House of Burgesses and signer of the Articles of Confederation
- Robert Allen, born in Augusta County, United States Congressman from Tennessee
- George Caleb Bingham (1811–1879), born in Augusta County, noted painter and State Treasurer of Missouri
- Gideon Blackburn (1772–1838), born in Augusta County, noted clergyman and founder of Blackburn College
- John Brown, lawyer and statesman
- Samuel Brown, born in Augusta County, noted surgeon and editor
- Laurie Buckhout, born and raised in Augusta County, military officer
- John Wilson Campbell, born in Augusta County, United States Congressman from Ohio
- William Campbell, born in Augusta County, militia leader in the American Revolutionary War
- John Colter (c.1774–May 7, 1812(?)), born near Stuarts Draft, was a member of the Lewis and Clark Expedition (1804–1806); best remembered for his 1807–1808 explorations as the first person of European descent to enter the region now known as Yellowstone National Park and the Grand Tetons
- Samuel Doak, (1749–1830), born in Augusta County, noted Presbyterian clergyman, founder of Washington College, the first college west of the Alleghenies, noted abolitionist
- Ida Stover Eisenhower (1862–1946), mother of President Dwight D. Eisenhower, was born in Mount Sidney, Augusta County
- John H. Fulton, (died 1836), born in Augusta County, United States Congressman from Virginia
- John P. Gaines, (1795–1857), born in Augusta County, United States Congressman from Kentucky and governor of the Oregon Territory.
- John D. Imboden, (1823–1895), born in Augusta County, member of the Virginia General Assembly, Confederate Army cavalry general and partisan fighter in the American Civil War.
- John Lewis (1678–1762), opened up what is now Augusta County to settlement.
- Thomas Lewis, Jr., born in Augusta County, United States Congressman from Virginia.
- William J. Lewis, (1766–1828), born in Augusta County, United States Congressman from Virginia.
- Robert D. Lilley, (1836–1886), born in Greenville, Augusta County, Confederate Army general in the American Civil War.
- Benjamin Logan, (c.1742–1803), born in Augusta County, United States Congressman from Kentucky.
- George Mathews, (1739–1812), born in Augusta County, United States Congressman and Governor of Georgia. Member of the Mathews family.
- Sampson Mathews, (c. 1737–1806), born in Augusta County, Virginia State Senator and Revolutionary War officer. Member of the Mathews family.
- Robert McKnight (c.1789–1846), born in Augusta County, moved to St. Louis, Missouri, in 1809, member of a trading expedition under Zebulon Pike to Santa Fe, New Mexico, in 1812, captured by Spanish and imprisoned until 1821, eventually renounced his United States citizenship, moved to Mexico, and became owner of the Santa Rita del Cobre copper mine in Chihuahua (now New Mexico).
- Thomas McKnight, businessman and member of Wisconsin Territorial Council
- James Patton (1692-1755), Irish immigrant who served as Justice of the Peace, Colonel of Militia and Chief Commander of the Augusta County Militia, County Lieutenant, President of the Augusta Court, county coroner, county escheator, and County Sheriff.
- Joel F. Salatin (b. 1957), founder, owner and manager of Polyface Farm in Swoope, Virginia.
- Kate Smith (May 1, 1907 – June 17, 1986) born in Augusta County, Greenville, VA. An American contralto.[1][2][3][4] Referred to as The First Lady of Radio, Smith is well known for her renditions of "God Bless America" and "When the Moon Comes over the Mountain".
- Thomas Woodrow Wilson (December 28, 1856 – February 3, 1924) 28th President of the United States of America, 34th Governor of New Jersey, and 13th President of Princeton University located in Princeton, New Jersey.

== See also ==
- Augusta County Sheriff's Office
- National Register of Historic Places listings in Augusta County, Virginia
