= National Register of Historic Places listings in Augusta County, Virginia =

Location of Augusta County in Virginia

This is a list of the National Register of Historic Places listings in Augusta County, Virginia.

This is intended to be a complete list of the properties and districts on the National Register of Historic Places in Augusta County, Virginia, United States. The locations of National Register properties and districts with available latitude and longitude coordinates may be viewed on an online map.

There are 61 properties and districts listed on the National Register in the county, including 2 National Historic Landmarks.

This National Park Service list is complete through NPS recent listings posted May 1, 2026.

== Current listings ==
	Name on the Register	Image	Date listed	Location	City or town	Description
1	James Alexander House	James Alexander House	September 16, 1982 (#82004543)	North of Spottswood on Almo Chapel Rd. 37°57′53″N 79°12′12″W	Spottswood	
2	Archeological Site No. AU-154	Archeological Site No. AU-154	December 13, 1985 (#85003171)	Paine Run Hollow Rd. at the mouth of Paine Run Hollow; 38°11′56″N 78°47′44″W	Grottoes	
3	Augusta County Training School	Augusta County Training School	June 19, 1986 (#86001400)	Cedar Green Rd. 38°08′49″N 79°07′54″W	Cedar Green	
4	Augusta Military Academy	Augusta Military Academy	February 10, 1983 (#83003258)	North of Staunton on U.S. Route 11; 38°14′16″N 78°58′39″W	Fort Defiance	
5	Augusta Stone Church	Augusta Stone Church	May 9, 1973 (#73001994)	U.S. Route 11; 38°14′18″N 78°58′32″W	Fort Defiance	
6	Bare House and Mill	Bare House and Mill	November 21, 2002 (#02001364)	157 Wilda Rd. 38°01′23″N 79°05′42″W	Stuarts Draft	
7	Bethel Green	Bethel Green	August 26, 1982 (#82004539)	Howardsville Rd. 38°02′32″N 79°10′33″W	Greenville	
8	Black Oak Spring		August 17, 2023 (#100009242)	1709 Dam Town Rd. 38°12′05″N 78°54′59″W	Fort Defiance vicinity	
9	Blackrock Springs Site	Blackrock Springs Site	December 13, 1985 (#85003169)	Source of Paine Run; 38°12′30″N 78°45′09″W	Grottoes	
10	Blue Ridge Parkway	Blue Ridge Parkway	December 13, 2024 (#100011353)	Blue Ridge Parkway through Virginia and North Carolina; 38°01′51″N 78°51′28″W	Afton vicinity	
11	Blue Ridge Tunnel	Blue Ridge Tunnel	April 25, 2023 (#100008324)	215 Afton Depot Ln. 38°02′18″N 78°51′45″W	Afton vicinity	
12	Chapel Hill	Chapel Hill	November 16, 1978 (#78003006)	East of Mint Spring on White Hill Rd. 38°03′56″N 79°04′17″W	Mint Spring	
13	Clover Mount	Clover Mount	September 16, 1982 (#82004540)	West of Greenville on Pilson Rd. 37°59′59″N 79°12′23″W	Greenville	
14	Coiner House	Coiner House	March 30, 1978 (#78003005)	Northwest of Crimora off Rockfish Rd. 38°10′00″N 78°51′54″W	Crimora	
15	Craigsville School	Craigsville School	February 27, 1985 (#85000383)	Railroad Ave. 38°04′46″N 79°22′47″W	Craigsville	
16	Crimora School	Crimora School	February 27, 1985 (#85000384)	New Hope-Crimora Rd. 38°09′18″N 78°51′09″W	Crimora	
17	Deerfield School	Deerfield School	June 19, 1986 (#86001402)	Marble Valley Rd. 38°11′41″N 79°24′22″W	Deerfield	
18	Dutch Hollow Hanger Cemetery	Dutch Hollow Hanger Cemetery	March 6, 2024 (#100010042)	911 Wagon Shop Road; 38°00′27″N 79°13′58″W	Middlebrook	
19	Estaline Schoolhouse	Estaline Schoolhouse	February 27, 1985 (#85000385)	Estaline Valley Rd. 38°03′46″N 79°21′26″W	Estaline Valley	
20	Folly	Folly	October 25, 1973 (#73001995)	South of Staunton on U.S. Route 11; 38°05′26″N 79°05′41″W	Staunton	
21	Glebe Burying Ground	Glebe Burying Ground	October 1, 1985 (#85002722)	South of Swoope on Glebe School Rd. 38°06′34″N 79°13′20″W	Swoope	
22	Glebe Schoolhouse	Glebe Schoolhouse	February 27, 1985 (#85000386)	Glebe School Rd. 38°06′37″N 79°13′15″W	Summerdean	
23	Greenwood-Afton Rural Historic District	Greenwood-Afton Rural Historic District	May 6, 2011 (#11000258)	Roughly 5 miles (8.0 km) to 7 miles (11 km) north and south of Interstate 64; 38°01′42″N 78°52′09″W	Greenwood	Boundaries modified on February 8, 2016. Extends into Albemarle and Nelson counties
24	Hanger Mill	Hanger Mill	November 8, 1991 (#91001596)	Junction of U.S. Route 250 and Hangers Mill Rd. 38°13′10″N 79°08′09″W	Churchville	
25	Harnsberger Octagonal Barn	Harnsberger Octagonal Barn	July 8, 1982 (#82004541)	Snowflake Mill Rd. 38°15′44″N 78°51′50″W	Grottoes	
26	Harper House	Harper House	February 1, 2006 (#05001623)	3029 U.S. Route 340; 38°02′25″N 79°01′10″W	Stuarts Draft	
27	Intervale	Intervale	February 14, 1985 (#85000296)	Morris Mill Rd. 38°11′52″N 79°11′20″W	Swoope	
28	Long Glade Farm	Long Glade Farm	January 22, 1996 (#95001560)	Mt. Solon Rd., south of the junction with Old Quarry Rd. 38°16′54″N 79°04′22″W	Mount Solon	
29	Long Meadow		October 26, 2023 (#100009530)	464 Long Meadow Road; 38°06′45″N 78°57′39″W	Fishersville	
30	Maple Front Farm	Maple Front Farm	August 16, 2010 (#10000562)	439 Cale Spring Rd. 38°03′33″N 79°14′28″W	Middlebrook	
31	Middlebrook High School	Middlebrook High School	February 27, 1985 (#85000387)	Cherry Grove Rd. 38°03′01″N 79°12′45″W	Middlebrook	
32	Middlebrook Historic District	Middlebrook Historic District	February 10, 1983 (#83003259)	Junction of State Route 252 and Mish Barn Rd. 38°03′06″N 79°12′48″W	Middlebrook	
33	Middlebrook School	Middlebrook School	February 27, 1985 (#85000388)	Cherry Grove Rd. 38°03′02″N 79°12′44″W	Middlebrook	
34	A. J. Miller House	A. J. Miller House	July 8, 1982 (#82004542)	Sinking Springs Rd. 38°01′25″N 79°13′56″W	Middlebrook	
35	Hannah Miller House	Hannah Miller House	May 24, 1979 (#79003028)	North of Mossy Creek off Mossy Creek Rd. 38°21′34″N 79°01′46″W	Mossy Creek	
36	Henry Miller House	Henry Miller House	May 23, 1979 (#79003029)	East of Mossy Creek on State Route 42; 38°21′27″N 79°01′40″W	Mossy Creek	
37	Mint Spring Tavern	Mint Spring Tavern	May 19, 2025 (#100011862)	1893 Lee Jackson Highway; 38°04′14″N 79°06′15″W	Staunton vicinity	
38	Henry Mish Barn	Henry Mish Barn	February 10, 1983 (#83003260)	North of Middlebrook on Mish Barn Rd. 38°03′54″N 79°13′30″W	Middlebrook	
39	Moffett's Creek Schoolhouse	Moffett's Creek Schoolhouse	February 27, 1985 (#85000389)	Mt. Hermon Rd. 38°00′10″N 79°18′27″W	Newport	
40	Mt. Airy	Mt. Airy	August 22, 2012 (#12000538)	Access road off Technology Dr., southeast of the Augusta County Government Center; 38°11′22″N 79°00′44″W	Verona	home of American folk artist Grandma Moses
41	Mt. Meridian Schoolhouse	Mt. Meridian Schoolhouse	February 27, 1985 (#85000390)	Rockfish Rd. 38°15′35″N 78°51′38″W	Mt. Meridian	
42	Mount Pleasant	Mount Pleasant	October 30, 1989 (#89001792)	879 Middle River Rd. 38°14′36″N 79°05′10″W	Staunton	
43	Mt. Sidney Historic District	Mt. Sidney Historic District	October 30, 1998 (#98001313)	U.S. Route 11, Mt. Sidney School Ln., and Pottery Shop Ln. 38°15′22″N 78°57′36″W	Mt. Sidney	
44	Mt. Sidney School	Mt. Sidney School	February 27, 1985 (#85000391)	U.S. Route 11; 38°15′22″N 78°57′43″W	Mt. Sidney	
45	Mt. Torry Furnace	Mt. Torry Furnace	February 25, 1974 (#74002231)	Southwest of Waynesboro on Mt. Torry Rd. in the George Washington National Forest; 37°56′43″N 78°57′53″W	Sherando	
46	Mt. Zion Schoolhouse	Mt. Zion Schoolhouse	February 27, 1985 (#85000392)	Freemason Run Rd. 38°20′13″N 79°07′36″W	Mount Solon	
47	New Hope High School	New Hope High School	February 27, 1985 (#85000393)	Battlefield Rd. 38°12′04″N 78°54′14″W	New Hope	
48	North River High School	North River High School	February 27, 1985 (#85000394)	State Route 42; 38°18′54″N 79°04′45″W	Moscow	
49	Old Providence Stone Church	Old Providence Stone Church	December 5, 1972 (#72001383)	Junction of Spottswood and Old Providence Rds. 37°57′40″N 79°13′35″W	Spottswood	
50	Paine Run Rockshelter	Paine Run Rockshelter	December 13, 1985 (#85003170)	Southern side of Paine Run Hollow; 38°11′54″N 78°47′34″W	Grottoes	
51	Lewis Shuey House	Lewis Shuey House	February 10, 1983 (#83003261)	South of Swoope on Shuey Rd. 38°07′07″N 79°13′38″W	Swoope	
52	Skyline Drive Historic District	Skyline Drive Historic District	April 28, 1997 (#97000375)	Shenandoah National Park, from the northern entrance station at Front Royal to the southern entrance station at the Rockfish Gap; 38°08′32″N 78°46′48″W	Luray	
53	Sugar Loaf Farm	Sugar Loaf Farm	July 9, 1991 (#91000884)	West of the junction of Sugar Loaf and Eidson Creek Rds. 38°06′09″N 79°10′25″W	Staunton	
54	Swannanoa	Swannanoa	October 1, 1969 (#69000221)	South of the junction of U.S. Route 250 and the Howardsville Turnpike; 38°01′41″N 78°52′08″W	Waynesboro	Extends into Nelson County
55	Fannie Thompson House	Fannie Thompson House	May 11, 2018 (#100002438)	7 Old Staunton Rd. 38°00′20″N 79°09′19″W	Greenville	
56	Tinkling Spring Presbyterian Church	Tinkling Spring Presbyterian Church	April 11, 1973 (#73001993)	Tinkling Spring Rd. south of its junction with Lifecore Dr. 38°05′06″N 78°58′57″W	Fishersville	
57	Valley Railroad Stone Bridge	Valley Railroad Stone Bridge	November 19, 1974 (#74002105)	South of Jolivue off U.S. Route 11; 38°05′22″N 79°04′40″W	Jolivue	
58	Verona School	Verona School	February 27, 1985 (#85000395)	U.S. Route 11; 38°12′15″N 79°00′26″W	Verona	
59	Walker's Creek Schoolhouse	Walker's Creek Schoolhouse	February 27, 1985 (#85000396)	Walker Creek Rd. 38°00′57″N 79°19′53″W	Newport	
60	West View Schoolhouse	West View Schoolhouse	February 27, 1985 (#85000397)	Broad Run and Westview School Rds. 38°16′04″N 78°54′54″W	Weyers Cave	
61	Weyers Cave School	Weyers Cave School	February 27, 1985 (#85000398)	State Route 276; 38°17′18″N 78°54′32″W	Weyers Cave	

== See also ==
- List of National Historic Landmarks in Virginia
- National Register of Historic Places listings in Virginia
- National Register of Historic Places listings in Staunton, Virginia
- National Register of Historic Places listings in Waynesboro, Virginia
