= Sugar Loaf Farm =

Historic site in Virginia, US

- U.S. National Register of Historic Places
- Virginia Landmarks Register
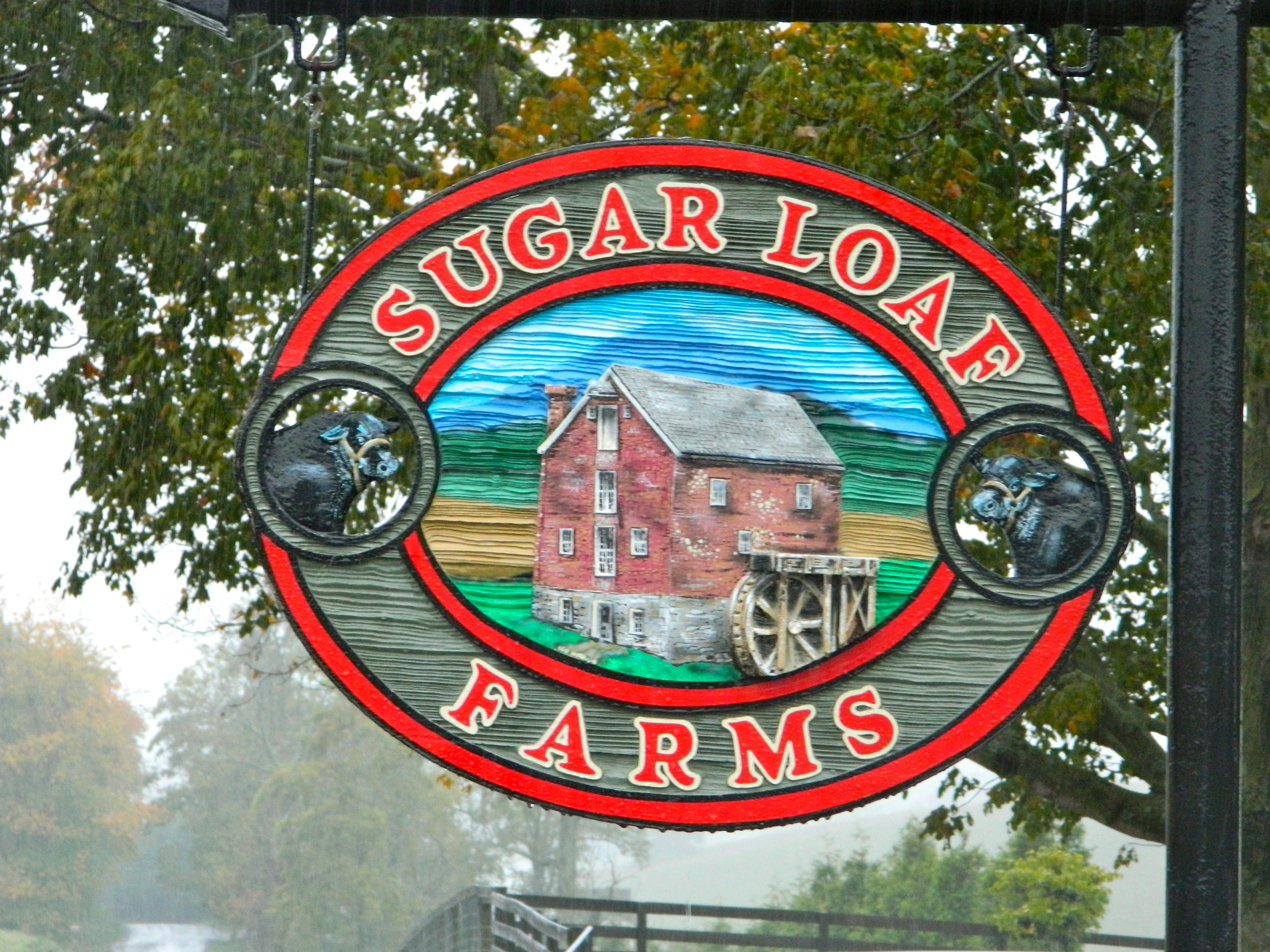
- Sugar Loaf Farm logo

- Location within Virginia Location within the United States
- Location: Augusta County Virginia, USA
- Nearest city: Staunton, Virginia
- Coordinates: 38°6′10″N 078°58′37″W
- Area: 408 acres (165 ha)
- Built: 1822
- Architectural style: Federal
- NRHP reference No.: 91000884
- VLR No.: 007-0032

Significant dates
- Added to NRHP: July 9, 1991
- Designated VLR: April 17, 1991

Sugar Loaf Farm is an early 19th-century cluster of agricultural, industrial, and residential buildings located in a bucolic setting approximately 7.5 miles southwest of Staunton, Virginia and 1/2 mile southeast of Sugar Loaf Mountain. As a member of the U.S. National Register of Historic Places, Sugar Loaf Farm maintains the only surviving brick grist mill in Augusta County, Virginia. The brick grist mill on the property combines the mechanical principles of Oliver Evans, a prominent mill designer of the late eighteenth century, with the engineering craftsmanship and building detail of molded brick cornices, a vernacular architecture in the upper Shenandoah Valley in the early 1800s. The Farm's three original buildings, the farmhouse, grist mill and miller's house, were all constructed by David Summer at a time when Augusta County had emerged as the center of one of the most dominant wheat-growing and flour-processing regions in the South. Sugar Loaf Farm serves as a valuable reminder of the wheat-based agriculture that persisted in this region well into the twentieth century. Today, Sugar Loaf Farm is a privately run farm that specializes in raising Black Angus cattle.

== History ==
Sugar Loaf Farm is named after the distinctive cone-shaped hill on the property that has been a local landmark for centuries. The main portion of Sugar Loaf Farm was owned by John Summers as early as 1773. By 1830, John Summers's son, David, had built the three original buildings—the farmhouse, the grist mill and the miller's house. After David Summer's death in 1857, the farm was purchased by Jacob Bowman and remained in the Bowman family until the twentieth century. Since the Bowman ownership, Sugar Loaf Farm has passed through a variety of owners and is currently owned by a large, privately run cattle operation.

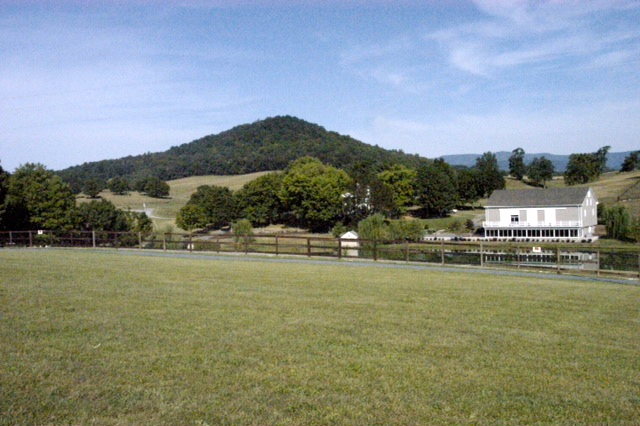
Sugar Loaf mountain

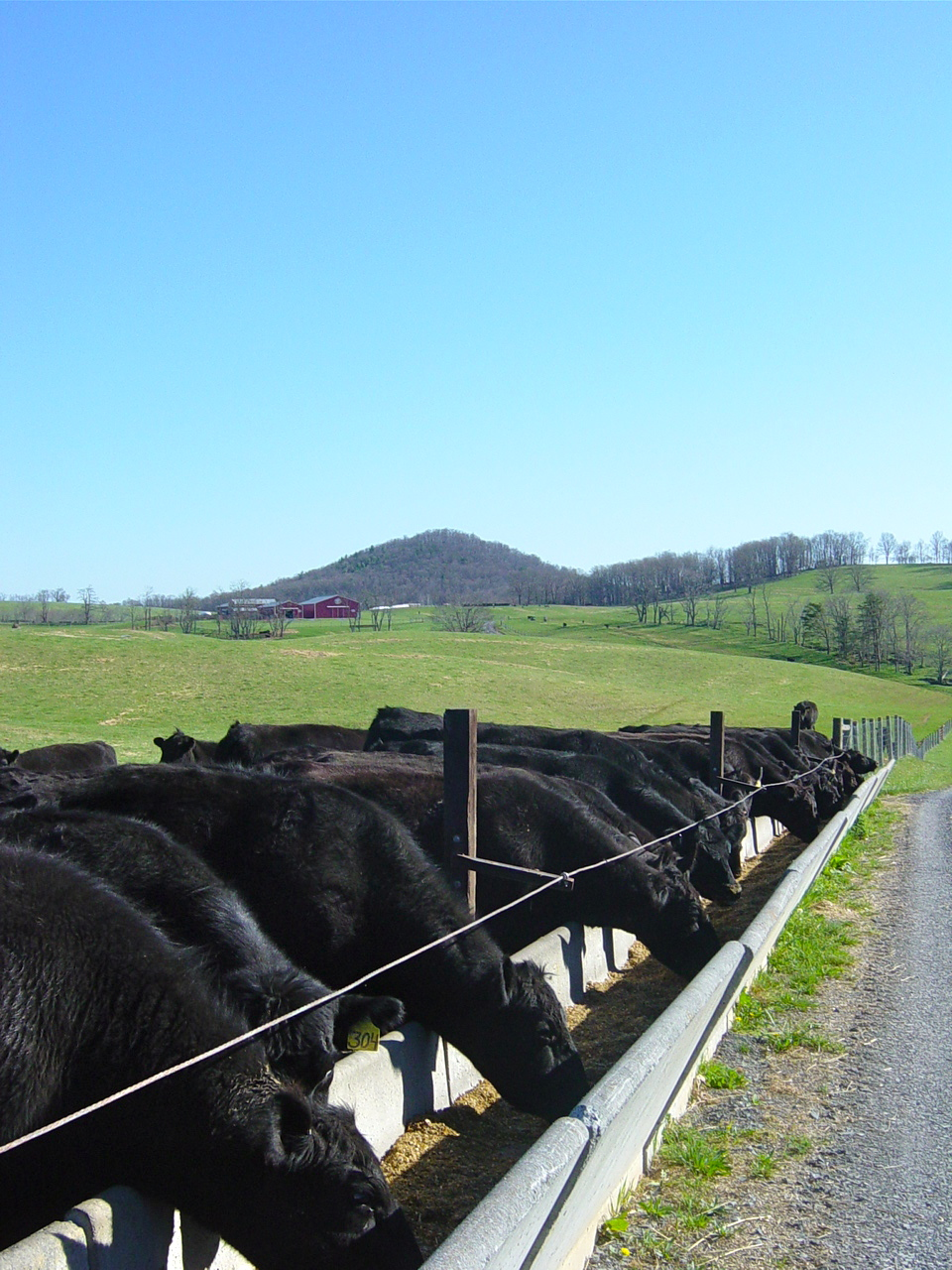
Black Angus Cattle

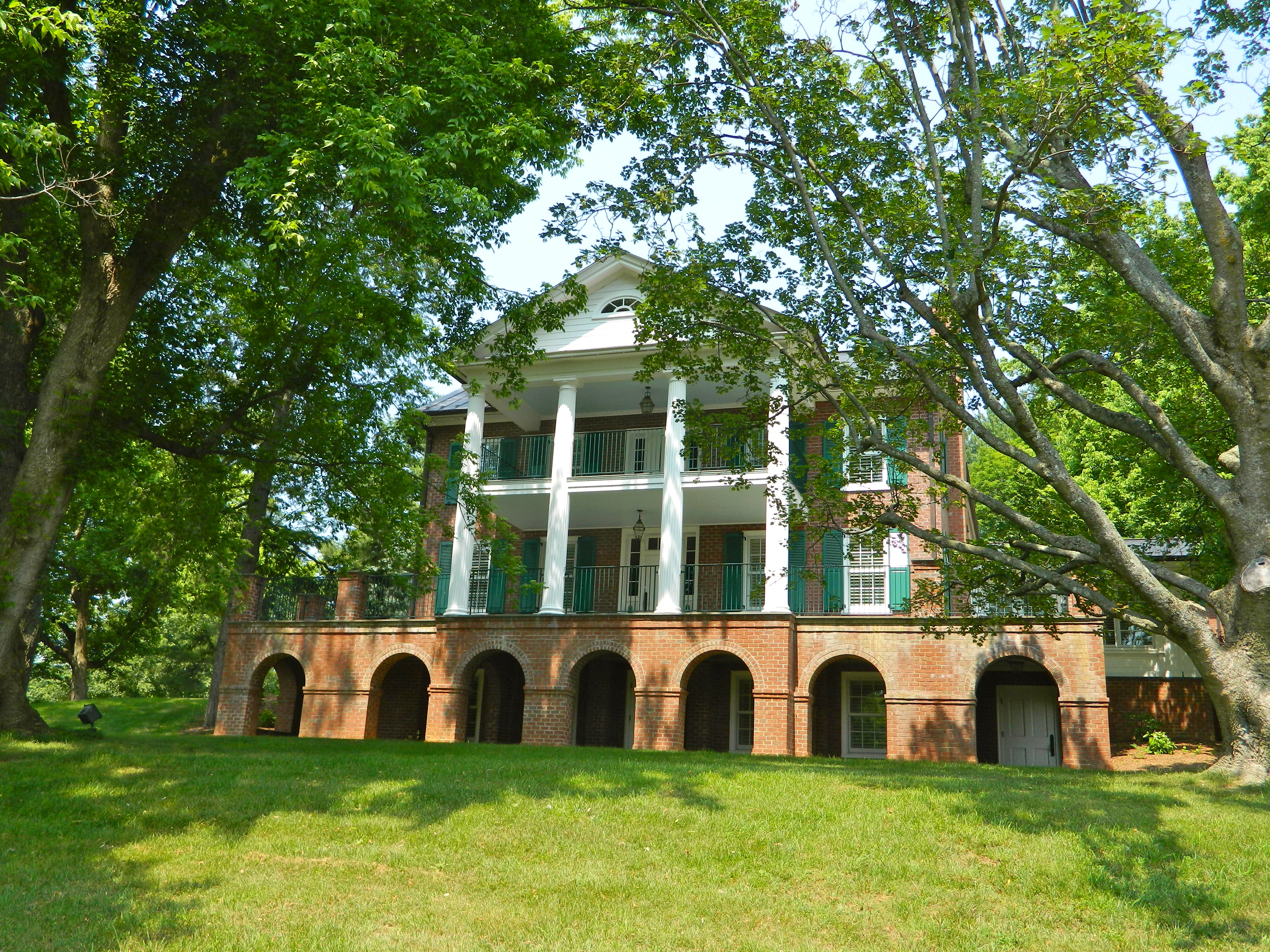

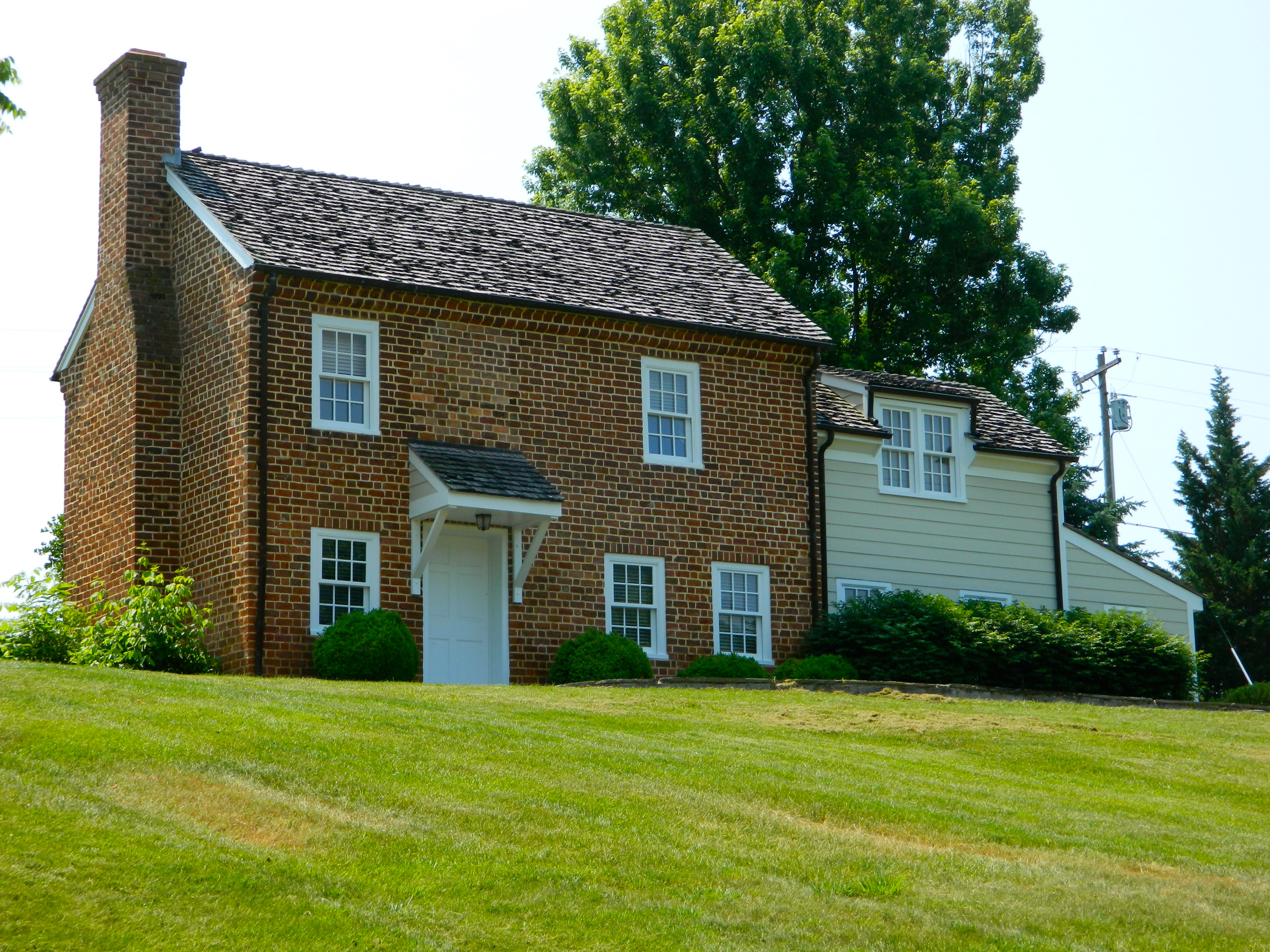

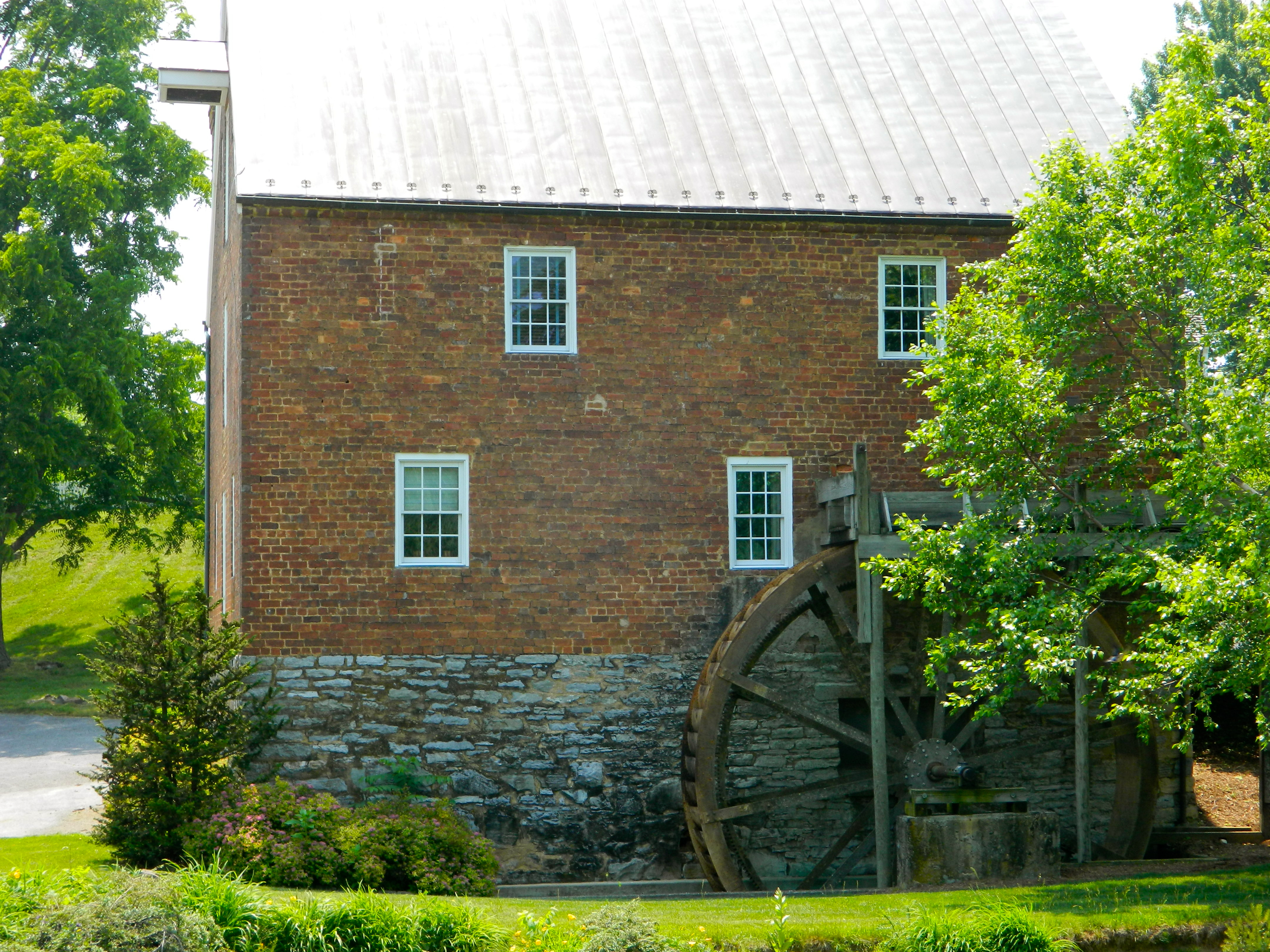
Sugar Loaf Farm

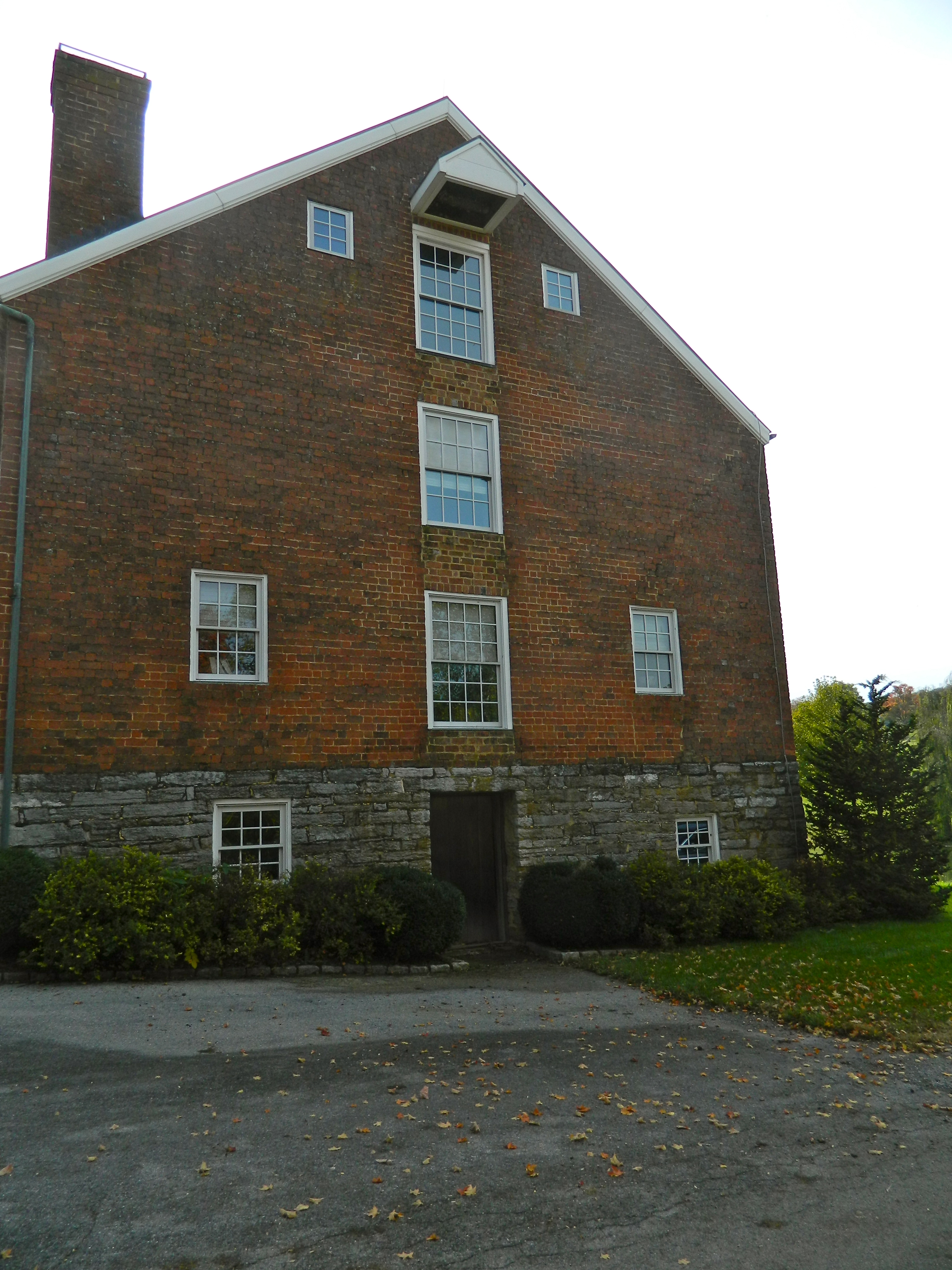

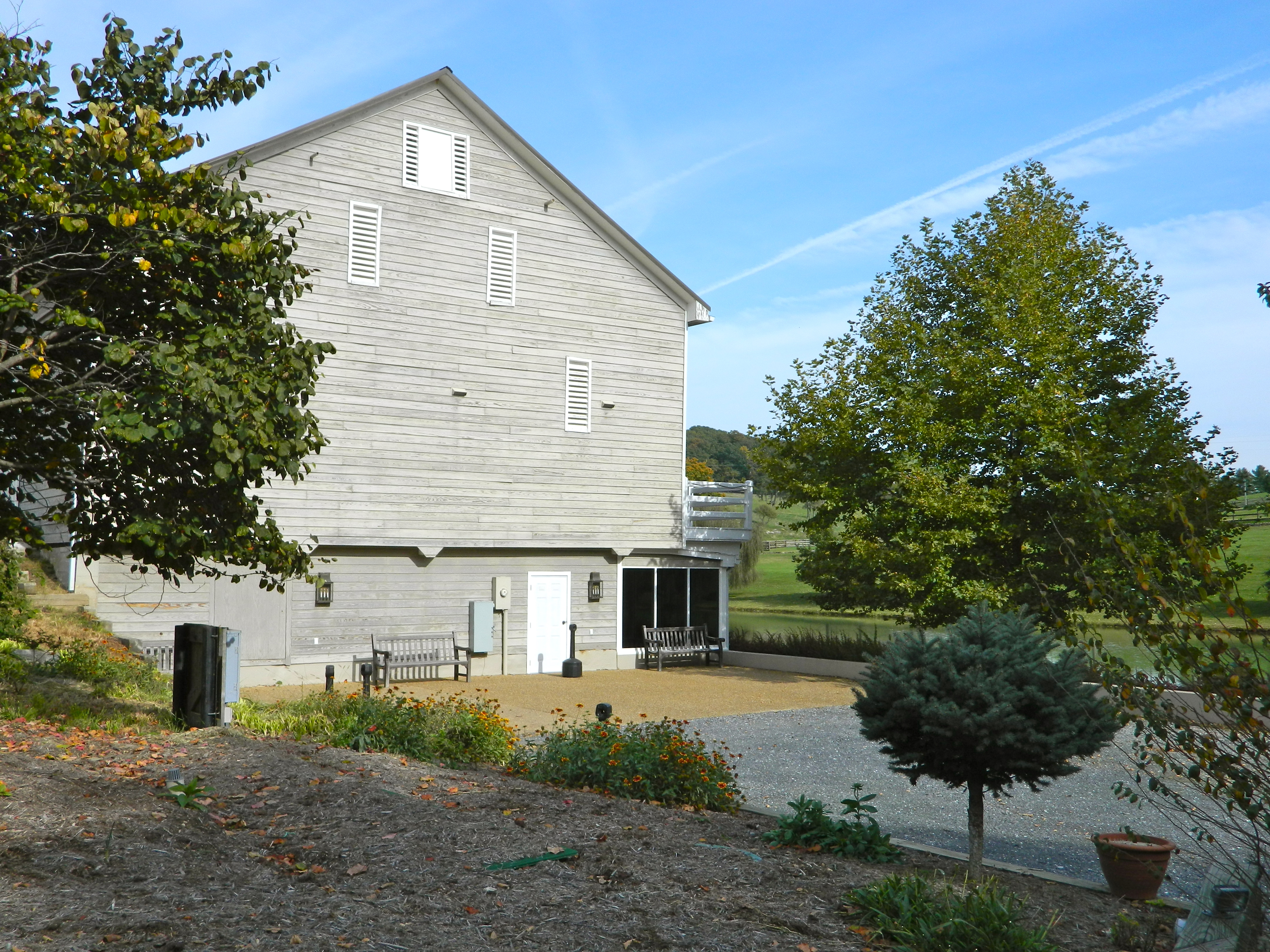
Bank Barn

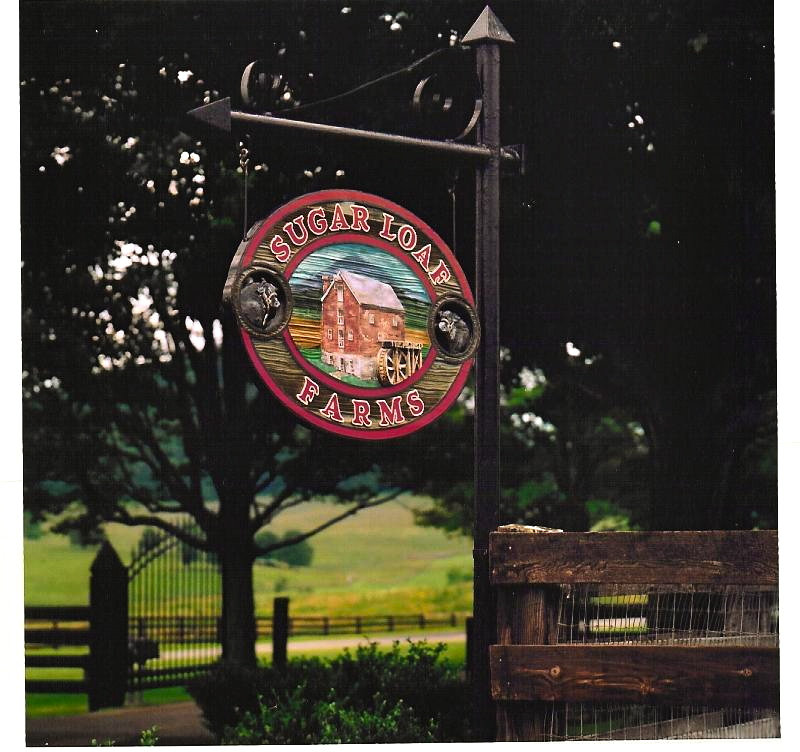

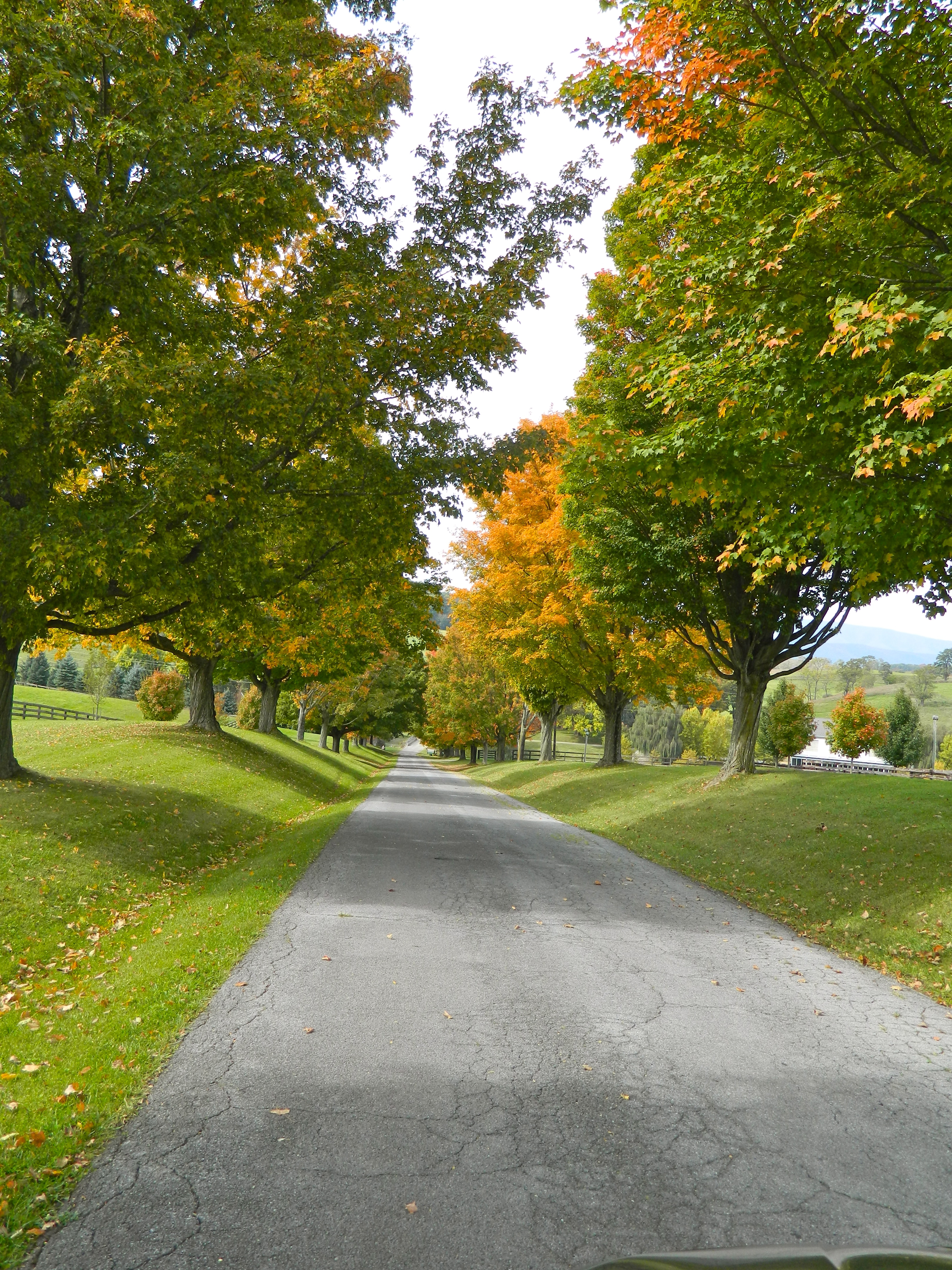
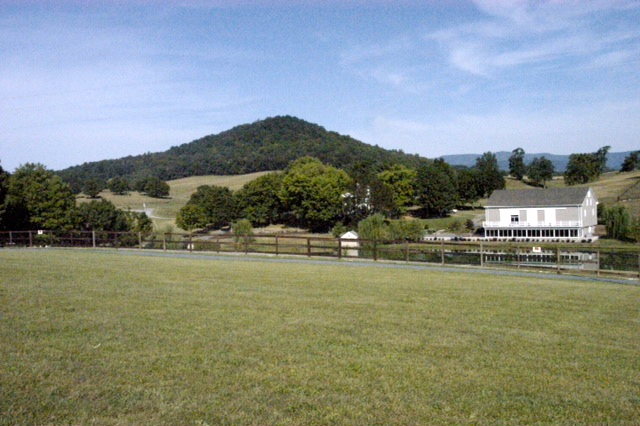
Sugar Loaf Mountain

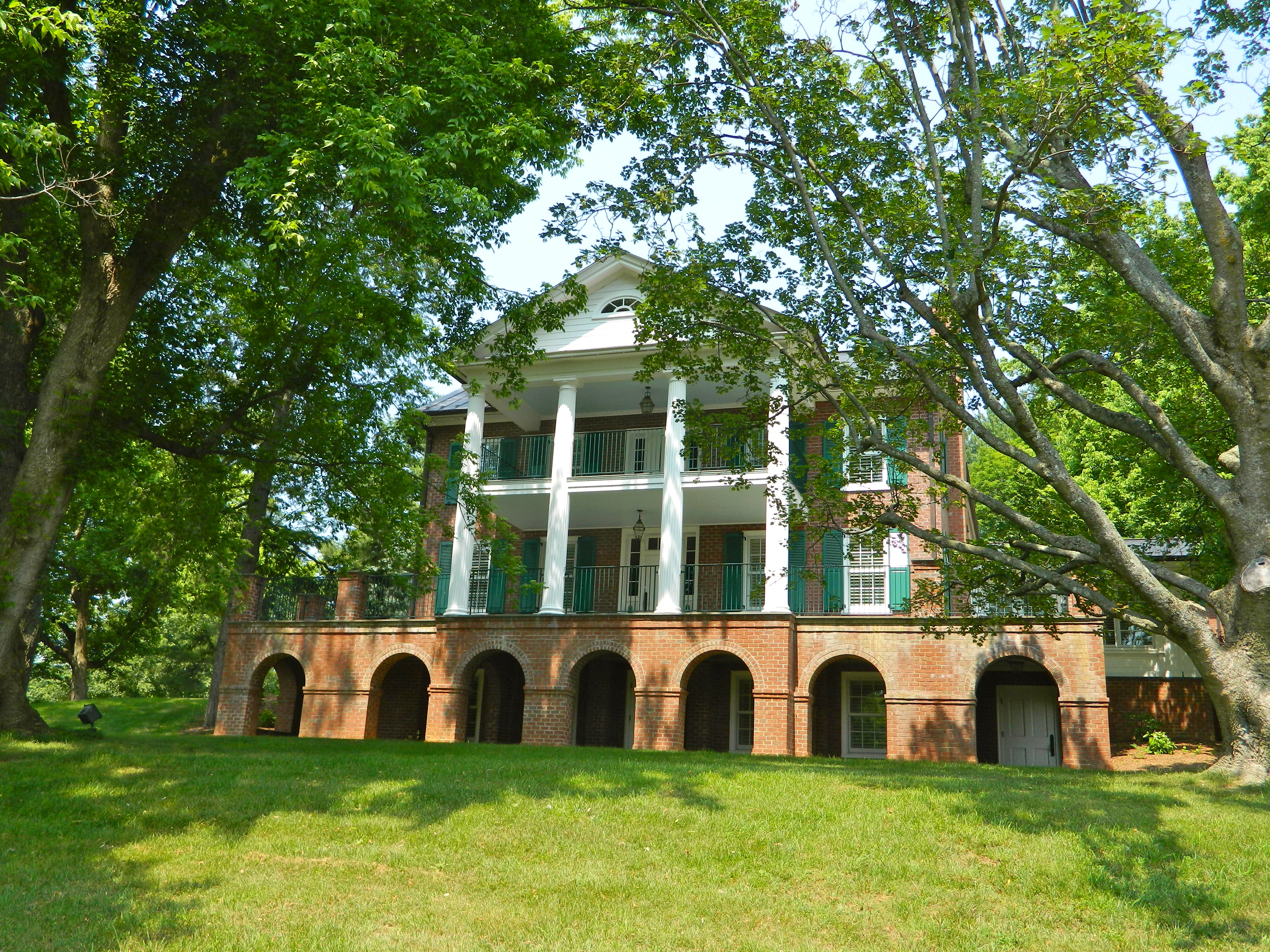
Main Farm House

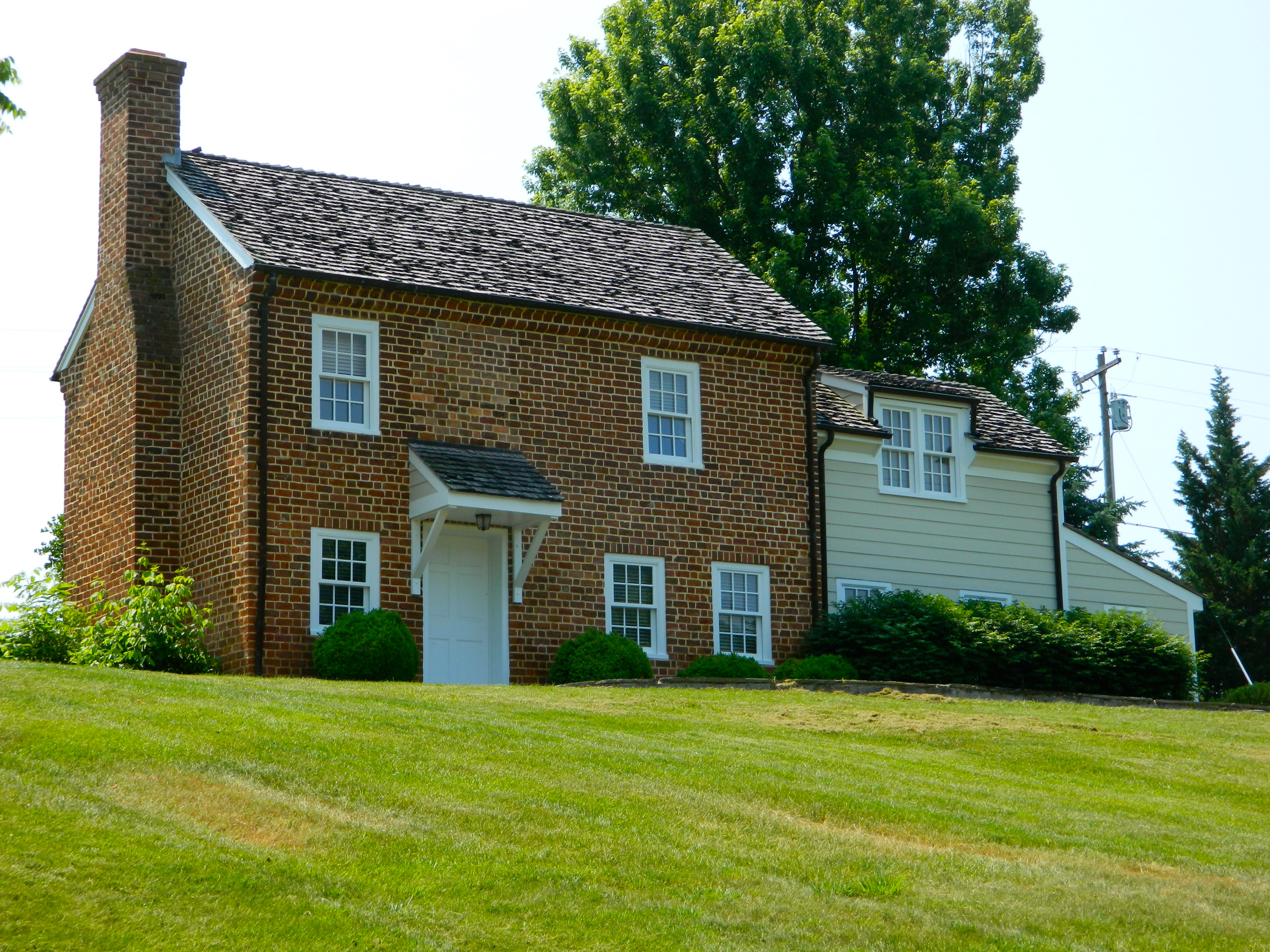
Miller's House

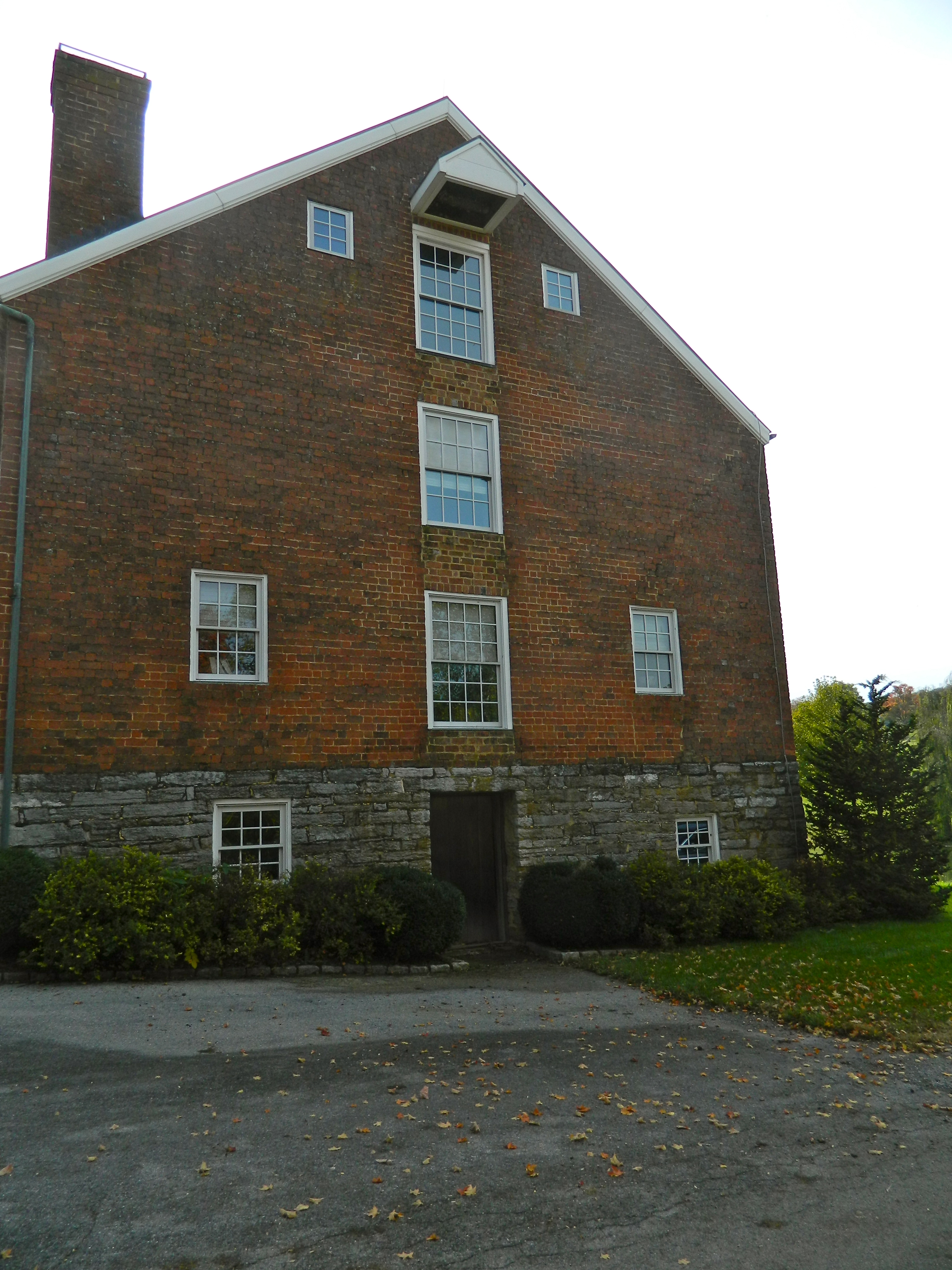
Brick Grist Mill

== Architecture ==
A working farm for nearly 200 years, the agricultural and milling complex gains its meaning through the relationships between the buildings and their surroundings, including fields, roads and streams. The major buildings were constructed within one decade, as parts of a whole. However, changes in family size, architectural tastes, economic markets and agricultural technologies have had a significant impact on the appearance of these structures and on the surrounding landscaping. The property embraces approximately 2,200 acres (890 ha) in area, including an area of 408 acres (165 ha) occupied by the buildings included in the National Register of Historic Places designation; this includes the brick grist mill, miller's house, and stone springhouse.

=== Brick Grist Mill ===
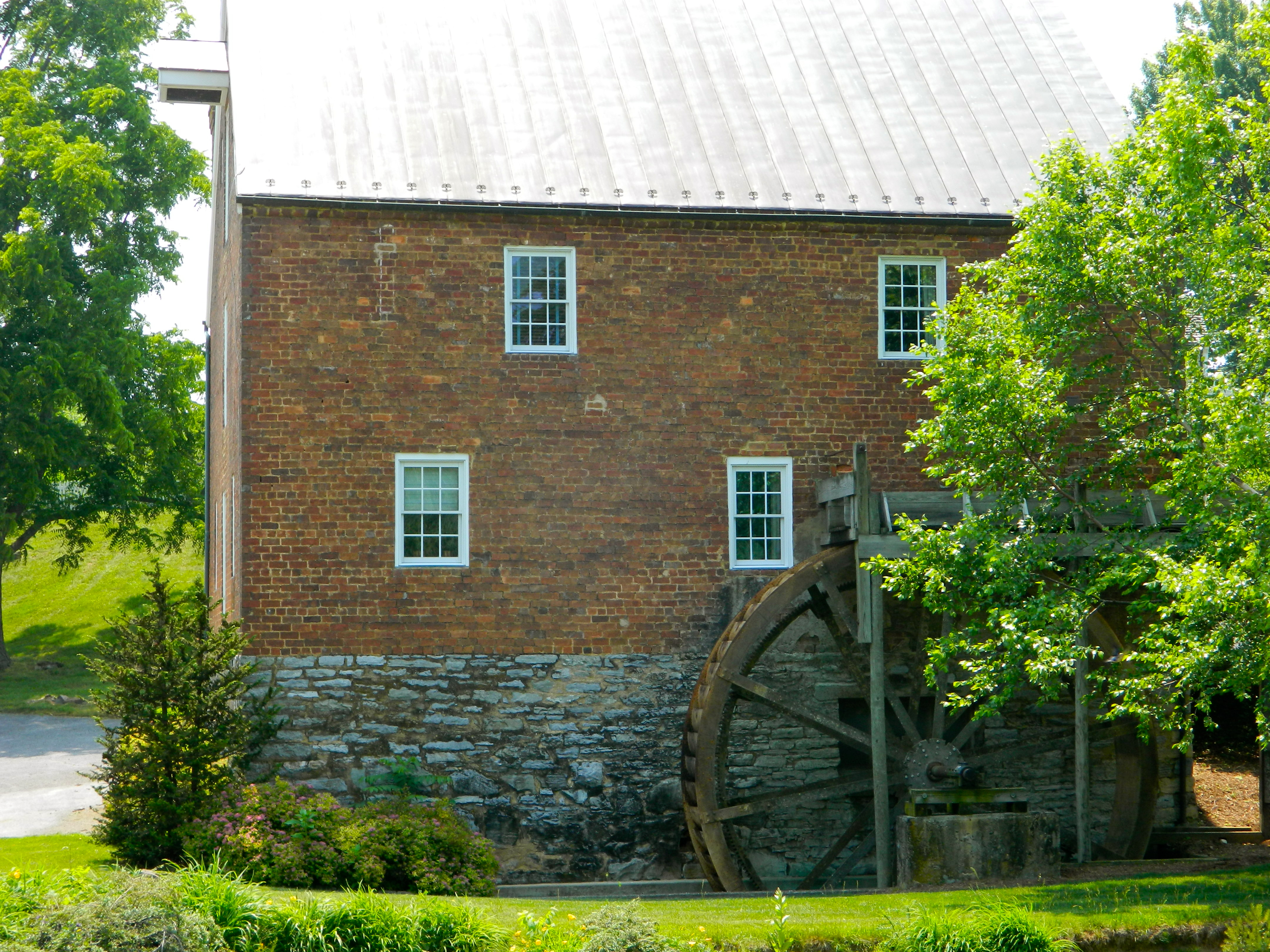
Brick gristmill

The design of the mill is based on the principles of mill construction developed by Oliver Evans (1755–1819). Evans was a leading figure of the time is designing alternatives to the overly complex methods for operating water-powered mills. The mills he designed could be operated by one person, using a single continuous production line and can be found in his book, The Young Mill-Wright and Miller's Guide.

The brick grist mill on Sugar Loaf Farm is a four-story masonry structure. Each level of the grist mill served a different purpose. Controls for the machinery were located on the first level, the grinding process took place on the second level and sifting and grain storage were located on the third and fourth levels. Very little of the original mill machinery is left in the grist mill, but the original hurst frame, which precisely follows Oliver Evan's design, is still there.

=== Miller's House ===
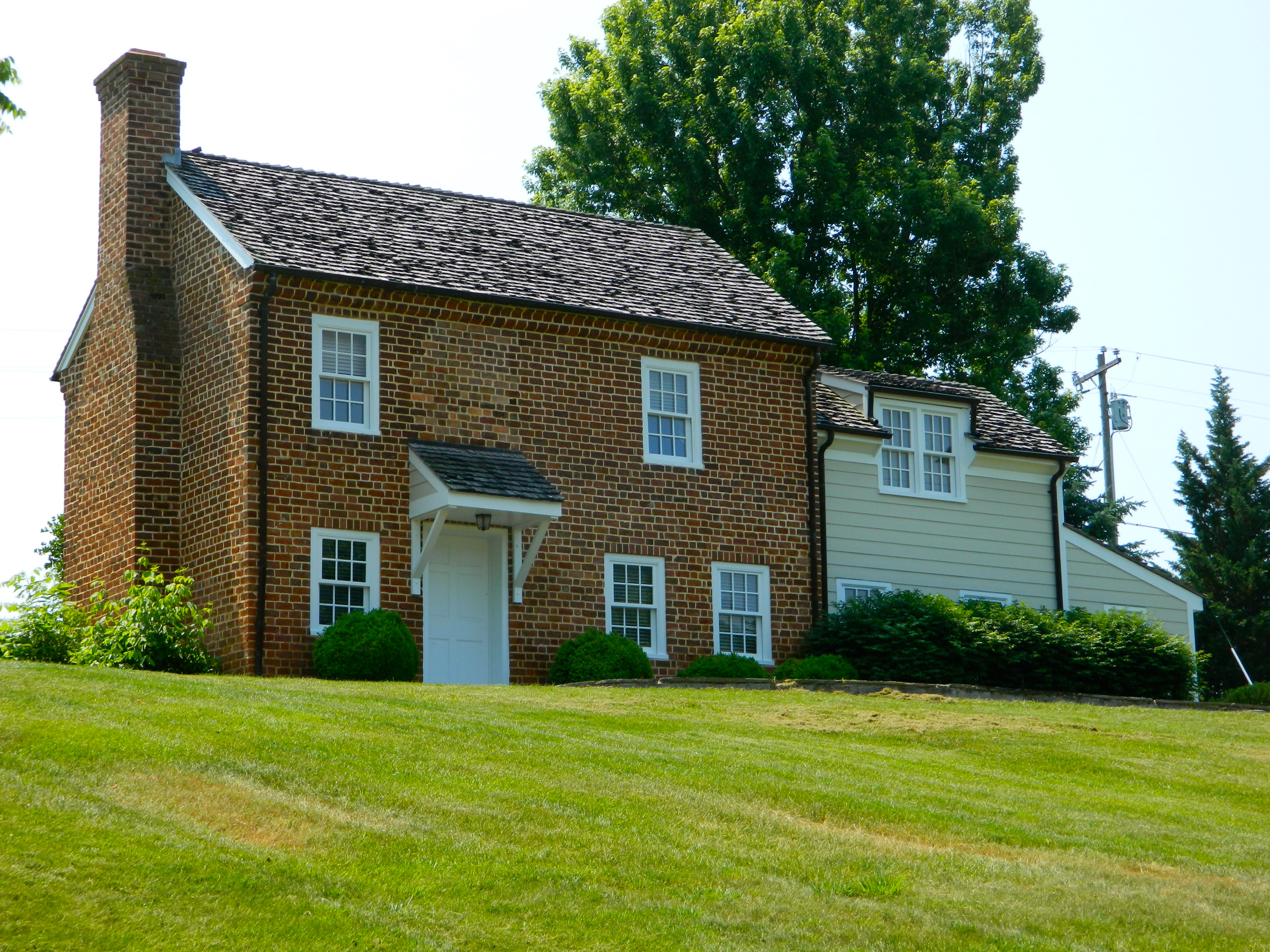
Miller's house

The miller's house and the mill have remained relatively original since their construction in the 1820s. The miller house is a two-story home with two rooms on each level, a north exterior chimney and a corbeled cap. In keeping with the architecture of the main farmhouse at the time, the miller's house included decorative brick cornice molding, oak window and doorframes and a hall-parlor floor plan that was similar to the main farmhouse but at a smaller scale.

=== Stone Springhouse ===
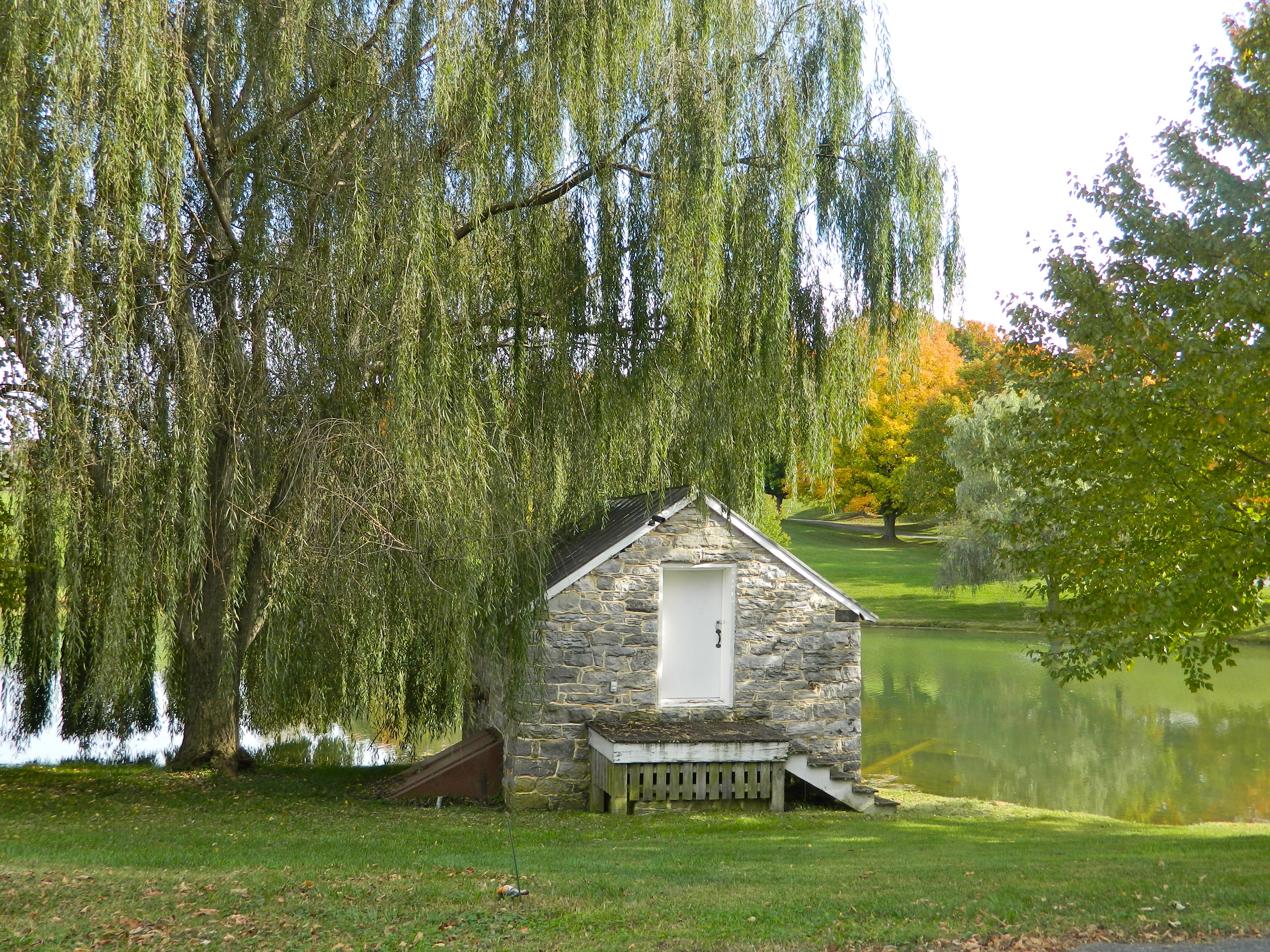
Stone springhouse

The limestone springhouse is located east of the main farmhouse near Eidson Creek, the primary water source of the original enterprise and the controlling utility for the grist mill. The building was probably constructed along with the primary buildings (1820s) as evidenced by the method in which its gable roof rafters and the door and window frames are fashioned after the other primary buildings on the complex.

== Gallery ==
Today, Sugar Loaf Farm is a family operated estate that specializes in raising Black Angus cattle. Located in the heart of the Shenandoah Valley it remains a significant cultural artifact for Augusta County, Virginia.

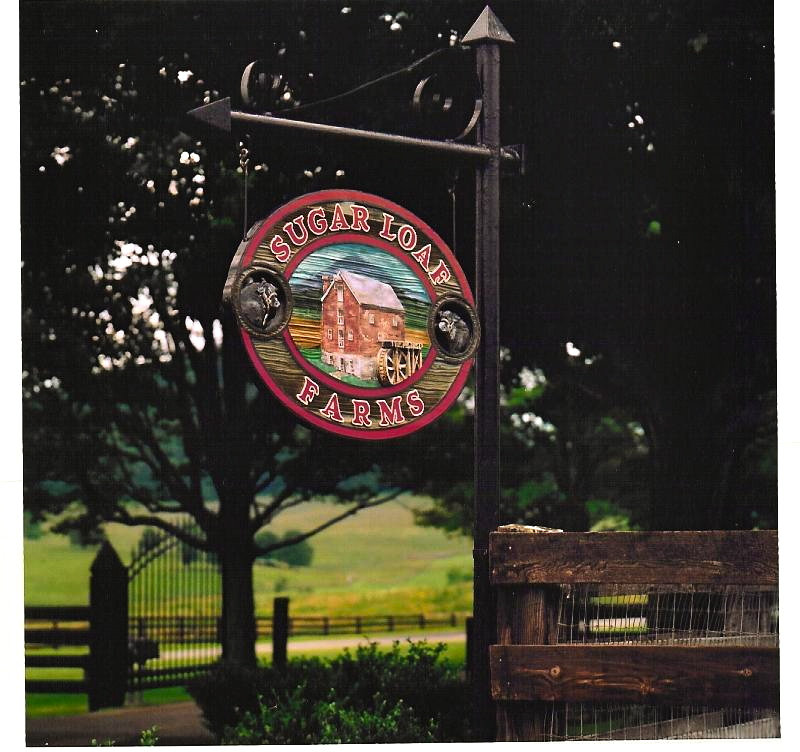
Sugar Loaf Farm

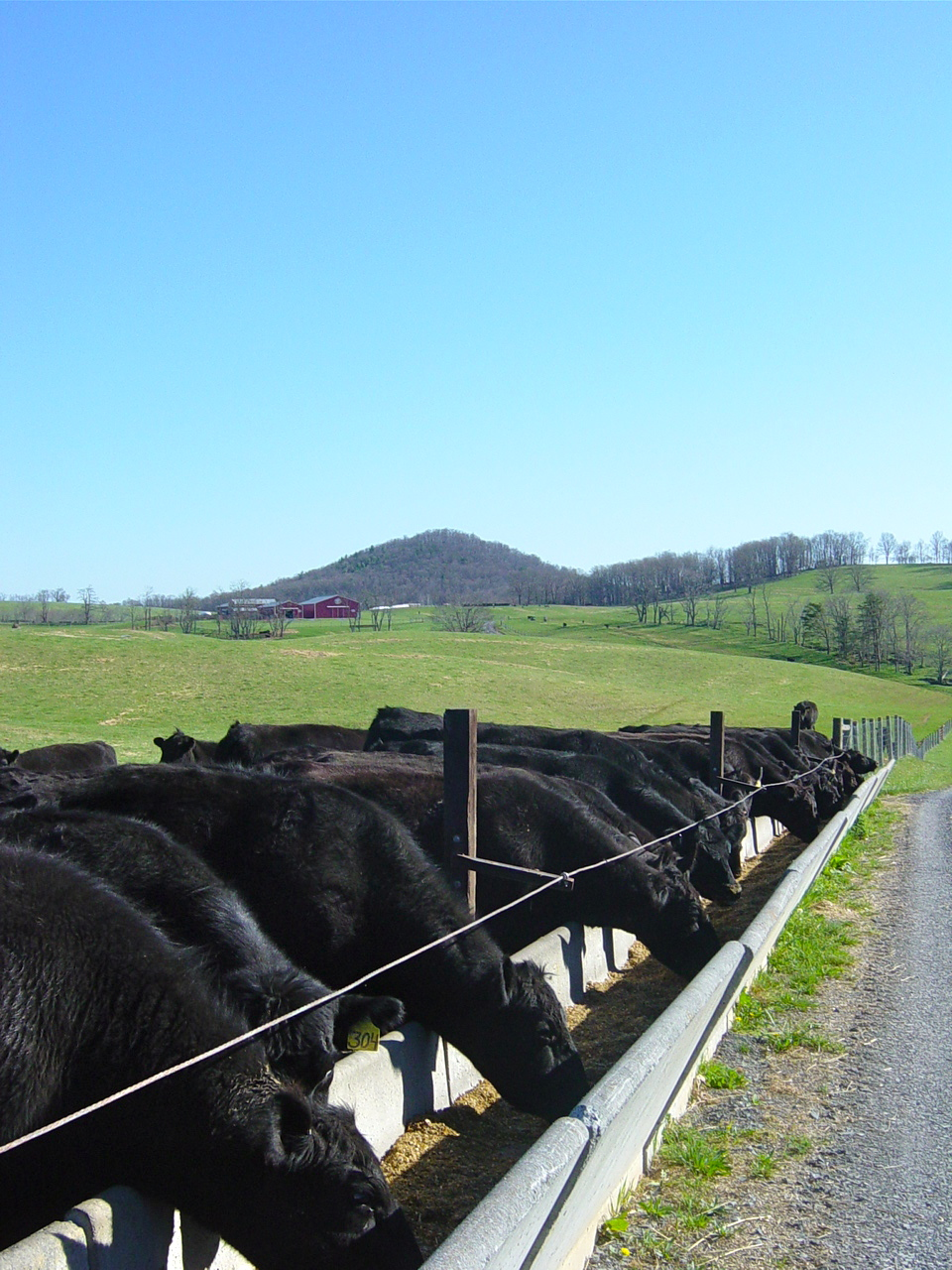
Black Angus Cattle

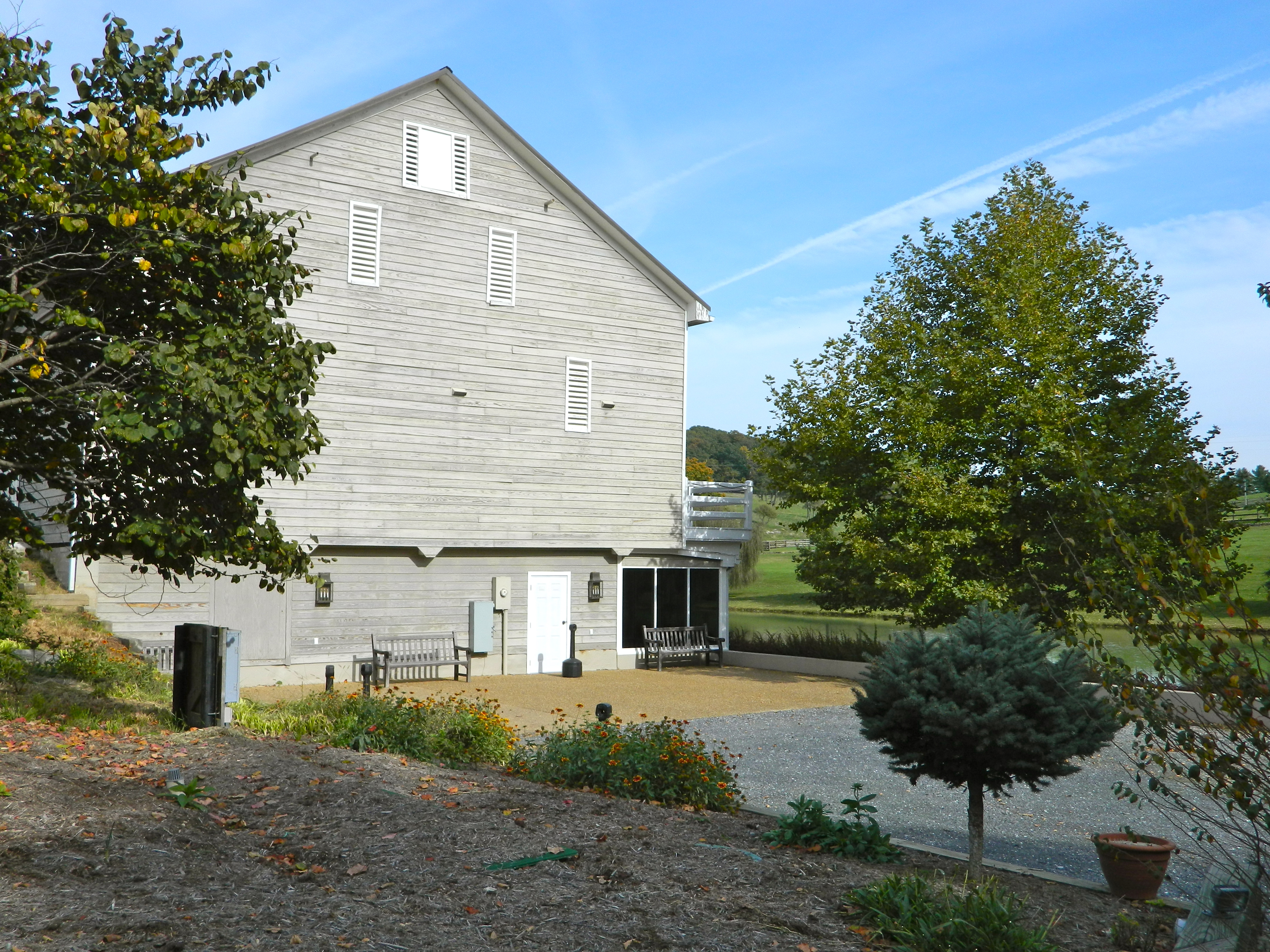
Modern-Day Bank Barn

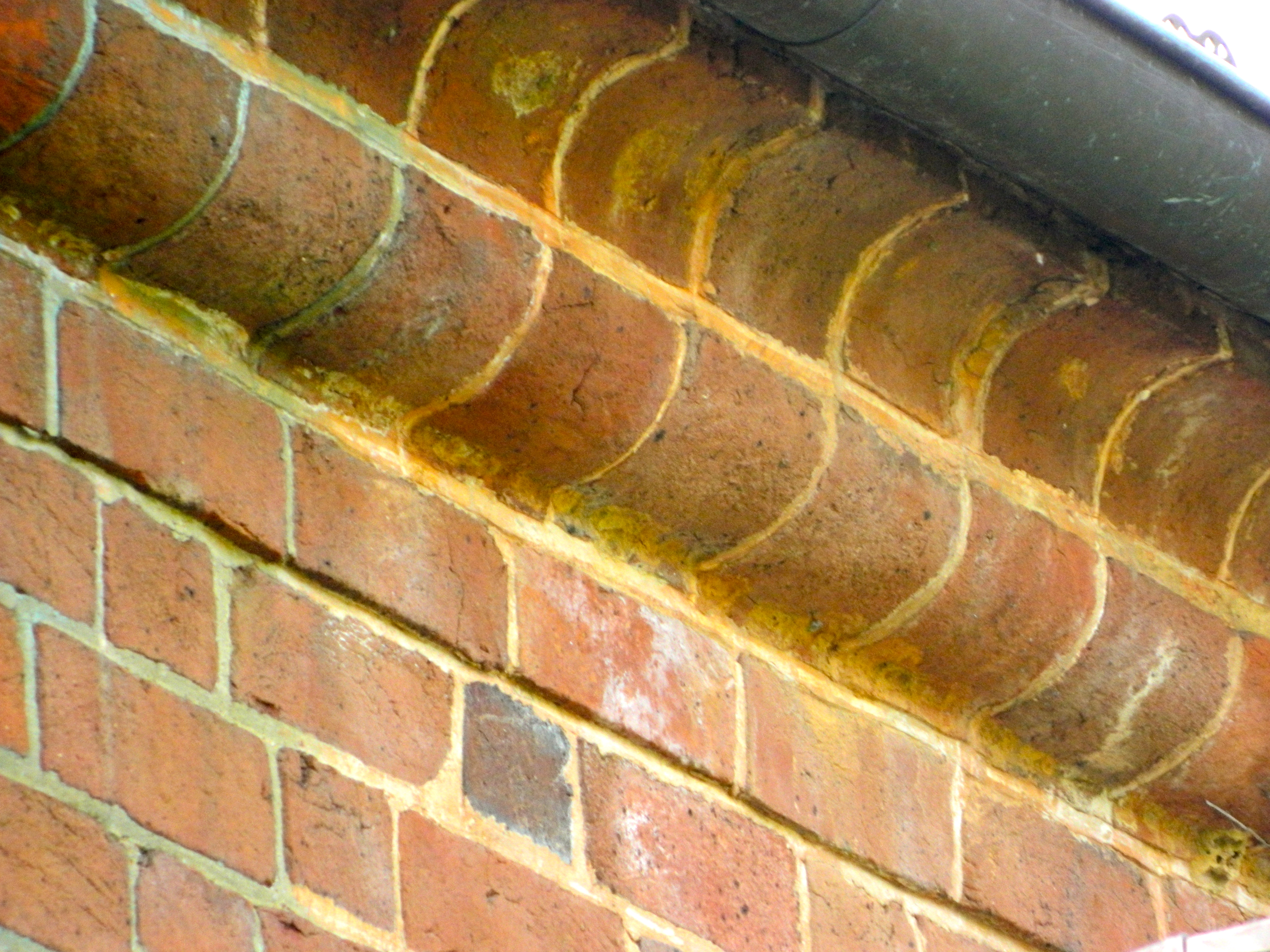
Brick Cornice Molding on Miller House

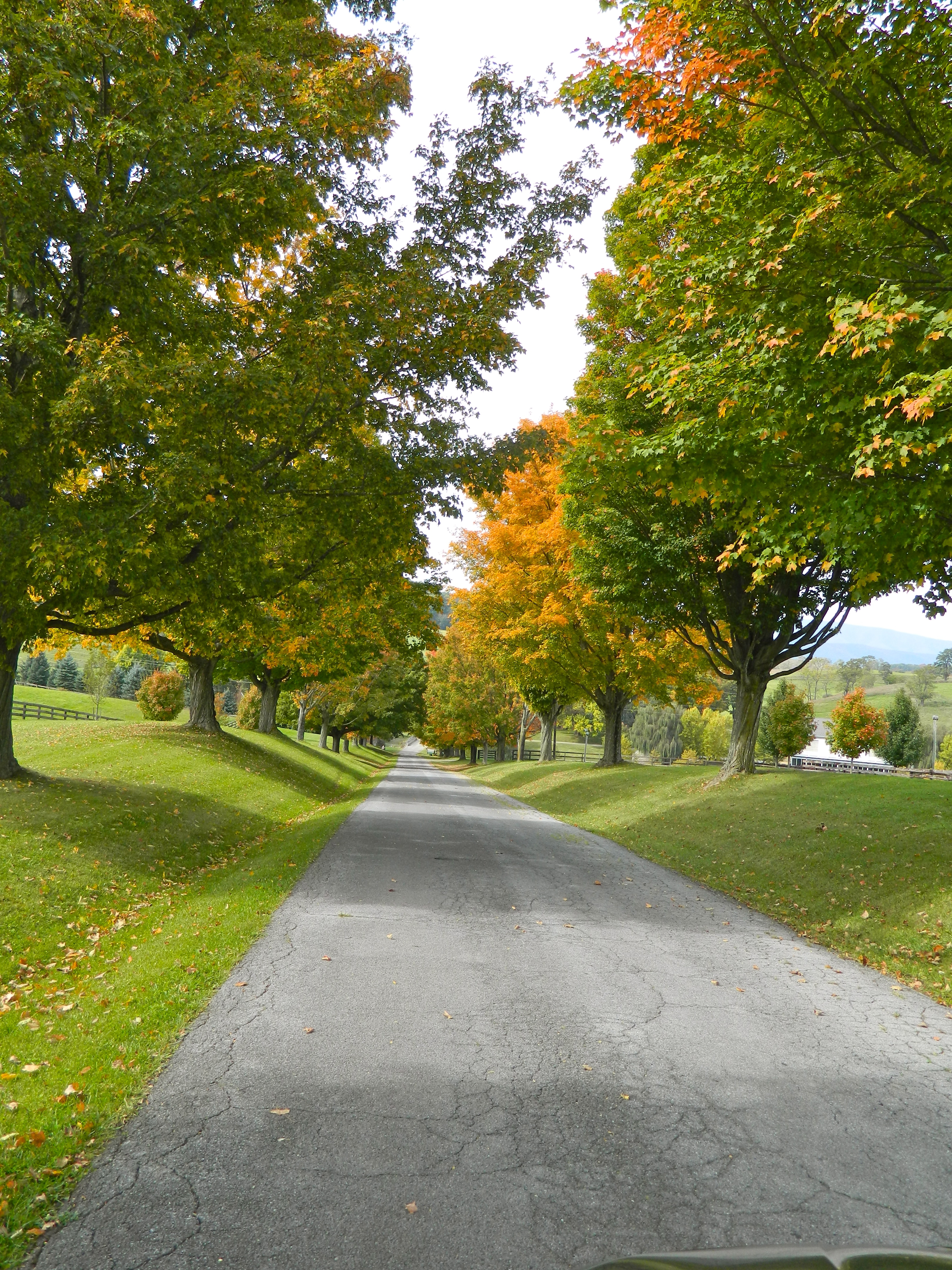
Main Entrance
