= Glebe Schoolhouse =

Historic school building in Virginia, US

- U.S. National Register of Historic Places
- Virginia Landmarks Register
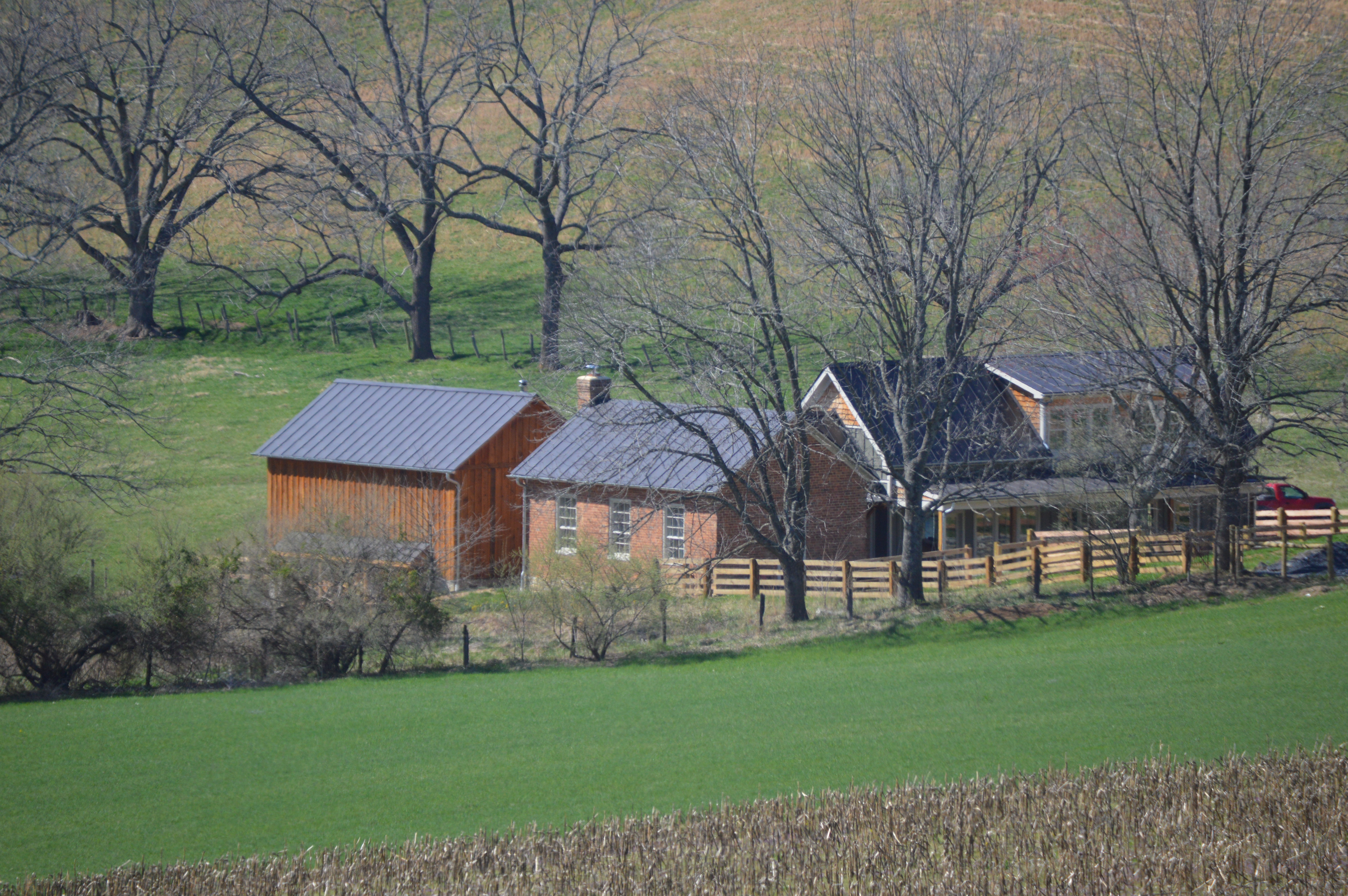
- Distant view from southeast

- Location within Virginia Location within the United States
- Location: VA 876, near Summerdean, Virginia
- Coordinates: 38°6′36″N 79°13′17″W
- Area: 1 acre (0.40 ha)
- Built: 1830
- MPS: Public Schools in Augusta County Virginia 1870-1940 TR
- NRHP reference No.: 85000386
- VLR No.: 007-0706

Significant dates
- Added to NRHP: February 27, 1985
- Designated VLR: December 11, 1984

Glebe Schoolhouse is a historic one-room school building located near Summerdean, Augusta County, Virginia, built in 1830. It is the "only extant one-room school of brick construction, the oldest documented schoolhouse, and one of the few surviving privately built schoolhouses" in Augusta County. The school closed in the early-20th century, and was subsequently converted to a private dwelling.

It was listed on the National Register of Historic Places in 1985.

== History and description ==
Glebe Schoolhouse was built by the Thompson family as a private school for them and their neighbors. The earliest references to the structure is on a deed dated December 27, 1830: This deed conveys a parcel of one acre (0.40 ha), 20 poles (5,445 sq ft (0.05 ha)), to the three named trustees and their heirs, "being the same lot of land on which a brick building has been lately put up by the direction and under the care of said trustees." The deed specifies that the building is "a house to be used as a schoolhouse for the neighborhood around it and also for a place for religious meetings, said house being free to preachers of all Christian denominations who shall be regularly authorized to preach the gospel according to the forms of their own churches except Roman Catholics and Unitarians who are not to be permitted said house may also be used for other public purposes occasionally when the trustees shall permit it." The county purchased it when the free public school system began later in the century. The school was closed when the county consolidated it with another one-room school into a two-room school called Swanton in the early 20th century. It was later sold and converted into a private dwelling.

"It was a one-room, brick schoolhouse with a gable roof and gable-end chimney. A single door provided entry into the east gable end, while three windows with 9-over-6 sash line each side wall. The walls are laid in an irregular pattern of four- to five- course American bond with Flemish variant. A frame ell was added when the building was remodeled."
