= Mount Meridian, Virginia =

Unincorporated community in Virginia, United States

- Unincorporated community
- Location within Virginia Location within the United States
- Coordinates: 38°15′41″N 78°51′36″W
- Country: United States
- State: Virginia
- County: Augusta
- Elevation: 1,119 ft (341 m)
- Time zone: UTC-5 (Eastern (EST))
  - Summer (DST): UTC-4 (EDT)
- Area code: 540
- GNIS feature ID: 1470932

Mount Meridian is an unincorporated community in Augusta County, Virginia, United States. Mount Meridian is located on the Middle River 1.9 miles (3.1 km) west of Grottoes. The Mt. Meridian Schoolhouse, which is listed on the National Register of Historic Places, is located near Mount Meridian.

Politician James A. Walker was a native of the Mount Meridian area.
