= Mossy Creek, Virginia =

Unincorporated community in Virginia, United States

- Unincorporated community
- Location within Virginia Location within the United States
- Coordinates: 38°21′26″N 79°01′43″W
- Country: United States
- State: Virginia
- County: Augusta
- Elevation: 1,260 ft (380 m)
- Time zone: UTC-5 (Eastern (EST))
  - Summer (DST): UTC-4 (EDT)
- Area code: 540
- GNIS feature ID: 1470787

Mossy Creek is an unincorporated community in Augusta County, Virginia, United States. Mossy Creek is located on Virginia State Route 42, 3.3 miles (5.3 km) west-southwest of Bridgewater. The Hannah Miller House and the Henry Miller House, which are listed on the National Register of Historic Places, are both located near Mossy Creek.
