= Henry Miller House (Mossy Creek, Virginia) =

Historic house in Virginia, United States

- U.S. National Register of Historic Places
- Virginia Landmarks Register
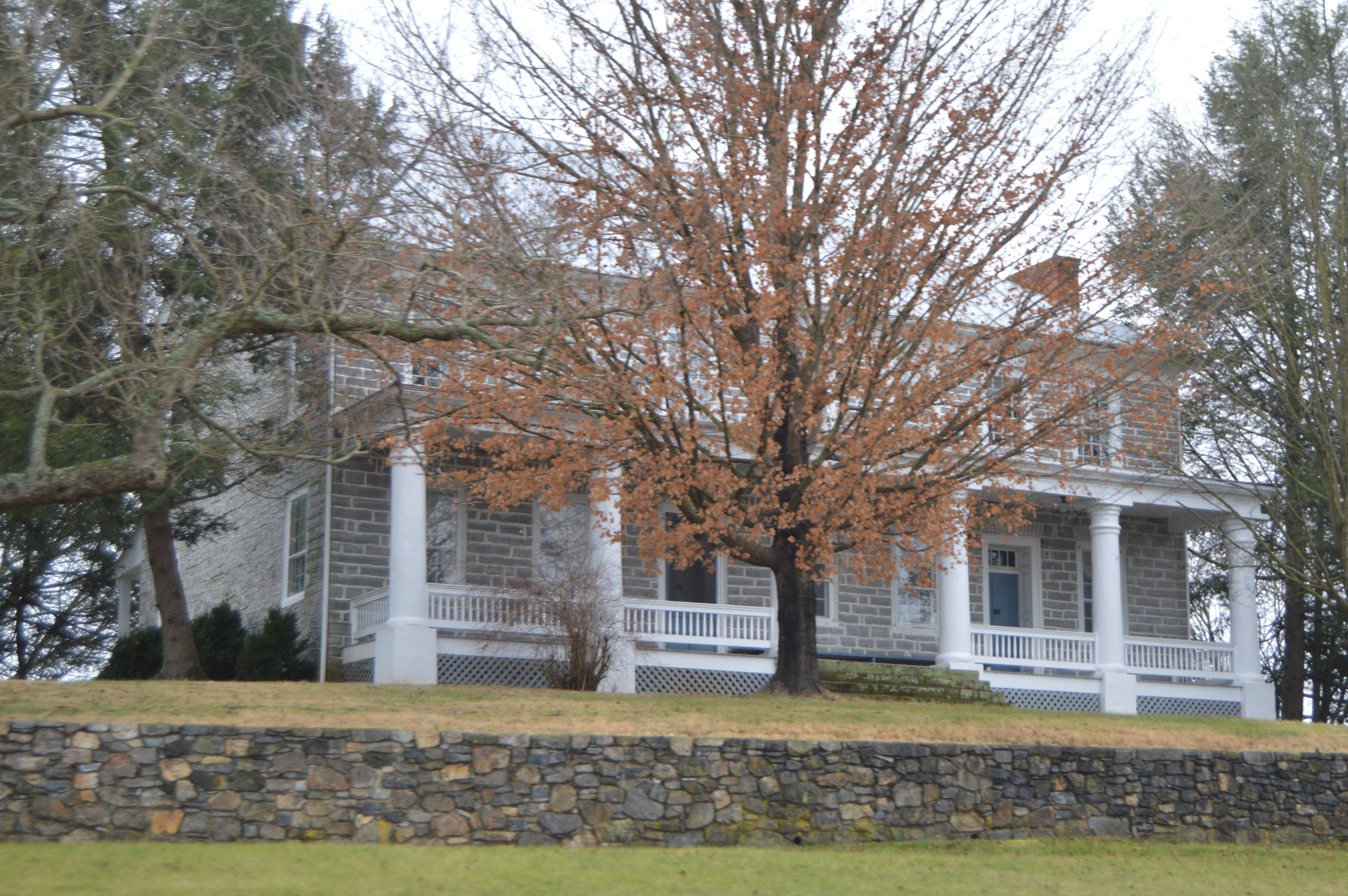
- Front and western side

- Location within Virginia Location within the United States
- Location: East of Mossy Creek on VA 42, near Mossy Creek, Virginia
- Coordinates: 38°21′27″N 79°1′40″W
- Area: 9 acres (3.6 ha)
- Built: c. 1785
- NRHP reference No.: 79003029
- VLR No.: 007-0070

Significant dates
- Added to NRHP: May 23, 1979
- Designated VLR: February 21, 1978

Henry Miller House is a historic home located near Mossy Creek, Augusta County, Virginia. The original section was built about 1785, and expanded in the mid-19th century. It is a two-story, stone and brick dwelling with a combined gable and hipped roof. It consists of a square, four-bay, double-pile section with a three-bay, single-pile attached wing to form unbroken seven-bay facade. It features a full-width, one-story porch. Also on the property are a contributing two-story, one-cell rubble stone kitchen and two-story, three-bay, single-cell spring house.

It was listed on the National Register of Historic Places in 1978.
