= Cedar Green, Virginia =

Unincorporated community in Virginia, United States

- Unincorporated community
- Location within Virginia Location within the United States
- Coordinates: 38°09′03″N 79°07′43″W
- Country: United States
- State: Virginia
- County: Augusta
- Elevation: 1,676 ft (511 m)
- Time zone: UTC-5 (Eastern (EST))
  - Summer (DST): UTC-4 (EDT)
- Area code: 540
- GNIS feature ID: 1492734

Cedar Green is an unincorporated community in Augusta County, Virginia, United States. Cedar Green is located along Virginia State Route 254, 3.1 miles (5.0 km) west of Staunton. The Augusta County Training School, which is listed on the National Register of Historic Places, is located near Cedar Green.
