= Newport, Augusta County, Virginia =

Unincorporated community in Virginia, United States

Newport, Virginia
- Unincorporated community
- Location within Virginia Location within the United States
- Coordinates: 38°00′03″N 79°18′03″W
- Country: United States
- State: Virginia
- County: Augusta
- Elevation: 1,716 ft (523 m)
- Time zone: UTC-5 (Eastern (EST))
  - Summer (DST): UTC-4 (EDT)
- Area code: 540
- GNIS feature ID: 1493345

Newport is an unincorporated community in Augusta County, Virginia, United States. Newport is located on Virginia State Route 252, 7 miles (11 km) southeast of Craigsville.

The Moffett's Creek Schoolhouse and Walker's Creek Schoolhouse are listed on the National Register of Historic Places.
