= Moffett's Creek Schoolhouse =

- U.S. National Register of Historic Places
- Virginia Landmarks Register
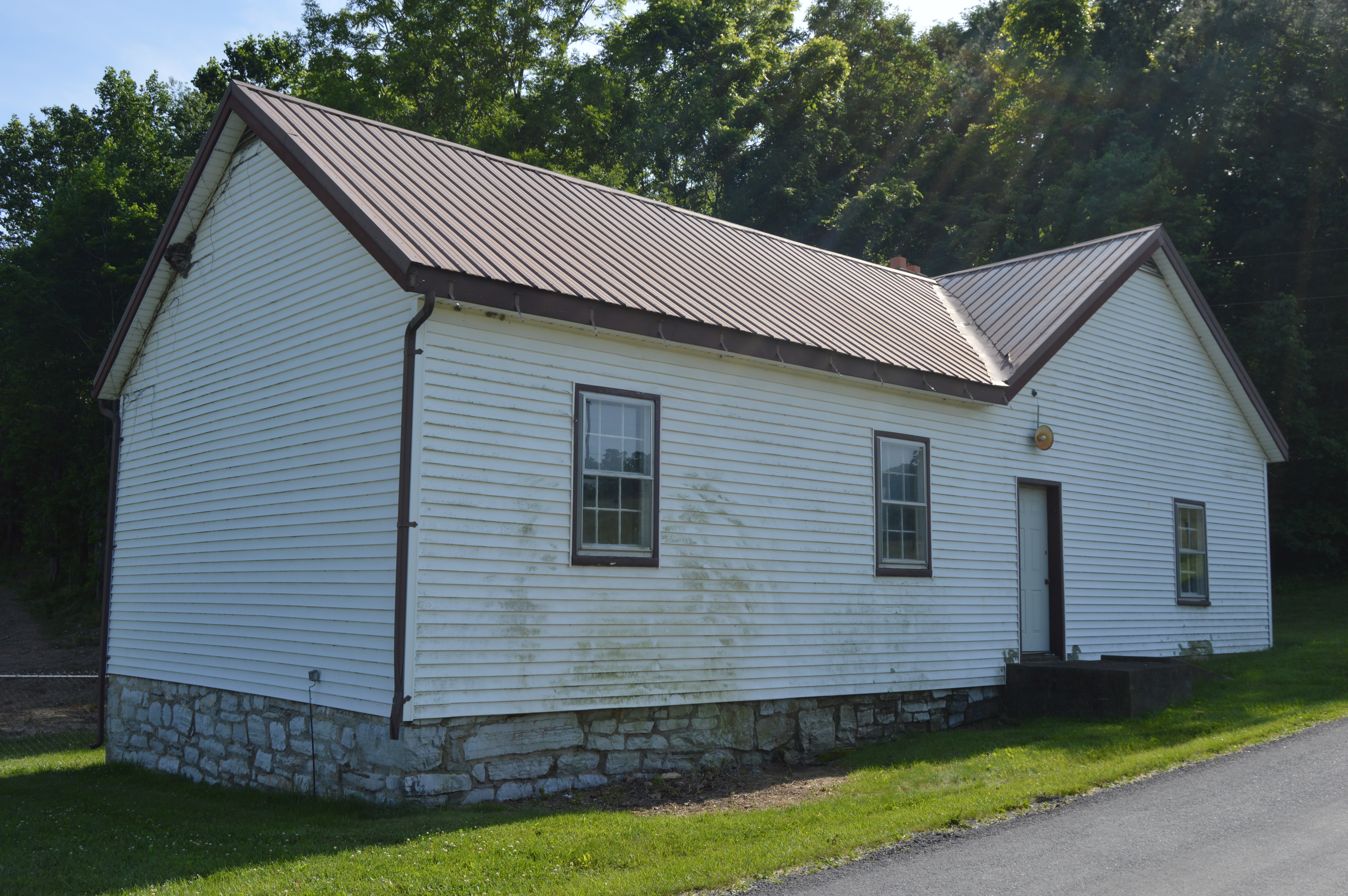
- Front and eastern side

- Location within Virginia Location within the United States
- Location: Mount Hermon Road, near Newport, Virginia
- Coordinates: 38°0′8″N 79°18′28″W
- Area: 1 acre (0.40 ha)
- Built: 1873
- MPS: Public Schools in Augusta County Virginia 1870-1940 TR
- NRHP reference No.: 85000389
- VLR No.: 007-0547

Significant dates
- Added to NRHP: February 27, 1985
- Designated VLR: December 11, 1984

Moffett's Creek Schoolhouse is a historic public school building located near Newport, Augusta County, Virginia. It was built in 1873, as a two-room, frame schoolhouse. It sits on a fieldstone foundation and has a gable roof. An addition was built in the 1880s, creating an L-shaped plan. The school closed in 1923, and the property was sold to the Mt. Hermon Lutheran Church.

It was listed on the National Register of Historic Places in 1985.
