= Walker's Creek Schoolhouse =

- U.S. National Register of Historic Places
- Virginia Landmarks Register
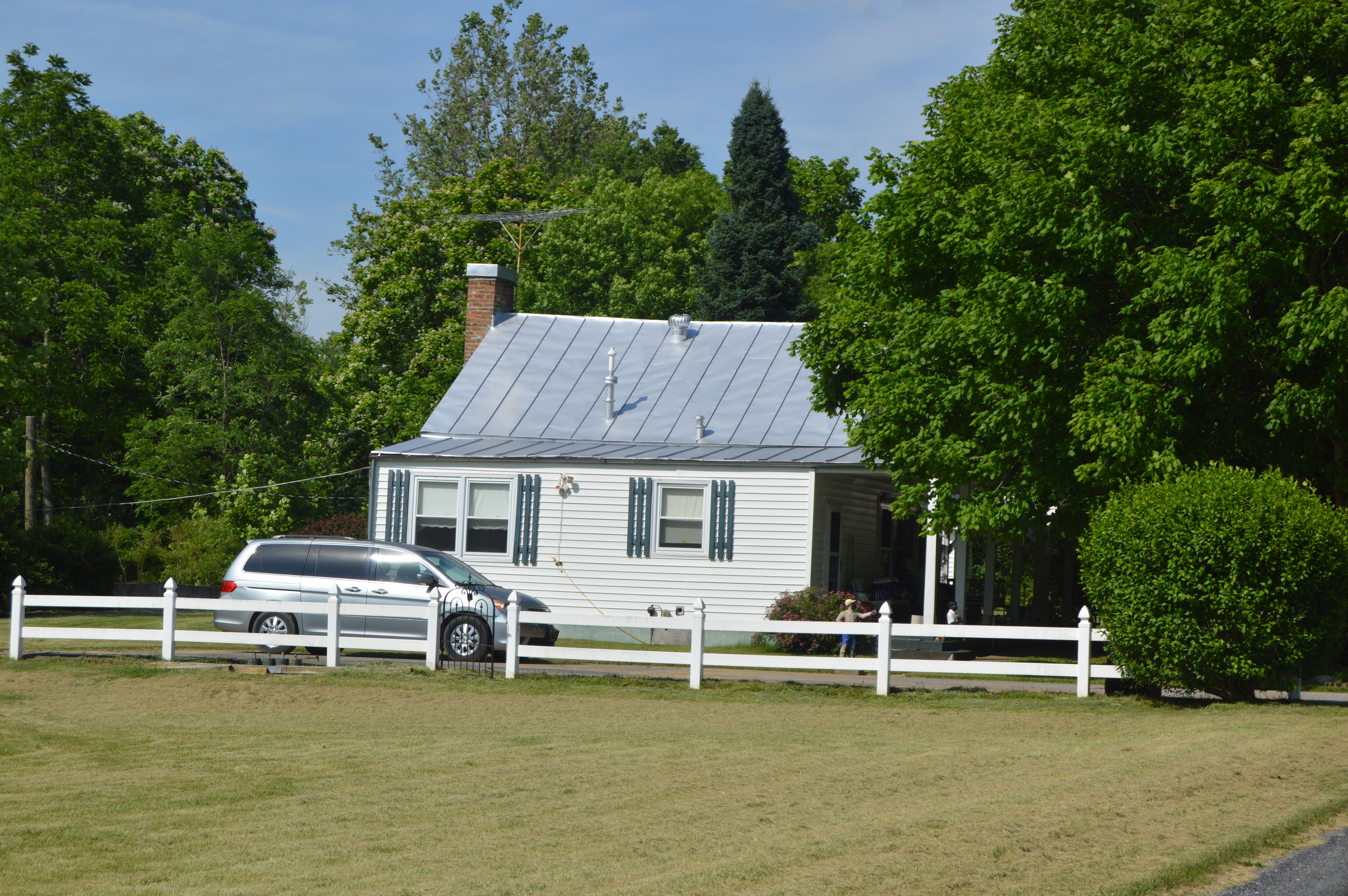
- Southwestern side

- Location within Virginia Location within the United States
- Location: Walker Creek Road, near Newport, Virginia
- Coordinates: 38°0′57″N 79°19′54″W
- Area: 1 acre (0.40 ha)
- Built: c. 1850
- MPS: Public Schools in Augusta County Virginia 1870-1940 TR
- NRHP reference No.: 85000396
- VLR No.: 007-0539

Significant dates
- Added to NRHP: February 27, 1985
- Designated VLR: December 11, 1984

Walker's Creek Schoolhouse is a historic one-room school building located near Newport, Augusta County, Virginia. It was built about 1850, as a one-room, rectangular log, gable roofed schoolhouse measuring 22 feet by 26 feet. It has a large stone chimney, and a later shed addition and front porch. The school closed about 1935, and after 1948 was converted to a dwelling.

It was listed on the National Register of Historic Places in 1985.
