= Mt. Meridian Schoolhouse =

- U.S. National Register of Historic Places
- Virginia Landmarks Register
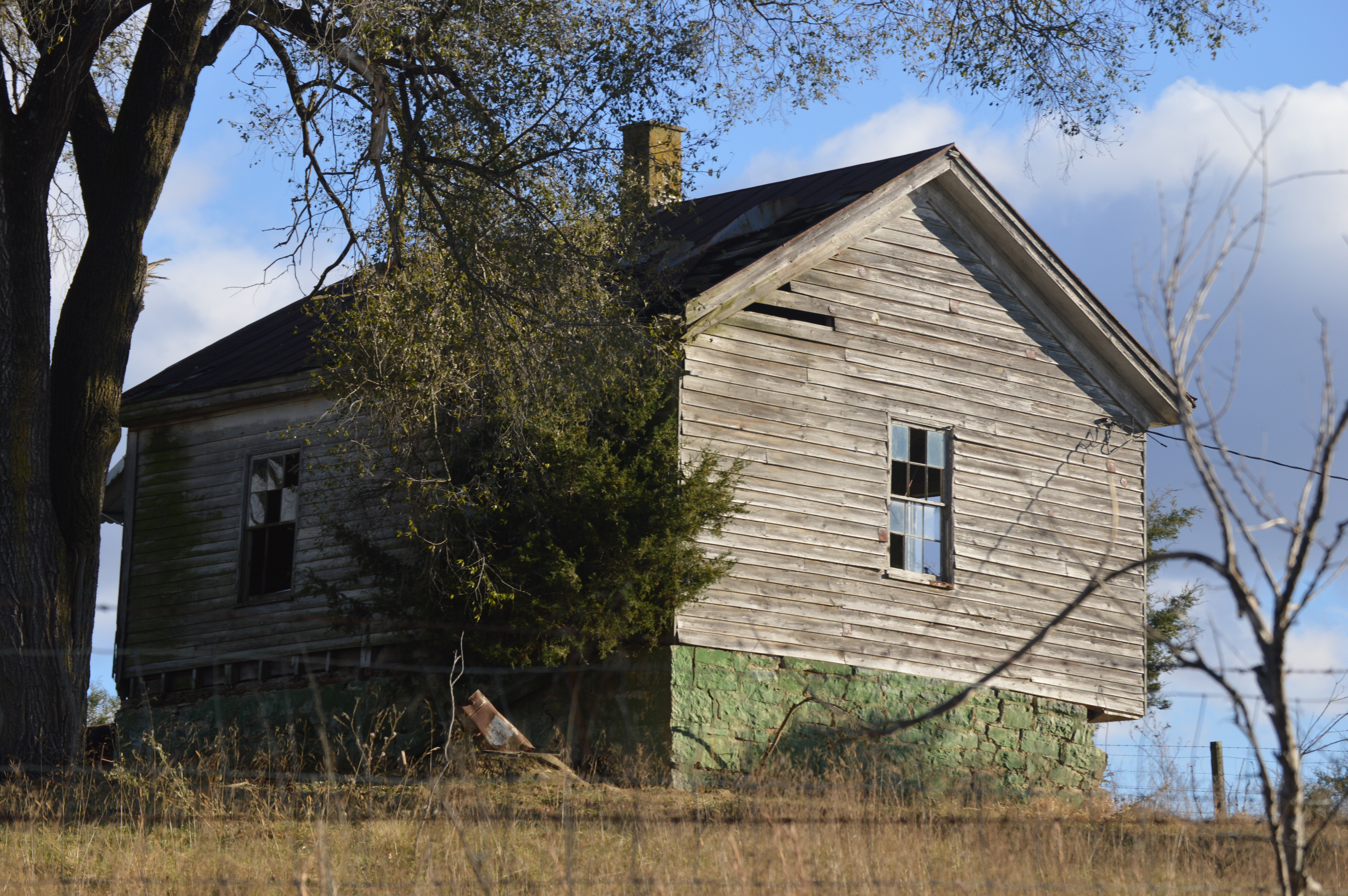
- Front and northern side

- Location within Virginia Location within the United States
- Location: Rockfish Road, Mt. Meridian, Virginia
- Coordinates: 38°15′35″N 78°51′38.5″W
- Area: 1 acre (0.40 ha)
- Built: 1886
- MPS: Public Schools in Augusta County Virginia 1870-1940 TR
- NRHP reference No.: 85000390
- VLR No.: 007-0996

Significant dates
- Added to NRHP: February 27, 1985
- Designated VLR: December 11, 1984

Mt. Meridian Schoolhouse is a historic one-room school building located at Mt. Meridian, Augusta County, Virginia. It was built in 1886, and is a one-story, rectangular frame building with a gable roof. By 1890, the school had been enlarged to two rooms, which was later removed. The school closed in 1908.

It was listed on the National Register of Historic Places in 1985.
