= Middlebrook Schools =

Historic school buildings in Virginia, US

- Middlebrook School; Middlebrook High School
- U.S. National Register of Historic Places
- Virginia Landmarks Register
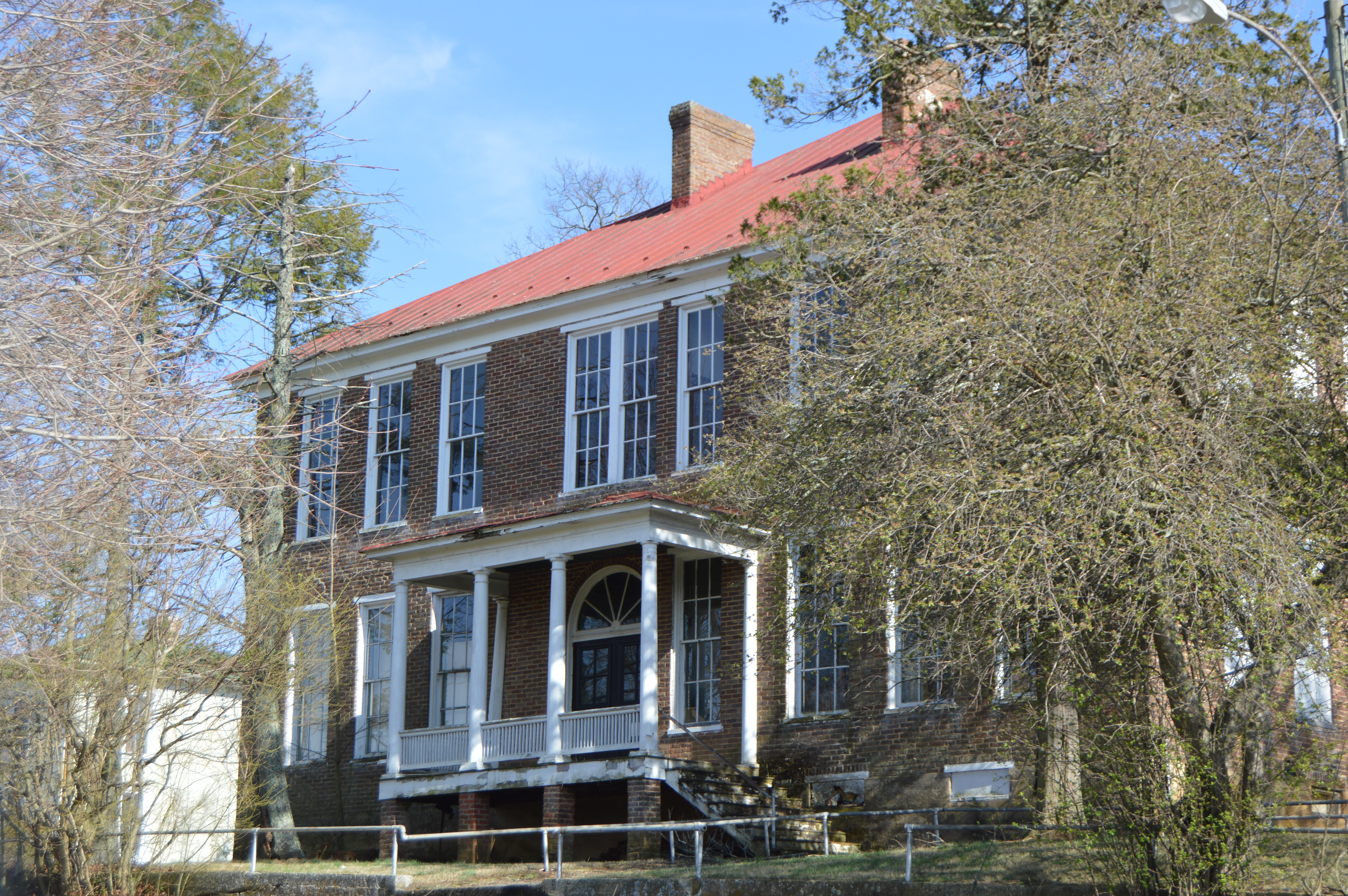
- Front of the older school

- Location within Virginia Location within the United States
- Location: VA 670, Middlebrook, Virginia
- Coordinates: 38°3′0″N 79°12′48″W
- Area: 1.3 acres (0.53 ha)
- Built: 1916; 1919, 1922-1923
- Built by: Irvin Swortzel; Blaine and David Weaver
- Architectural style: Colonial Revival, Vernacular Colonial Revival
- MPS: Public Schools in Augusta County Virginia 1870--1940 TR
- NRHP reference No.: 85000387; 85000388
- VLR No.: 007-0686

Significant dates
- Added to NRHP: February 27, 1985
- Designated VLR: December 11, 1984

The Middlebrook Schools are a pair of historic public school buildings located at Middlebrook, Augusta County, Virginia. The original school building was built in 1916 and expanded in 1919. A separate high school was built adjacent to it in 1922–1923, and an agriculture shop building was added in the 1930s. The original school is an L-shaped, two-story building consisting of two front rooms and a south ell room, with a one-room plan, two-story addition creating a square plan. It has a hipped roof and vernacular Colonial Revival style entrance. The interior also reflects the Colonial Revival style. The school closed in 1967.

Both buildings were listed on the National Register of Historic Places in 1985.

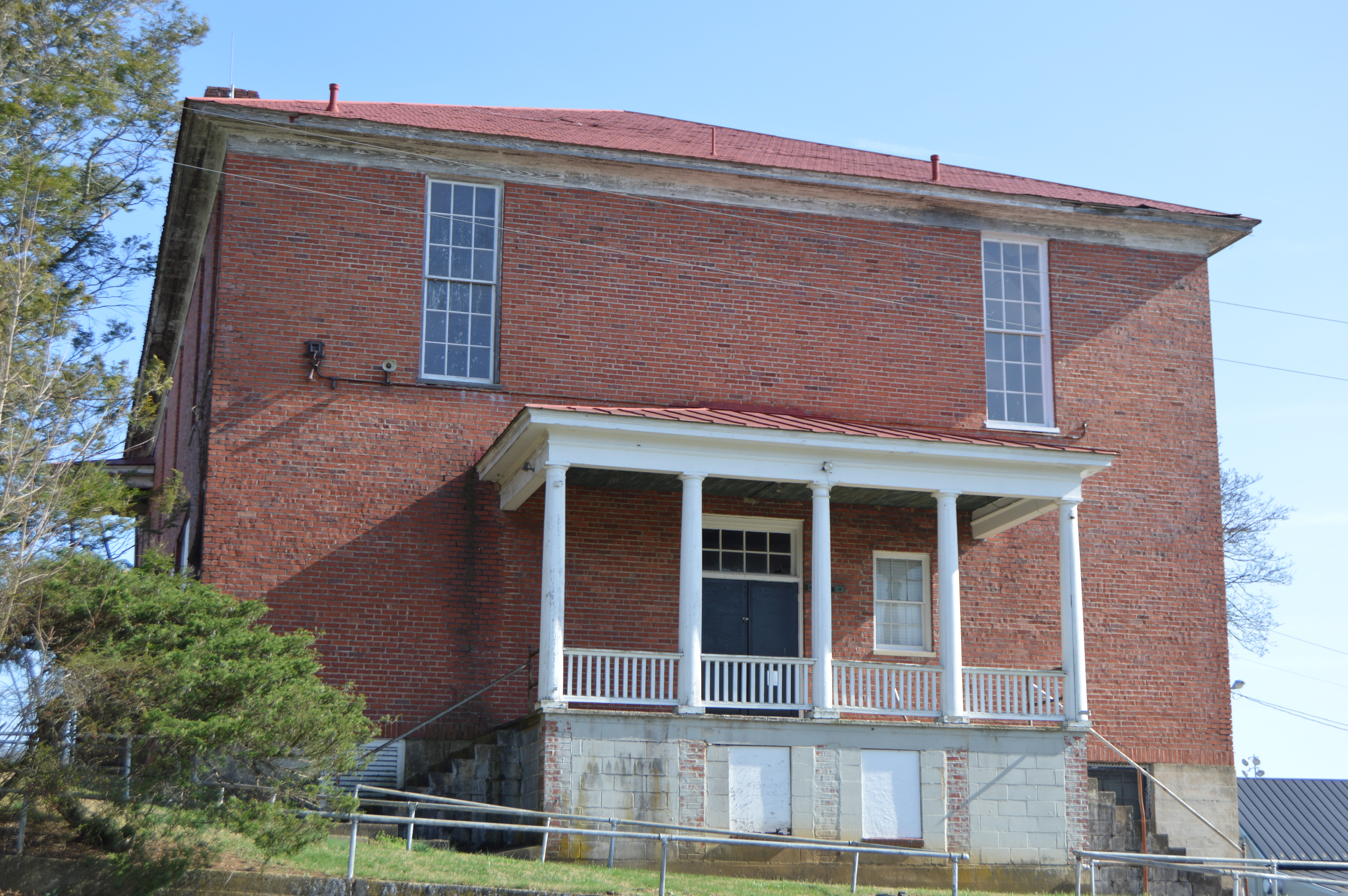
High school
