= Summerdean, Virginia =

Unincorporated community in Virginia, United States

- Unincorporated community
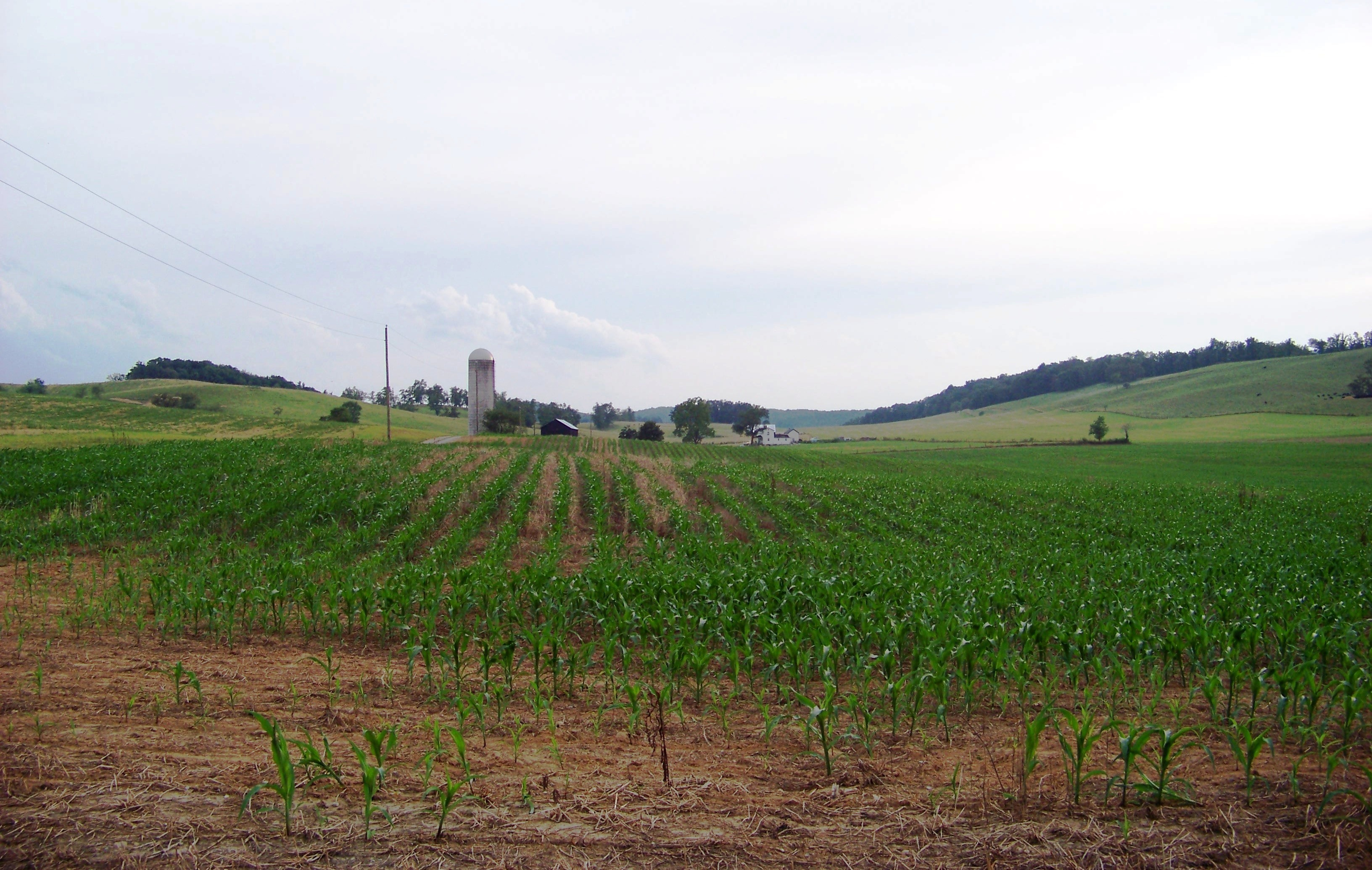
- Farm country south of Summerdean

- Location within Virginia Location within the United States
- Coordinates: 38°04′30″N 79°15′22″W
- Country: United States
- State: Virginia
- County: Augusta
- Elevation: 1,759 ft (536 m)
- Time zone: UTC−5 (Eastern (EST))
  - Summer (DST): UTC−4 (EDT)
- Area code: 540
- GNIS feature ID: 1487726

Summerdean is an unincorporated community in Augusta County, Virginia, United States. Summerdean is located at the junction of State Routes 602 and 603, 11.3 miles (18.2 km) west-southwest of Staunton. The Glebe Schoolhouse, which is listed on the National Register of Historic Places, is located near Summerdean.
