= Estaline Schoolhouse =

- U.S. National Register of Historic Places
- Virginia Landmarks Register
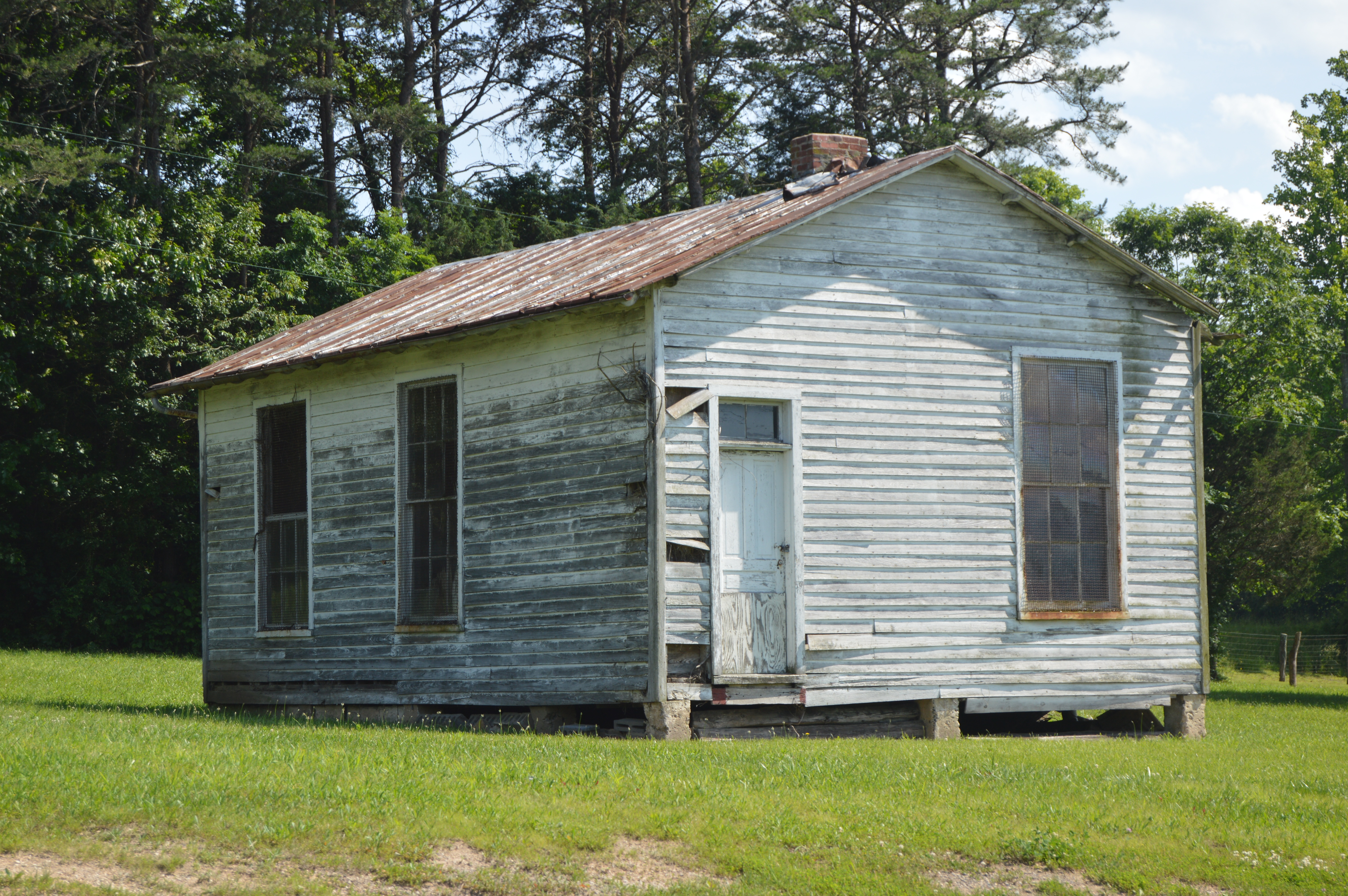
- Front and northeastern side

- Location within Virginia Location within the United States
- Location: Estaline Valley Road, Estaline Valley, Virginia
- Coordinates: 38°3′45″N 79°21′27″W
- Area: 1 acre (0.40 ha)
- Built: 1909
- MPS: Public Schools in Augusta County Virginia 1870-1940 TR
- NRHP reference No.: 85000385
- VLR No.: 007-0524

Significant dates
- Added to NRHP: February 27, 1985
- Designated VLR: December 11, 1984

Estaline Schoolhouse is a historic one-room school building located at Estaline Valley, Augusta County, Virginia. The schoolhouse is a one-story, rectangular frame building with a gable roof. Constructed in 1909, it was one of the last one-room schoolhouses built in the county. The school closed soon after World War II. As of 2023 the building has fallen into disrepair and the roof has collapsed.

It was listed on the National Register of Historic Places in 1985.

== History and description ==
The Estaline Schoolhouse was built in 1909. "Grace and Charles Curry sold the schoolhouse and lot to the School Board on April 18, 1912, although the deed noted that the property "has been occupied and used by said party of the second part as school property since the Fall of 1909." The design and date of this schoolhouse are identical to Wallace's Mill Schoolhouse, also located in the Estaline Valley. The school was one of the last one-room schoolhouses to close in the county due to the immense local popularity of its teacher. The school closed soon after World War II and students were bused to Craigsville. The county rented the school for many years before selling the property in 1974."

"The schoolhouse illustrates the development of the one-room form by the twentieth century. The school retains the familiar rectangular gable entry form, measuring 31 by 21 feet (9.4 by 6.4 m), of frame construction and underpinned on concrete piers. The five-panel door with transom light is displaced to one end of the facade with a window to the other side. The 6-over-6 sash windows are much larger than those found in the late nineteenth century, reflecting a concern for better lighting and ventilation. Carved eave brackets provide more decoration than was uusually found on earlier schools."
