= Augusta County Training School =

- U.S. National Register of Historic Places
- Virginia Landmarks Register
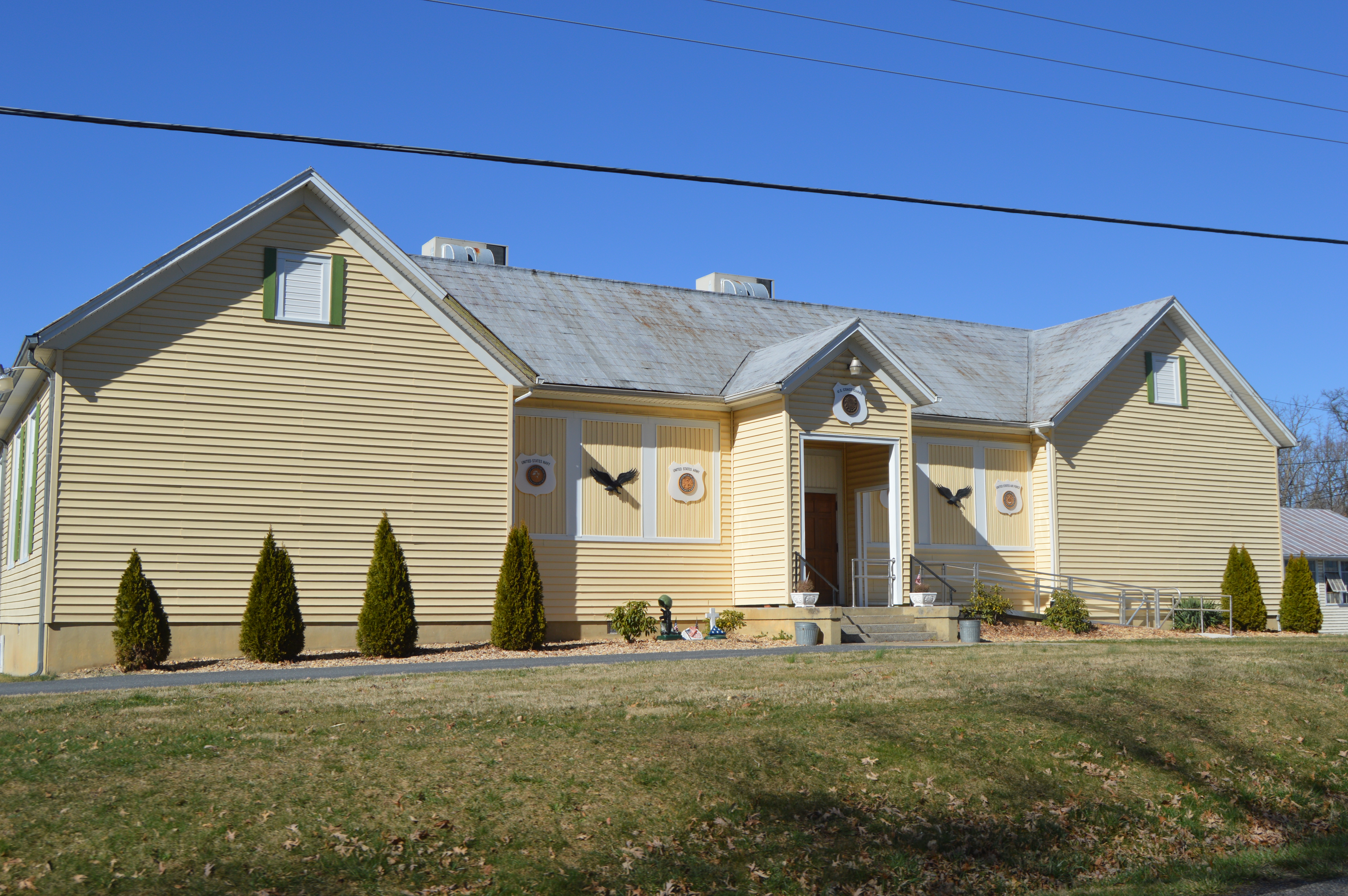
- Front of the school

- Location within Virginia Location within the United States
- Location: Cedar Green Rd., Cedar Green, Virginia
- Coordinates: 38°8′49″N 79°7′54″W
- Area: 2.3 acres (0.93 ha)
- Built: 1938
- Architect: G.G. Shaver and Kellis Bibb
- Architectural style: Classical Revival, Vernacular Neo-Classical
- MPS: Public Schools in Augusta County Virginia 1870-1940 TR
- NRHP reference No.: 86001400
- VLR No.: 007-0755

Significant dates
- Added to NRHP: June 19, 1986
- Designated VLR: December 11, 1984

Augusta County Training School, originally known as Cedar Green School, is a historic public school building located at Cedar Green, Augusta County, Virginia, built in 1938. It was the first consolidated school larger than two rooms built for African-American students in Augusta County. The American Legion purchased the building in 1966 and remodeled it for their lodge.

It was listed on the National Register of Historic Places in 1986.

== History and description ==
Augusta County had been consolidating white one- and two-room schools into larger facilities since the 1910s, but an equivalent facility for blacks was not built until 1938. The Training School was intended to house all of the black students in the county in grades 1 through 10 in one school with student proceeding to a segregated high school in Staunton, to complete their education. The concept for a facility focused on industrial education for blacks was developed in the 1910s, but only token efforts were made to maintain that ideal which had been seriously compromised in subsequent decades. The Training School only offered industrial classes in carpentry and similar subjects with a little agriculture and home economics. The school lacked some of the facilities, including a library, standard in white schools.

This classically based schoolhouse design was used widely in Virginia in the early twentieth century, although the design was modified by county employees to use framing rather than a brick veneer. The school was one of the last such buildings constructed in the county; much of the land and labor used was contributed by local blacks. The structure is a one-story, central-auditorium plan, frame building with projecting classroom wings on each side of a recessed auditorium. It features a projecting-entrance portico and steeply pitched roof in a vernacular Neo-Classical style.
