= Hannah Miller House =

Historic house in Virginia, United States

- U.S. National Register of Historic Places
- Virginia Landmarks Register
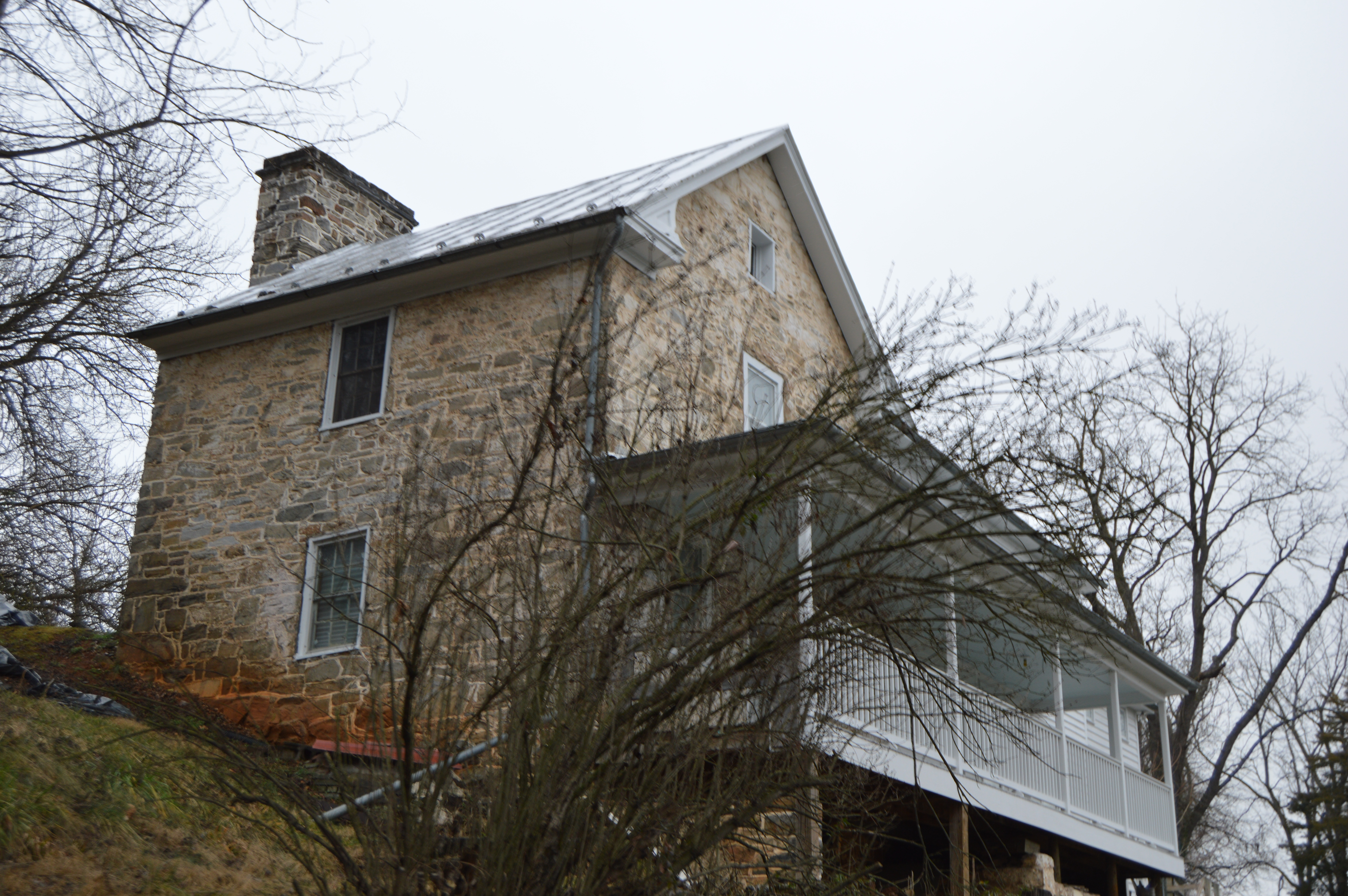
- Front and southern side

- Location within Virginia Location within the United States
- Location: North of Mossy Creek off VA 747, near Mossy Creek, Virginia
- Coordinates: 38°21′34″N 79°1′46″W
- Area: 0.8 acres (0.32 ha)
- Built: c. 1814
- Architectural style: "Continental bank" house
- NRHP reference No.: 79003028
- VLR No.: 007-0269

Significant dates
- Added to NRHP: May 24, 1979
- Designated VLR: December 19, 1978

Hannah Miller House, also known as the William Joseph House, is a historic home located near Mossy Creek, Augusta County, Virginia. It was built about 1814, and is a two-story, banked stone "Continental bank" house style dwelling. It sits on a full, but not fully excavated, basement and has an exterior stone chimney. As of 1978, the interior of the house was absolutely plain and little-altered, with a single room on each floor.

It was listed on the National Register of Historic Places in 1978.
