= Hush Kids =

American indie folk/alt-country band

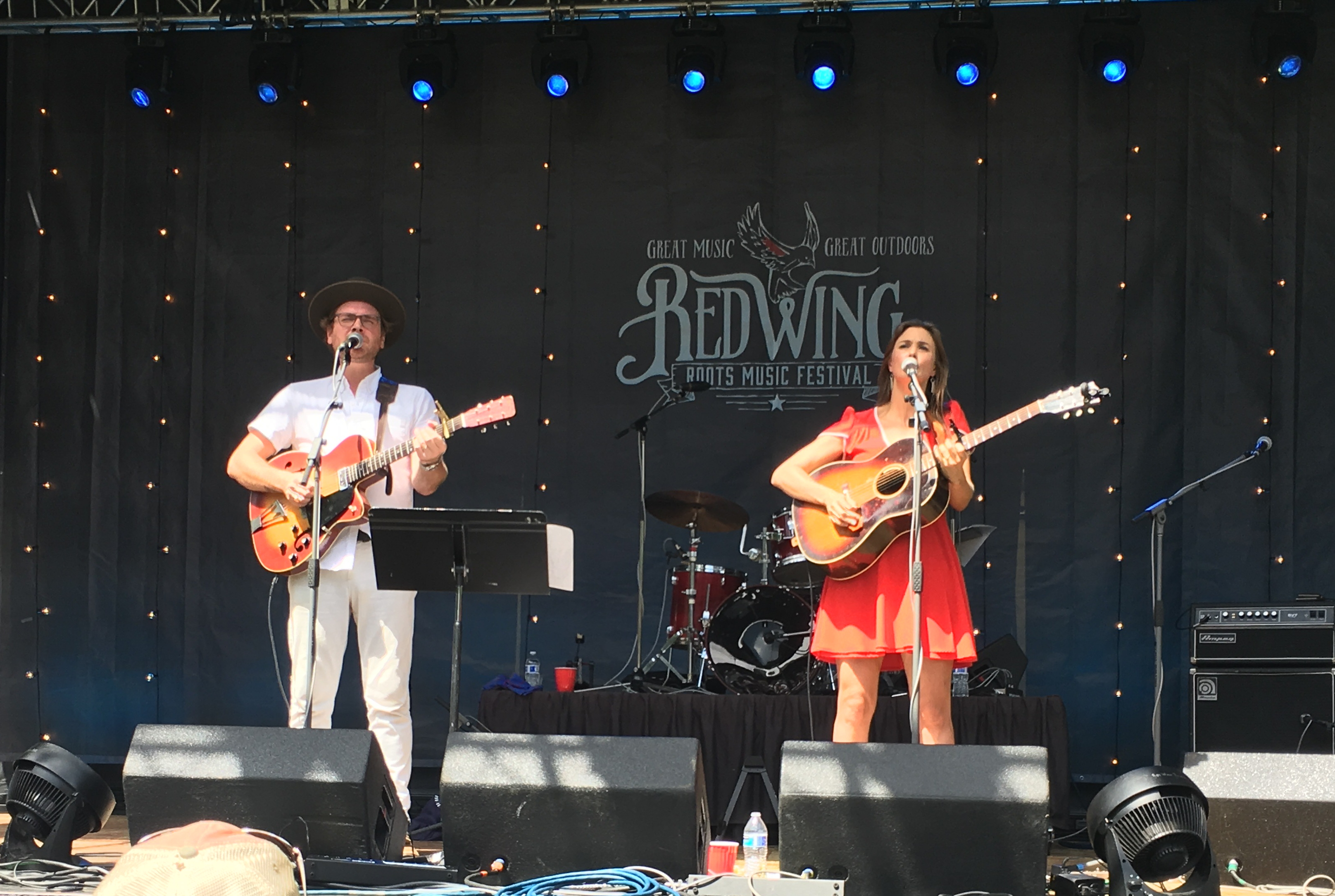
- Hush Kids performing at Natural Chimneys Regional Park, Mount Solon, Virginia, July 12, 2019

Background information
- Origin: Nashville, Tennessee
- Genres: Alternative country; Indie folk; Roots rock
- Years active: 2018–present
- Members: Jill Andrews; Peter Groenwald

Hush Kids is an American indie folk/alt-country band from Nashville, Tennessee, formed in 2018 by Jill Andrews and Peter Groenwald. The group released a self-titled album on October 26 that was produced by Ian Fitchuk. Hush Kids later released an extended play titled Weatherman on October 1, 2021.

== Career ==
Prior to the duo formation, Andrews and Groenwald had long been known for their personal musical projects, with Andrews as a founding member of The Everybodyfields and Groenwald as a collaborator with various artists like John Mayer and The Civil Wars.

The duo met through their respective publishers in 2014 and have been called the “songwriting blind date that paid off.” Although the union was created a few years later, their first writing session proved fruitful when “What’s Your Hurry” was written. That same song eventually landed on Hush Kids, their self-titled debut album, four years later. Groenwald told Billboard, “Jill was the one who said, 'and we should start a band!' I felt like I couldn't say no, because she clearly has a lot going on and it's her idea to do this. I had to say yes.”

== Members ==
- Jill Andrews (vocals, bass guitar, acoustic guitar)
- Peter Groenwald (vocals, bass guitar, piano)

== Discography ==
- Hush Kids (2018)
