= Red Wing Roots Music Festival =

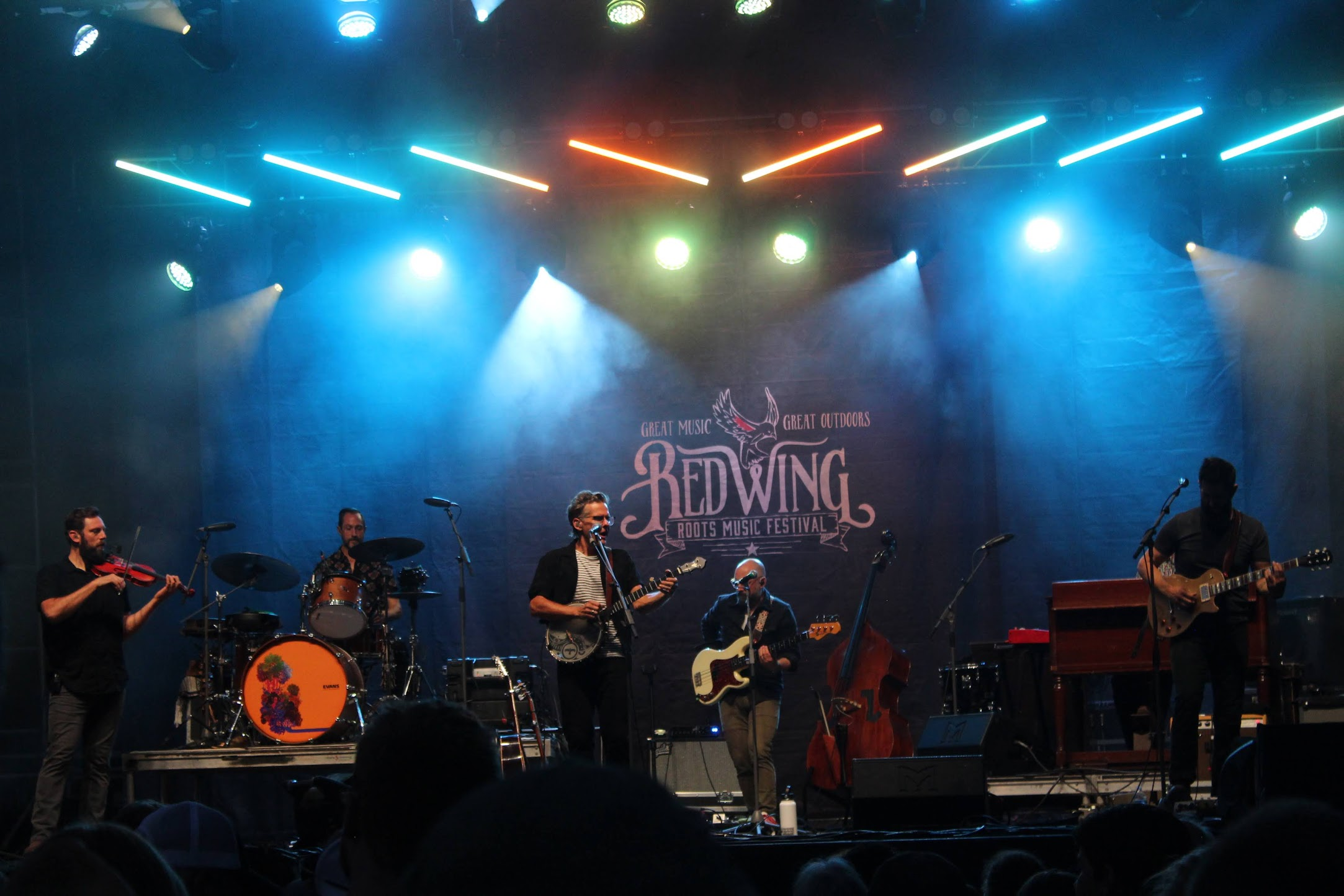
The Steel Wheels performing at Red Wing in 2024

Red Wing (officially Red Wing Roots Music Festival) is an annual music festival held at Natural Chimneys park in Mount Solon, Virginia. Red Wing is hosted by Americana band The Steel Wheels, who co-founded the festival in 2013. Red Wing typically takes place over a weekend in late June, spanning three days, and is a notable visitor attraction in the Shenandoah Valley. The festival features around 50 diverse acts yearly with a focus on Americana, folk, and country music. Musicians perform on one of 5 different stages located in the park. The festival's family-friendly atmosphere attracts a wide demographic of visitors from across the United States. In addition to live music, the festival offers camping, arts and crafts vendors, and food trucks. Notable acts which have performed at Red Wing include Old Crow Medicine Show, Lucinda Williams, Steve Earle, Del McCoury Band, Lake Street Dive, First Aid Kit, Kurt Vile, and Joy Oladokun.

== Name ==
The festival's name comes from The Steel Wheels song "Red Wing" off their 2010 album of the same name. The song is traditionally performed yearly on Saturday night of the festival.

== Red Wing Academy ==
Red Wing Academy is a four-day youth camp hosted by Eric Brubaker of The Steel Wheels, in which students are taught how to play various songs (on violin, viola, cello, bass, guitar, mandolin and banjo) which are then performed with the band during Red Wing. The Red Wing Academy practices at Eastern Mennonite University in Harrisonburg, Virginia.
