= Jill Andrews =

American singer-songwriter (born 1980)

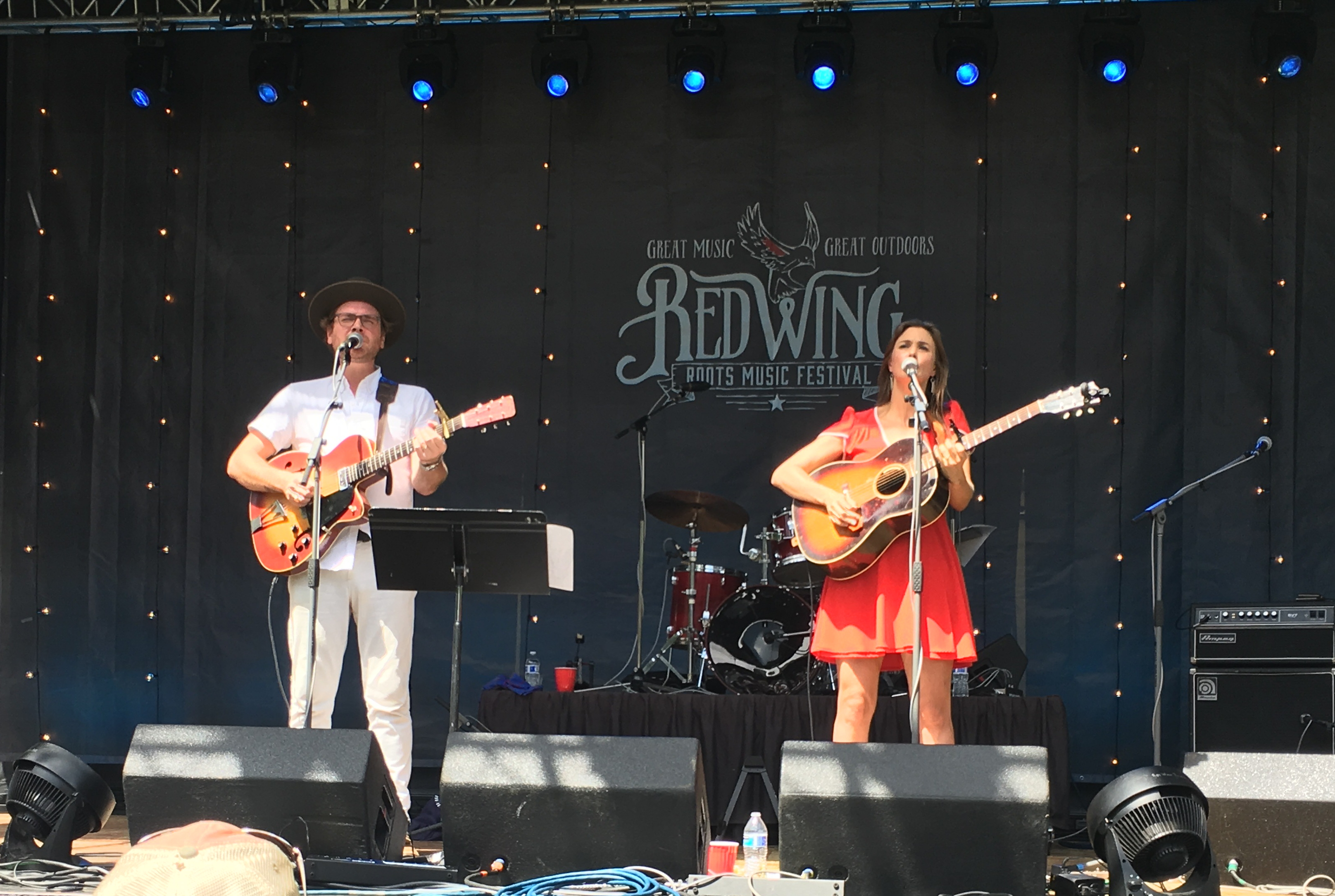
- Hush Kids performing at Natural Chimneys Regional Park, Mount Solon, Virginia in July 2019

Background information
- Birth name: Jill Ellen Andrews
- Born: May 23, 1980 (age 45); Normal, Illinois, U.S.
- Genres: Alternative country; bluegrass; indie folk; pop; roots rock
- Occupations: Singer-songwriter; musician
- Instruments: Vocals; guitar
- Years active: 2004–present
- Labels: Vulture Vulture; Liam Records; Dualtone Records
- Website: jillandrews.com

Jill Ellen Andrews (born May 23, 1980) is an American singer-songwriter based in Nashville, Tennessee. She co-founded the indie folk/alt-country band The Everybodyfields, leaving in 2009 to pursue a solo career. In 2018, she co-founded the duo Hush Kids with Peter Groenwald.

Songs by Andrews have been featured in several television series, among them: "Tell That Devil", co-written with Emery Dobyns and Matthew Mayfield, was performed by Hayden Panettiere in Nashville and is the theme song for Wynonna Earp; "Lost It All", co-written with Matthew Bronleewe, was included in Teen Wolf and The Originals; and "Rust or Gold", co-written with Elise Hayes, in Grey's Anatomy and Beauty & the Beast. "Rust or Gold" was released as a single concurrent with its debut on Grey's Anatomy and within two days ranked in the top ten of iTunes' Singer/Songwriter chart.

== Early life ==
Andrews was born in Normal, Illinois and brought up in Johnson City, Tennessee. She is an alumna of East Tennessee State University.

== Career ==
Andrews began writing songs when she was 19 years old and her music career began in 2004 when she co-founded the alt-country group The Everybodyfields. In October 2009, only four months after The Everybodyfields break-up was announced, Andrews put together a new band and released a self-titled EP. The six-song EP was produced by Andrews and recorded live to 8-track by producer/engineer Scott Minor in his home studio.

While Andrews toured the country in 2010 to promote her EP she recorded her first solo album, The Mirror. In order to fund the release of the album, Andrews used Kickstarter to raise over $12,000 with the help of 279 backers. The record had two producers, Scott Solter and Neilson Hubbard; each recording tracks at two different studios in North Carolina and Nashville, respectively.

On September 25, 2015, Andrews released her second full-length album, The War Inside. The album was produced by Will Sayles. The track "I'm So in Love With You" features Seth Avett of The Avett Brothers.

Andrews released her EP, Ellen on October 29, 2021, which features six never-released tracks that harken back to her beginnings as a new songwriter in Nashville.

In 2018, Andrews and Peter Groenwald started the indie-folk duo, Hush Kids. The group released a self-titled album on October 26 that was produced by Ian Fitchuk. The duo reunited with Fitchuk in 2021 to release their latest EP, Weatherman.

In 2023, Andrews released her fifth studio album Modern Age. The album was produced by Lucas Morton.

== Personal life ==
Andrews has two children: son Nico, and daughter Falcon.

== Discography ==
=== Albums ===
- Jill Andrews EP (2009)
- The Mirror (2011)
- The War Inside (2015)
- Gimme the Beat Back EP (2020)
- Thirties (2020)
- Vultures EP (2021)
- Ellen EP (2021)
- Modern Age (2023)

==== Featured ====
- Youth Is in Our Blood – The Dirty Guv'nahs (2010)

Track 9: "The Country"

- 100 Miles of Wreckage – The Black Lillies (2011)

Track 2: "The Arrow"

- The Art of Troublesome Times – Don Gallardo (2012)

Track 5: "Bluebird"

- Cayamo Sessions at Sea – Buddy Miller & Friends (2016)

Track 9: "Come Early Mornin' "

- Often in the Pause (Covers and Remixes) – Kris Orlowski (2016)

Track 9: "Carry Your Weight"

- Pure Country: Pure Heart (Soundtrack) (2017)

Track 14: "Something Calling My Name"

=== Singles ===
- "Rust or Gold" (2013)
- "Total Eclipse of the Heart" (2013)
- "We Built This City" (with Aron Wright) (2014)
- "Can't Be Love" (2015)
- "Get Up, Get On" (2015)
- "The End of Everything" (2015)
- "Sea of Love" (with Langhorne Slim) (2016)
- "Lost It All" (2016)
- "Siren Song" (2016)
- "A Way to You Again" (2016)
- "Tell That Devil" (2016)
- "Jingle Your Bells" (with Peter Groenwald) (2016)
- "Safe" (2017)
- "Sorry Now" (2019)
- "Forces" (2019)
- "The Party" (2019)
- "The Only Flaw of Love" (2019)
- "Back Together" (2020)
- "River Swimming" (2020)
- "The Kids Are Growing Up" (2020)
- "Walking Wounded" (2021)
- "Cloud Chaser" (2021)
- "Answers" (2021)
- "Vultures" (2021)
- "Drive Away With You" (2021)
- "Eye to Eye" (2021)
- "The Blues Have Blown Away" (2021)
- "Sanctuary (The Parthenon Sessions)" (2022)

=== Hush Kids ===
- Hush Kids (2018)
- Weatherman EP (2021)

== See also ==
- List of people from Tennessee
- List of singer-songwriters
