= Nothing Is Okay =

Studio album by The Everybodyfields
- Released: August 21, 2007
- Genres: Folk; Country
- Length: 52:21
- Label: Ramseur Records

The Everybodyfields chronology
Plague of Dreams (2005)	Nothing Is Okay (2007)

Professional ratings
Review scores
Source	Rating
AllMusic	4/5 stars
American Songwriter	4

Nothing is Okay is the third and final album by The Everybodyfields, co-founded and fronted by Sam Quinn and Jill Andrews. The album was released August 21, 2007.

== Critical reception ==
Hal Horowitz of AllMusic concluded his review with, "Surely this isn't for parties, unless it's a pity party, yet there is a calming poignancy generated by the combination of gorgeous harmonies and exquisite songs that is hypnotic and quietly captivating."

Robin Aigner of American Songwriter wrote, "Nothing Is Okay is yet another indie release that is wiser and wittier than anything you're likely to hear on the FM, with hooks far tastier than the gruel they're force-feeding on the MTV."

Rachael Maddux of Paste Magazine concluded with, "Sometimes love don't feel like it should, but who's to say what's right or wrong with sadness this divine?"

Jason Gonulsen of Glide Magazine review stated, "The truth is that the everybodyfields make it and play it like no other band I have heard in quite a long time."

== Track listing ==
All tracks are written by Jill Andrews and Sam Quinn except for "Wasted Time" by Jill & Megan McCormick.

No.	Title	Length
1.	"Aeroplane"	3:27
2.	"Lonely Anywhere"	5:45
3.	"Don't Tern Around"	3:17
4.	"Leaving Today"	2:53
5.	"Be Miner"	3:40
6.	"Savior"	3:17
7.	"Birthday"	2:52
8.	"Wasted Time"	4:09
9.	"Everything Is Okay"	2:37
10.	"Tuesday"	3:04
11.	"Over and Done"	4:06
12.	"Out On The Highway"	13:14
13.	"Worker's Playtime" (See extended note below)
Total length:		52:21

- "Worker's Playtime" is a hidden track which plays after "Out On The Highway" ends. It is an extended version of the theme song of the WQFS radio show of the same name hosted by Kathy Clark.

== Personnel ==
- Jill Andrews - Vocals, bass, guitar
- Sam Quinn - Vocals, bass, guitar
- Megan McCormick - Guitars, lap steel, vocals
- Megan Gregory - Fiddle
- Josh Oliver - Keys
- Travis Kammeyer - Drums
