= Running at the ring =

Equestrian sport derived from jousting

Running at the ring, riding at the ring or tilting at the ring is an equestrian tournament activity originally practiced at European royal courts and likely derived from other lance games like quintain. It gained new popularity at Natural Chimneys near Mount Solon, Virginia, possibly as early as the 1820s, and since 1962, has been the state sport of Maryland. A similar contest, the corrida de sortija, is held in Argentina where it is considered a gaucho sport derived from the Spanish tradition of medieval tournaments.

== Description ==
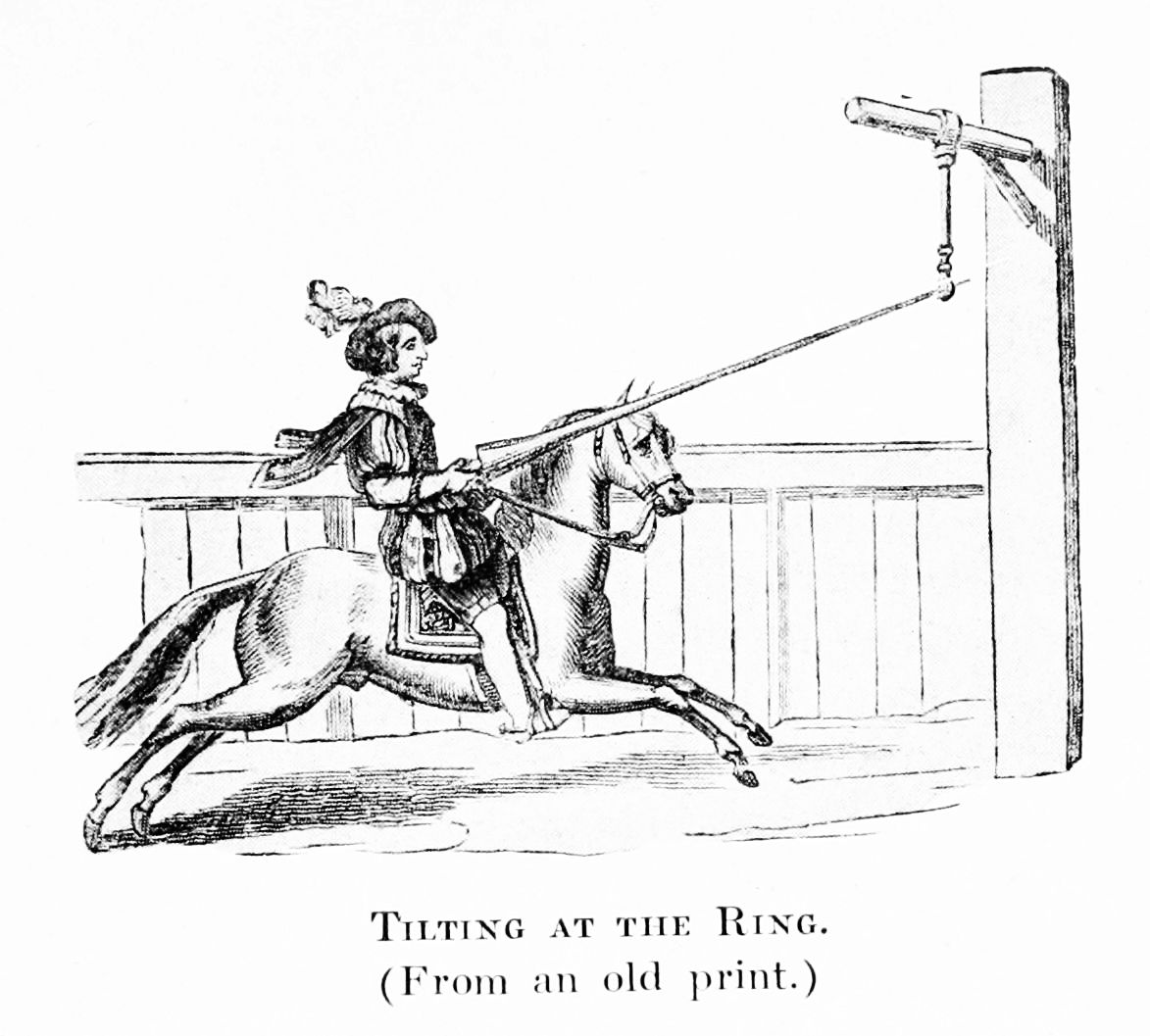
Running or tilting at the ring, an illustration derived from L'Instruction du Roy en l'exercise de monter a cheval by Antoine de Pluvinel

Participants rode at full speed to thrust the point of the lance through a ring or to hook a ring and carry it off. A performer was allowed three attempts. The French author and riding master Antoine de Pluvinel published descriptions and the rules. The lance was shorter than those used for jousting, and had no protective vamplate.

=== Costumed court festival ===
This version of a lance game or quintain could be played in teams, and the riders sometimes dressed in exotic fancy costume as a spectacle at weddings or other court festivals. Costumes for a 1570 tournament in Prague were designed by Giuseppe Arcimboldo. At Munich in February 1568, at a match held at the wedding of Renata of Lorraine and William V, Duke of Bavaria, the spectators were entertained by the costumed aristocratic riders and professional Italian comedians. Henry of Navarre bought steel rings and painted lances for a masquerade in 1576. There are many records of running at the ring at the Scottish and Tudor courts. At court, the prize was often a diamond ring presented by a lady.

=== Present day sport ===
A tournament of tilting at the ring continues to be held in Denmark at Sønderborg annually in July and the Ringridermuseet is dedicated to the sport. It is also a tradition to have variations of this game at summer get-togethers in small Danish villages. Here they will often use anything but a horse, such as bike, lawnmower, tractor or even other people. Modern ring tilting tournaments have also been held in Croatian Istria since at least the 1970s.. It is also practised in the province of Zeeland, The Netherlands.

Running at the ring, usually referred to as a ring tournament, ring jousting, or simply as jousting, has been practiced in parts of the American South since at least the 1840s. Ring tournaments are still held in Virginia, West Virginia, North Carolina, and South Carolina, but most frequently in Maryland, where tilting has survived since the founding of the original colony. In 1962 Maryland made this form of jousting its state sport2.

== Tudor tournaments ==
Costume fabrics for Henry VIII of England to run at the ring at Greenwich Palace in January and February 1516 included velvets, damasks, satins, and sarcenets. He performed at Richmond Palace for the Venetian ambassador in May 1517. It was said that Anne Boleyn was frightened when Henry fell from his horse while running at the ring, and this caused her miscarriage.

In February 1547, English soldiers at Boulogne held a tournament to celebrate the coronation of Edward VI. Instead of tilting, they held courses of running at the ring. One team of six were dressed "like Turks". John Dudley, 1st Duke of Northumberland wagered and lost a valuable velvet cap to Jakes Granado, running at the ring at Westminster Palace on 6 June 1550. Jacques Granado and his brother Bernardine were Squires of the Stable to Edward VI.

Edward VI took part in April and May 1551, riding against Edward Seymour, the King's team wore black silk coats "pulled out" with white, the challengers wore yellow taffeta. Edward VI rode again at Greenwich in 1552. Roger Ascham wrote that to "run fair at the tilt or ring" was one of the necessary skills "for a courtier to use".

When the French ambassador, Gilles de Noailles, came to see Elizabeth I at West Horsley Place in Surrey in August 1559, they watched Robert Dudley, Master of the Horse, and other courtiers running at the ring from a window: Noailles wrote:

d'alla asseoir prés d'une fenestre, au devant de laquelle son Grand Escuyer, et dix ou onze autres Gentilshommes se tenoient prestz pour luy donner du plaisir à voir courre la Bague

We sat near a window, below which, nearby, her Great Squire [Dudley], and ten or twelve other courtiers ran at the ring for her pleasure.

In 1655 Edward Somerset, 2nd Marquess of Worcester, included an artificial "ring horse" for running at the ring in his Century of Inventions.

== Scottish records ==
=== Mary, Queen of Scots ===
Mary of Guise, the mother of Mary, Queen of Scots, had a son by her first marriage to the Duke of Longueville, François III d'Orléans, Duke of Longueville. François wrote to Mary of Guise from the Palace of Fontainebleau in January 1548, mentioning his exercises wearing armour and running at the ring, courir la bague. He hoped that by learning these martial skills he would be able to help his mother against her enemies.

In December 1561, René II de Lorraine, Marquis d'Elbeuf, with John Stewart, Commendator of Coldingham, Robert Stewart, 1st Earl of Orkney, and others, performed in tournaments on the sands of Leith, probably to celebrate the birthday of Mary, Queen of Scots. There was running at the ring, with two teams of six men including the French diplomat Paul de Foix, one team dressed as women, the other as exotic foreigners in strange masquing garments. The events, attended by the diplomats Thomas Randolph, were perhaps the first ring tournaments as equestrian masques in Scotland. Randolph wrote of his conversation with Paul de Foix about the first event:

we sett in talke of the pastymes that was Sunday before, where he, Lord Robert, Lord John and others rane at the ringe, 6 against 6, dysguised and appareled th'one half lyke women, and th'other lyke strayngers, in straynge maskinge garmentes. The Marquis that day did verie well, but the women whose part the Lord Roberte dyd sustayne wane the rynge. The Queen herself behylde it and as many others as lyste.

The Count of Moretta attended the "mirth and pastimes" at the second event at Leith on 6 December 1561. Thomas Randolph saw Mary, Queen of Scots, watching running at the ring at the sands of Leith again in March 1565. The contestants included Lord Darnley and Lord Robert. An entertainment written by George Buchanan for the wedding of Mary, Queen of Scots, and Henry, Lord Darnley, the Pompae Equestres, involved the arrival of teams of exotic knights, and may have provided themes for a tournament.

According to Anthony Standen, Lord Darnley organised a tournament of running at the ring to celebrate the birth of Prince James on 19 June 1566. Standen, who was Darnley's Master of Horse, won the prize of a jewel.

In May 1567, following his wedding to Mary, Queen of Scots, James Hepburn, 4th Earl of Bothwell, then known as the Duke of Orkney, ran at the ring at a court festival at the Water of Leith or beside the Firth of Forth. According to William Drury, "there was a triumph upon the water before the Queen and the Duke. The Duke ran at the ring, and the soldiers made some show after the manner of a skirmish".

=== James VI ===
In October 1579, James VI of Scotland took up residence at Holyroodhouse. Sand was brought to lay out a course for running at the ring, under the direction of William MacDowall who had supervised works in the palace garden for three decades. The rings were suspended from a "potence". The lances used may have been hollow and lighter than those used for combat. James ran in a match at the ring with other riders at Dundee on 9 June 1580.

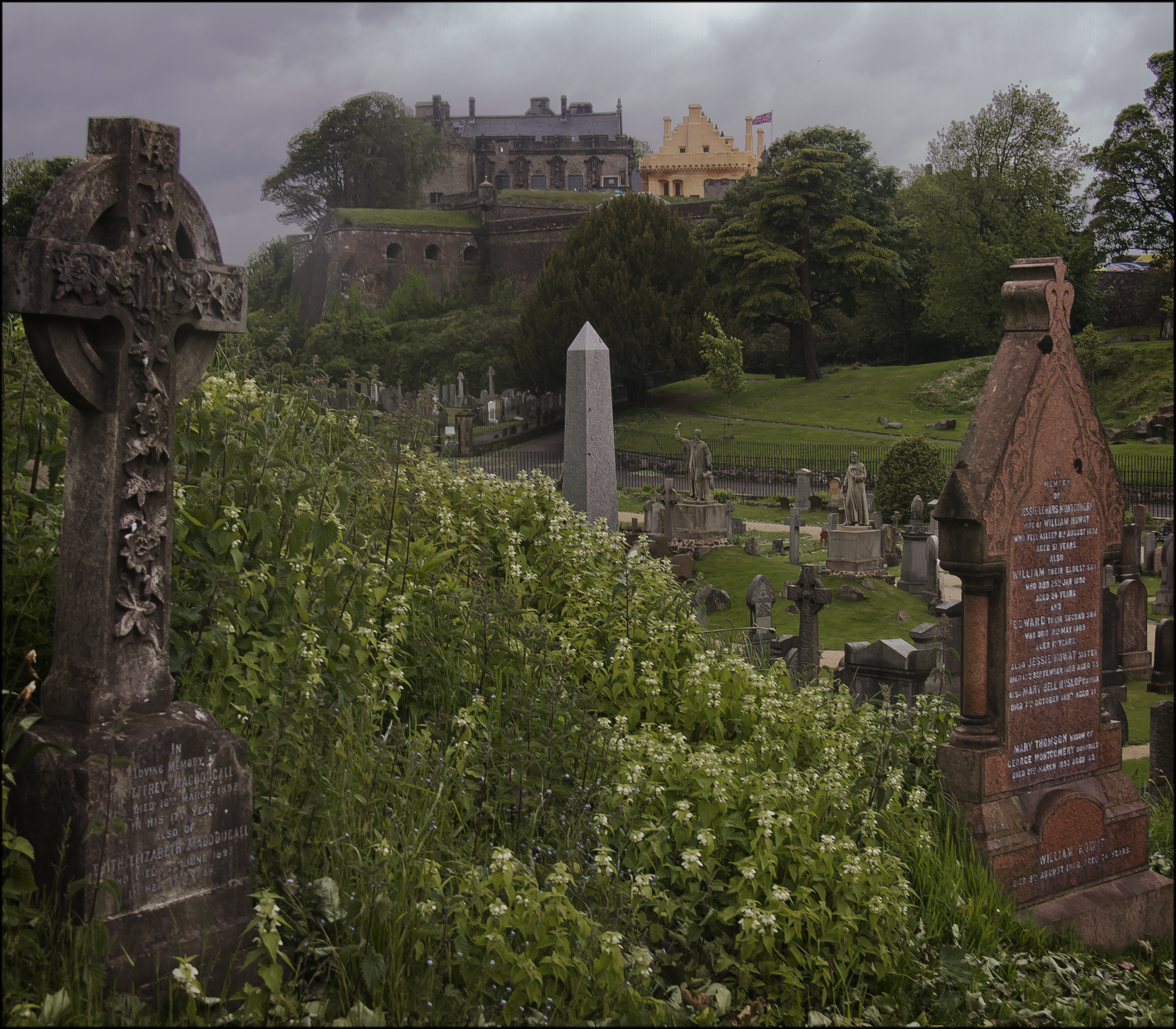
The 1594 tournament at Stirling Castle was held in The Valley to the south of the castle, since 1857 a part of the Old Town Cemetery

Elizabeth Stewart married James Stewart, 2nd Earl of Moray in January 1581. The wedding was celebrated in Fife with a tournament of "running at the ring" and James VI took part in a costume of white satin dressed with silken ribbons. Two day after, the party came to Leith, where a water pageant culminated with an assault on a pasteboard Papal Castel Sant'Angelo, built on boats on the water of Leith. White satin and taffeta outfits, "play claithis", were bought for James VI, his master stabler, and a page. In February 1581 a payment was made for painted spears supplied to James VI and sand delivered to Holyrood to build a course or track called a "carear" or career.

Jousting at the court of James VI was celebrated by the poet Alexander Montgomerie in A Cartell of Thrie Ventrous Knights, which seems to be a pageant prologue for an actual tournament:

To prove thy knights. We dout not bot they dare,
In play or ernest, be bold to brek a tre. (tree = lance)
And so I trou, dare ony of yon thrie:
Bot they are not come heir for sik a thing;
Bot rather, for thair Ladyes sake, to se
Quha fairest runis, and oftest taks the ring.
Go to than, schirs, and let us streik a sting.
Cast crosse or pyle, wha sall begin the play;
And let the luifsume Ladyis and the King
Decerne, as judges, wha dois best, this day.

The Earl of Leicester sent James VI a pied horse, and Roger Aston wrote to him that James rode "right bravely" for a golden ring on 10 June 1580, when six riders challenged all comers during a royal progress at Dundee.

At the baptism of Prince Henry in August 1594 at Stirling Castle, there were three teams of riders. One team was dressed as the Christian Knights of Malta, one in Turkish fashion, and three men dressed as Amazons. A fourth team, to be dressed as Africans called "Moors" did not show up. The event was held in the valley by the castle, where a "carier and scaffold", a course and a grandstand had been built. The events were watched by the queen, Anne of Denmark, with her ladies-in-waiting, and the ambassadors. The audience was swelled by a large crowd of young men from Edinburgh armed with muskets.

The "Christian Knights" were James VI; the Earl of Mar; and Thomas Erskine of Gogar. The "Turks" were the Duke of Lennox; Lord Home; and Sir Robert Kerr of Cessford. The "Amazons" were the Lord Lindores as Penthesilea; the Laird of Buccleuch; and the Abbot of Holyroodhouse. These all bore devices or imprese pertaining to the themes of the festival. Anne of Denmark gave diamond rings to the victors.

The rules of the Stirling tournament were:

1. That all the persons of this pastime compere masked, and in such Order as they come into the Field, so to run out all their courses.
2. That None use any other Ring but that which is put up: and use no other Lance but that which they have brought for themselves
3. He that twice touches the Ring, or stirs it, winneth as muche as if he carried away the ring
4. He that lets his lance fall out of his hand is deprived of all the rest of his courses
5. That every one run with loose reins, and with as much speed as his horse hath
6. That none after his Race, in up-taking of his Horse, lay his Lance upon his shoulder, under the pain of losse of that which he hath done in his course
7. He that carrieth not his Lance under his arme, loseth his course
8. That none, until his three courses be ended, change his horse, if he be not hurt, or upon some other consideration moved to change him.

Some people were not pleased at the idea of the king and his companions dressed as the Catholic "Knights of the Holy Spirit". The intended interpretation was perhaps that the knights would be seen as Protestants overcoming "Turks" who represented the Catholic church.

=== Ring and glove ===
There was running at the ring and at the glove at the baptism of Princess Margaret at Holyrood Palace in April 1598. Spears were bought for James VI to run at the ring and "run at the glove" at Perth in August 1601.

== Jacobean court ==
After the Union of the Crowns, in January 1604, a "standing" was built for Anne of Denmark to watch running at the ring at Hampton Court. The courtier Roger Wilbraham wrote a summary of his impressions of the entertainments at court in January 1604, including the masque of The Vision of the Twelve Goddesses and ruuning at the ring;

King James was at his court at Hampton, where the French, Spanish, and Polonian ambassadors were severallie solemplie feasted, many plaies & daunces with swordes, one mask by English & Scottish lords, another by the Queen's Maiestie & eleven more ladies of her chamber presenting giftes as goddesses. These maskes, especially the laste, costes £2000 or £3000, the aparells, rare musick, fine songes, and in jewels most riche £20,000, the least to my judgment, & [jewels for] her Majestie £100,000, after Christmas was running at the ring by the King & 8 or 9 lords for the honour of those goddesses & then they all feasted together privatelie.

Some of the events involved George Buck, Master of the Revels. James VI and I competed with his brother-in-law Christian IV of Denmark at running at the ring at Theobalds in August 1606.

=== Henry and Elizabeth ===
Prince Henry competed at running at the ring with foreign visitors and diplomats including Louis Frederick, Duke of Württemberg-Montbéliard in April and May 1610. In April 1612, Henry lost and the winner auctioned the prize (a jewel worth 500 crowns) as a valentine among seven ladies of the court. Thomas Somerset was involved in a riding accident while running at the ring at Whitehall Palace in May 1612. His horse trampled the governor of Henri, Duke of Thouars, a companion of the Duke of Boullion.

On Monday 15 February 1613, after the wedding of Princess Elizabeth and Frederick V of the Palatinate there was a tournament of tilting and running at the ring at Whitehall. Anne of Denmark, Elizabeth, and aristocratic women watched from the Banqueting House. King James rode first. Prince Charles did particularly well. The performances of expert riders were appreciated for taking the ring with "much strangeness".

=== Prince Charles and Newmarket ===
George Carleton, newly appointed as a chaplain in the household of Prince Charles in February 1615, praised his skill at riding and running at the ring. There was running at the ring at the creation of the future Charles I as Prince of Wales in November 1616 at Whitehall Palace. Lady Anne Clifford wrote that there "was not half so great pomp as there was at the creation of Prince Henry" in 1610.

Provisions were made for Prince Charles to practice running at the ring at Newmarket Palace. In 1616, great posts were set up in the stable close "for managing of great horses to run at the ring". In 1622, a high stool was made with steps "for the prince to run at the ring".

=== Carpet knights ===
According to Henry Wotton, Robert Drury practiced running at ring and displayed his dressage skills by curvetting his horse in view of King James' window in May 1613. Drury's efforts were intended to secure his appointment as ambassador at Brussels.

Philip Massinger in his play The Maid of Honour wrote of "carpet knights" who "thought to charge, through dust and blood, an armed foe, Was but like graceful running at the ring". William Cavendish, 1st Duke of Newcastle built a magnificent riding school and stable at Bolsover Castle. As a young man he had frequently taken part in equestrian sports and running at the ring at the royal court.

== Spanish match ==
The Spanish word for running at the ring was sortija. There were tournaments including running at ring in Madrid in 1623 when Prince Charles visited in pursuit of his Spanish match. News from Spain was brought to the English court at Theobalds by Richard Graham, Master of Horse. After his Royal Entry to Madrid, Charles and the Marquess of Buckingham were invited to view the course from a high window with Philip III of Spain and his sister. When they went down to take part themselves, Charles saw the Infanta Maria Anna of Spain for the second time, watching his run from the same window. He "took away" the ring, and was the only successful rider that day. The early biographer of James VI and I, Arthur Wilson, includes a brief version of the same story.

== American tradition ==
The American adoption of the ring tournament is not well documented. One of the few known instances of colonial-era jousting was organized by John André as part of the 1778 Mischianza held in Philadelphia to honor the British Commander-in-Chief William Howe. By the mid-19th century, however, jousting was well known in the South with New York Tribune editor Horace Greeley quipping in 1870 that, "the tournament is a natural institution of the South as much as base-ball is of the North or cricket of England". This popularity of jousting in the South is sometimes connected to the popularity of Walter Scott's novel Ivanhoe, which was widely read in the American South.

The first recorded tournament in American happened in 1840, 20 years after Ivanhoe's publication, at the Fauquier White Sulphur Springs resort. The inspiration for this tournament, which advertised tilting at the rings as part of the year's new entertainment, was the 1839 Eglinton Tournament, which in turn was inspired by Ivanhoe. The Fauquier tournament was held annually until 1860 and similar jousts spread across the South during that time.

The enthusiasm has been described as a "mania for spearing rings" which "spread rapidly across the antebellum South". Mark Twain wrote of a "Sir Walter disease". After the American Civil War, ring tournaments continued to find favour, including among freedmen.
