= Long Glade Farm =

Historic house in Virginia, United States

- U.S. National Register of Historic Places
- Virginia Landmarks Register
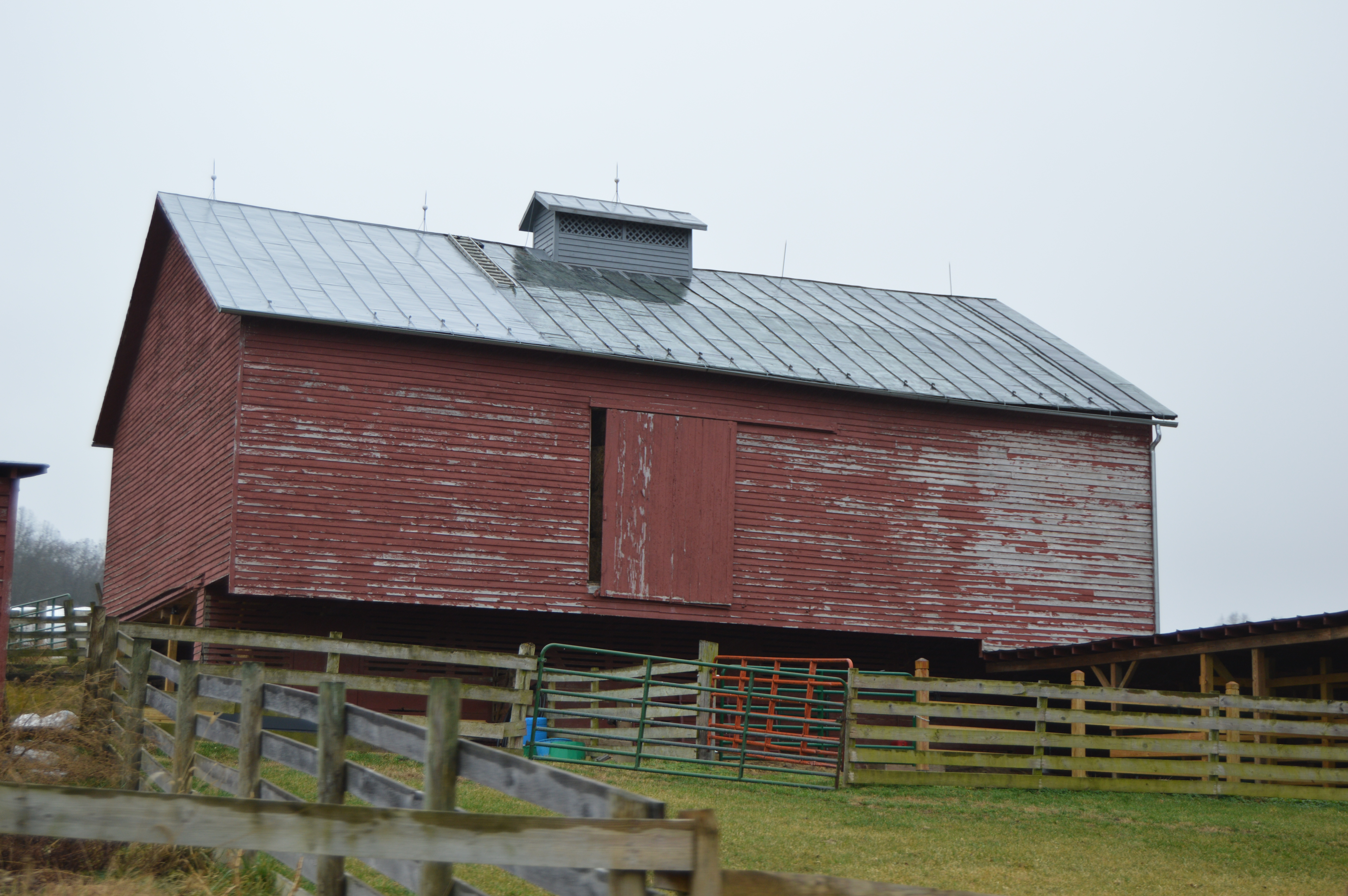
- Barn near the farmhouse

- Location within Virginia Location within the United States
- Location: VA 607, south of the junction with VA 741, near Mount Solon, Virginia
- Coordinates: 38°16′52″N 79°4′20″W
- Area: 104 acres (42 ha)
- Built: 1852
- Architectural style: Greek Revival
- NRHP reference No.: 95001560
- VLR No.: 007-0276

Significant dates
- Added to NRHP: January 22, 1996
- Designated VLR: October 18, 1995

Long Glade Farm, also known as Short Glade Farm and Springdale Farm, is a historic plantation house and farm located near Mount Solon, Augusta County, Virginia. The house was built in 1852, and a two-story, three-bay, "I-house" form brick dwelling in the Greek Revival style. It has an original rear ell. The front facade features a reconstructed front porch with Doric order columns and a balustrade. Also on the property are a contributing meat house, former slaves quarters, a corn crib, a bank barn, a pig house, and a family cemetery.

It was listed on the National Register of Historic Places in 1996.
