= Stokesville Observatory =

Observatory in Virginia, US

- Organization: James Madison University
- Location: Stokesville Campground, Stokesville, Virginia, United States
- Coordinates: 38°21′8.5″N 79°9′7″W

Telescopes
- unnamed: Celestron Compustar Telescope 14 inch reflector

Stokesville Observatory is an astronomical observatory owned by H. D. Riddleberger of Harrisonburg, VA. It is located in Stokesville Campground in Stokesville near Mount Solon, Virginia. The location is adjacent to the George Washington National Forest.

The back of the Stokesville Observatory showing the main tower and the circle of powered piers

The observatory has one 16-foot-diameter (4.9 m) silo-type room housing a 14-inch Celestron Compustar telescope owned by James Madison University under a powered Ash observatory dome. An adjoining shaped room houses astronomy displays and materials used for instructional classes. The building is surrounded by a circle of 8 powered piers for mounting additional telescopes.

The front of Stokesville Observatory tower

== See also ==
- List of observatories
