= Mt. Zion Schoolhouse =

- U.S. National Register of Historic Places
- Virginia Landmarks Register
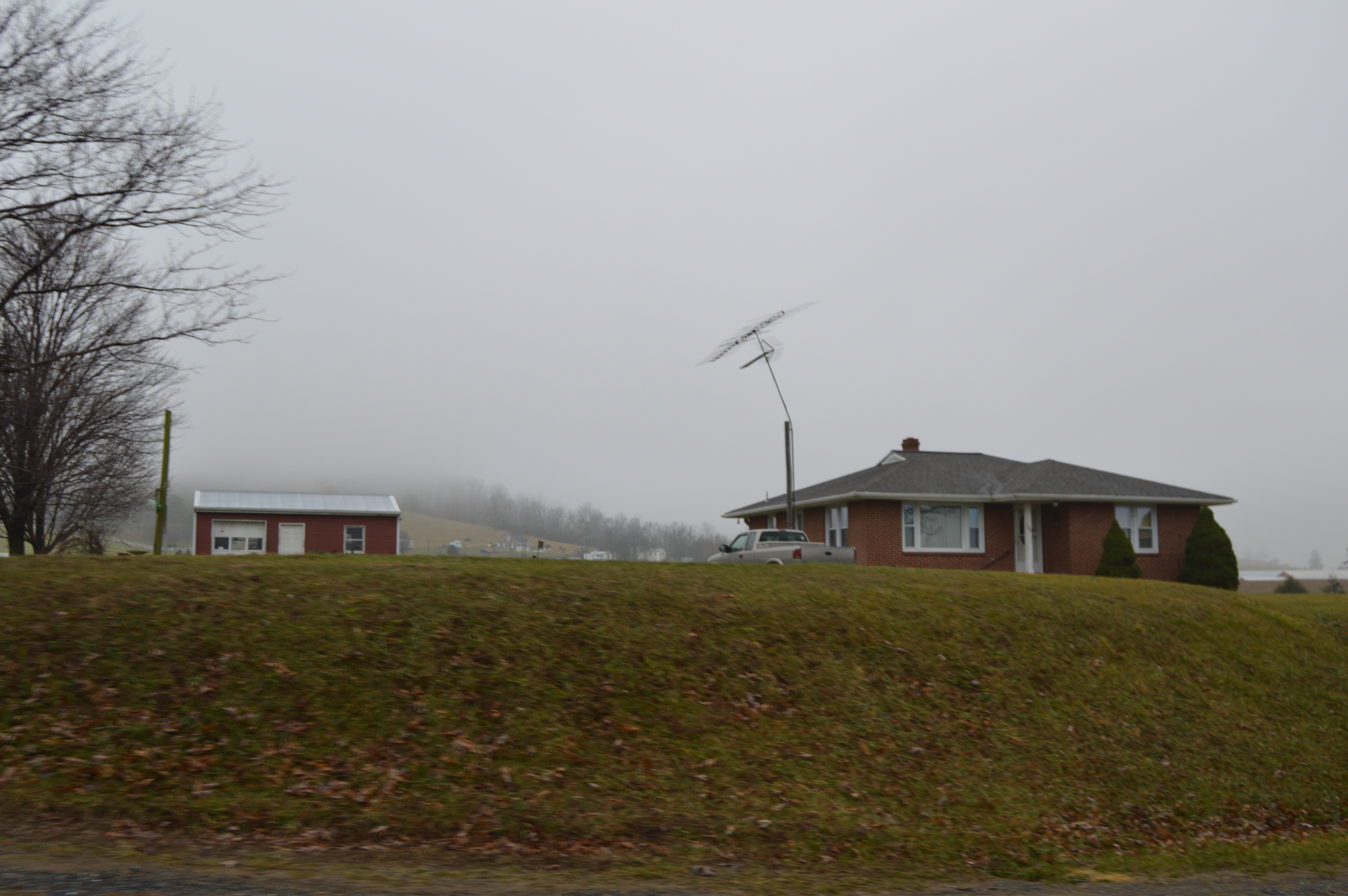
- Site of the schoolhouse

- Location within Virginia Location within the United States
- Location: VA 747, Mount Solon, Virginia
- Coordinates: 38°20′12.1″N 79°7′36.8″W
- Area: 0.5 acres (0.20 ha)
- Built: 1876
- MPS: Public Schools in Augusta County Virginia 1870--1940 TR
- NRHP reference No.: 85000392
- VLR No.: 007-1165

Significant dates
- Added to NRHP: February 27, 1985
- Designated VLR: December 11, 1984

Mt. Zion Schoolhouse was a historic public school building located at Mount Solon, Augusta County, Virginia. Built in 1876, it was a two-room, rectangular frame building topped by a gable roof. It was moved from its original location to a site near Mt. Zion Church before 1915. The schoolhouse was sold in 1948, and remodeled into two apartments.

It was listed on the National Register of Historic Places in 1985.
