= Jacques Granado =

Jacques Granado (died 1557) was a Flemish soldier and a courtier in England.

Granado came from Brabant to England. He was a gentleman pensioner of Henry VIII. He fought in the war with Scotland known as the Rough Wooing, taking part in the battle of Pinkie, where he was involved in chasing, killing, and the capture of Scottish soldiers on Fawsyde Brae before the engagement. He was knighted at Berwick-upon-Tweed on 28 September 1547, or at Newcastle on 1 October.

Jacques Granado and his brother Bernardine (died 1571) were Squires of the Stable to Edward VI.

John Dudley, 1st Duke of Northumberland wagered and lost a valuable velvet cap to "Jakes Granado", in a tournament of running at the ring at Westminster Palace on 6 June 1550. In November 1551 he transported a gift of horses to Henry II of France in Paris. Henry II, Catherine de' Medici, and the Dauphin gave him gold chains.

At Christmas time he performed in a combat in disguise, dressed with the Earl of Ormond as "Almains" (as Germans), and fought Thomas Cobham and Master Drury, who were dressed as friars. His rewards for service included the manor of Newton Sancti Ciricy or Newton St Cyres in Devon.

Granado was killed in a riding accident at Whitehall Palace on 4 May 1557, while performing for Mary I and Philip. He was buried at St Dunstan-in-the-East.

Granado married Magdalen (died 1585). After his death in 1557, she married Sir Robert Chester, and their daughter Katherine Granado married Edward Chester.
