= The Steel Wheels =

American band

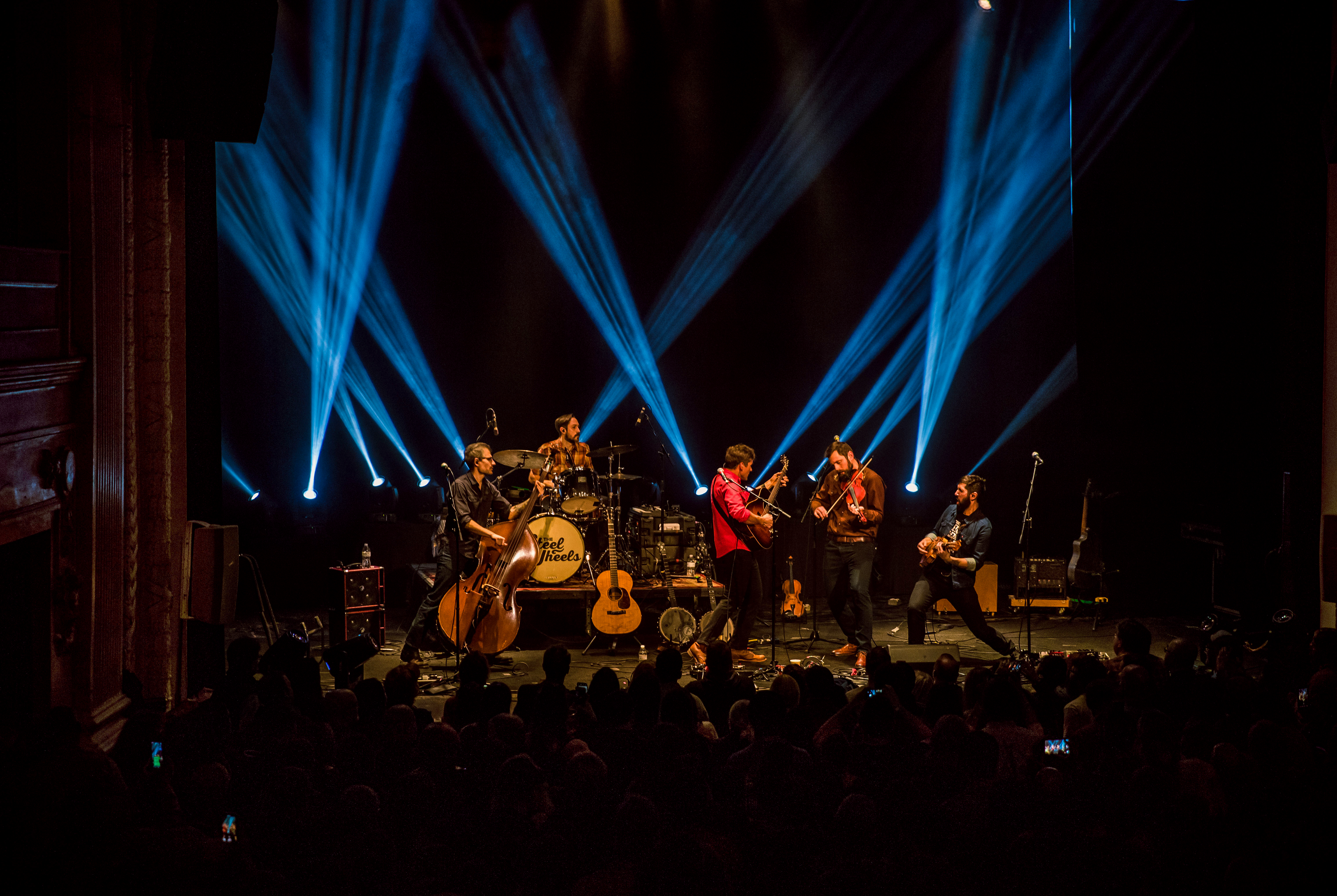
- The Jefferson Theater on February 16, 2019; Charlottesville, Virginia

Background information
- Origin: Harrisonburg, Virginia
- Genres: Americana, Folk, Bluegrass, Rock
- Occupations: Studio and Touring Band
- Years active: 2005 to present
- Label: Big Ring Records
- Members: Trent Wagler; Jay Lapp; Eric Brubaker; Kevin Joaquin Garcia; Jeremy Darrow
- Past members: Brian Dickel
- Website: thesteelwheels.com

The Steel Wheels are an Americana roots and folk-rock band based in the Blue Ridge Mountains of Virginia. Their current lineup includes Trent Wagler, Eric Brubaker, Jay Lapp, Kevin Garcia, and Jeremy Darrow. Since 2012, they have hosted the Red Wing Roots Music Festival, held each summer at Natural Chimneys Park and Campground in Mt. Solon, Virginia. The band’s most recent full-length release is their 2025 eponymous album The Steel Wheels.

== Biography ==
The band’s origins date back to 2005, when former Eastern Mennonite University students Trent Wagler, Eric Brubaker, Jay Lapp, and Brian Dickel began performing together. Originally a traditional string band showcasing original folk material penned by Wagler, The Steel Wheels have since expanded their sonic palette to include elements of bluegrass, gospel, blues, pop, country, and rock. In 2017, Kevin Garcia joined the band on drums and percussion. Later, Jeremy Darrow replaced bassist Brian Dickel, who departed to become a co-owner of Huss & Dalton Guitars in Staunton, VA.

== Red Wing Roots Music Festival ==
Since 2013, The Steel Wheels have hosted the Red Wing Roots Music Festival at Natural Chimneys Park in Mt. Solon, Virginia. The festival is well-regarded for its diverse lineup of Americana artists and its family-friendly atmosphere. Notable acts that have performed at Red Wing Roots include Old Crow Medicine Show, Robert Randolph, The Mavericks, Sarah Jarosz, Lucinda Williams, Steve Earle & the Dukes, The Del McCoury Band, Preservation Hall Jazz Band, The Punch Brothers, Lake Street Dive, and Dawes.

== Current Line-up ==
- Trent Wagler – Lead vocalist, mountain banjo player, guitarist, songwriter
- Jay Lapp – Mandolin, guitar, electric guitar, vocals
- Eric Brubaker – Fiddle, vocals
- Kevin Joaquin Garcia – Drums, hand percussion, keyboards, vocals
- Jeremy Darrow – Bass, vocals

== Discography ==
=== Studio albums ===
- Journal of a Barefoot Soldier (2005)
- Blue Heaven (2006)
- Adrienna Valentine (2008)
- Red Wing (2010)
- Uncloudy Day (2010)
- Lay Down, Lay Low (2012)
- No More Rain (2013)
- Leave Some Things Behind (2015)
- Wild as We Came Here (2017)
- Over the Trees (2019)
- Everyone a Song Volume One (2020)
- Everyone a Song Volume Two (2021)
- Sideways (2024)
- The Steel Wheels (2025)

=== Live albums ===
- The Steel Wheels, Live at Goose Creek (2011)
- The Steel Wheels, Live at The Station Inn Volume I (2018)
- The Steel Wheels, Live at The Jefferson Theater Volume II (2018)
