= Plague of Dreams =

Studio album by The Everybodyfields
- Released: September 15, 2005
- Label: Captain Mexico

The Everybodyfields chronology
Halfway There: Electricity and the South (2004)	Plague of Dreams (2005)	Nothing Is Okay (2007)

Professional ratings
Review scores
Source	Rating
PopMatters	8/10 link

Plague of Dreams is a 2005 album by The Everybodyfields.

== Track listing ==
1. Magazines
2. The Only King
3. Leaving
4. By Your Side
5. Arletta
6. Baby Please
7. Out of Town
8. Can't Have It
9. Fade Jeans Blue
10. In Your Boots
11. Good to Be Home
12. Angels
