= Huss & Dalton =

Acoustic guitar and banjo manufacturer

Huss & Dalton Guitar Co.
- Industry: Guitar manufacturing
- Founded: 1995, Staunton, Virginia
- Founder: Jeff Huss and Mark Dalton
- Headquarters: Staunton, Virginia
- Products: Guitars, banjos
- Website: hussanddalton.com

Huss & Dalton Guitar Company is an acoustic guitar and banjo manufacturer in Staunton, Virginia. The company was started on October 1, 1995, by luthiers Jeff Huss and Mark Dalton. Their first shop was located in the Mennonite community of Stuarts Draft, Virginia. They moved to their current location in Staunton in 1999. According to the company, the founders wanted to build an acoustic guitar that paid homage to guitar tradition while incorporating improvements in structural design and cosmetics. The company currently operates on a small scale, producing around 250 instruments per year in a two-story brick workshop.

== Construction ==
Huss and Dalton use two distinct construction styles in building their guitars. Standard Series models feature a 25' radius on the guitar top. They achieve this by building an arch into the braces, and preparing the sides in the same radius to accept the soundboard. Traditional Series guitars feature the same 25' radius in the braces, but the sides are flat, in a more traditional construction style.

== Construction details ==
Huss and Dalton base most guitars in their catalog on historical Martin Guitar designs and some vintage Gibson Guitar models, though they incorporate key design changes:

- Hand-split Appalachian red spruce braces, sourced from Mt. Rogers in Virginia
- Bridge plates made from Honduras rosewood
- AAA grade top woods
- Bone nuts, fully compensated
- Necks of quarter-sawn Honduras mahogany, maple, walnut, or Spanish cedar, with steel-reinforced truss rod
- Fingerboards of ebony
- Fingerboards bound by standard white binding or ebony to hide fret ends
- All guitars feature quarter sawn woods
- Larger sound hole than is common on Martin, Gibson, and others

== Models ==
In 2014 Huss & Dalton offered several guitar body styles:

- T Series
- C Series
- D Series
- F Series
- MJ Series
- OM Series
- O Series
- OO Series
- OOO Series
- Crossroads Series

=== Other instruments ===
Though primarily a guitar maker, Huss & Dalton also builds banjos. Jeff Huss began his career building banjos at Stelling Banjo Works.

=== The Jefferson Tulip Poplar Guitars ===
In the summer of 2008, the tree Liriodendron tulipifera (tulip poplar tree) on Thomas Jefferson's historic Monticello estate was felled due to old age and decay. Records indicate that Jefferson planted the tree outside his bedroom window, around 1807. The Thomas Jefferson Foundation contacted Huss & Dalton to determine if any remaining wood was suitable for one or more guitars. Although most of the tree was unusable, the pair found several boards of guitar-suitable wood. The company introduced a limited series of Monticello guitars whose proceeds they shared with the Thomas Jefferson Foundation.

== Musicians ==
Two musicians who played Huss & Dalton guitars or banjos include the late George Shuffler and the late James Alan Shelton. Over the years, Huss and Dalton built two signature-series guitars based on the preferred specs of both of these monumental bluegrass guitarists, the former of whom is well known for developing the cross-picking style of guitar, the latter for expanding and continuing the tradition, in limited runs of 25 pieces each. In October 2014, a 26th James Alan Shelton model was raffled off at IBMA, the proceeds of which went to assist Shelton's widow, Greta Shelton.

As of 2016, the company is building a series of guitars endorsed and designed by guitarist Albert Lee.

Other musicians who play Huss and Dalton guitars are:

Robin and Linda Williams, Albert Lee, Arlen Roth, Paul Simon, Edie Brickell, Bob Weir, Trent Wagler (The Steel Wheels), Toby Walker, Kagey Parrish and Laura Wortman (The Honey Dewdrops), The Stray Birds, John McCutcheon, Shane Adkins, Molly Tuttle, Mary Chapin Carpenter, Beth Nielsen Chapman, Dar Williams, Mary Ann Redmond, Jim Clare, Bill Baker and Derek Brock (The Bill Baker Band), Karyn Oliver, Matt Holsen, and Mary Gordon Hall.
