= Knight of the Carpet =

A so-called carpet knight was a person who had been awarded a title of knighthood by the king of England on a holiday occasion (or in time of peace), as opposed to knighthoods awarded for military service, or success in tournament games.

Notes and Queries explained in 1862:

The carpet knight is a term characteristically applied to those who obtained their honours "with unhacked rapier and on carpet consideration"... amidst the holiday gifts of their sovereign, rather than bravely acquired on the field of battle, or boasting a prescriptive claim by proving victorious at a tournament.

In William Shakespeare's comedic play Twelfth Night, Sir Toby Belch describes the cowardly Sir Andrew Aguecheek as a "knight dubbed with unhatched rapier and on carpet consideration."

Philip Massinger in his play The Maid of Honour, written in the 1620s, mentioned "loose Carpet-knights" who lived comfortably and "thought to charge, through dust and blood, an armed foe, Was but like graceful running at the ring, For a wanton mistress' glove".
