= The Everybodyfields =

American musical group

the everybodyfields
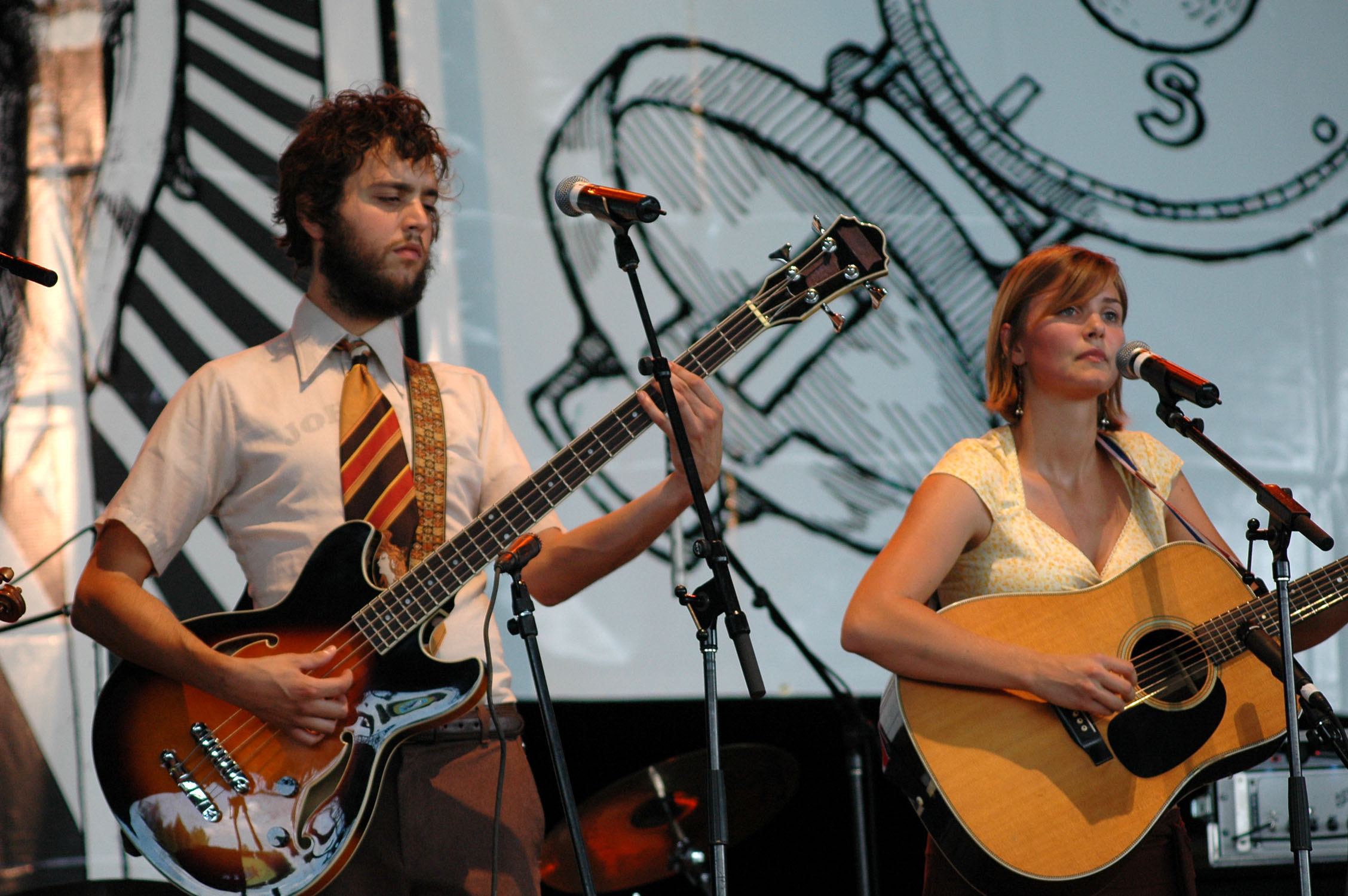
- Sam Quinn and Jill Andrews of the everybodyfields at The Festival Essex in Concord, NC

Background information
- Origin: Johnson City, Tennessee
- Genres: Alternative country; Indie folk; Roots rock
- Years active: 2004–2009, 2011
- Labels: Captain Mexico Records; Ramseur Records
- Past members: Jill Andrews, Sam Quinn, Tom Pryor, Josh Oliver, Jamie Cook, Megan McCormick, David Richey, Megan Gregory

the everybodyfields was an indie folk/alt-country band from Johnson City, Tennessee. The band was co-founded and fronted by Sam Quinn and Jill Andrews who met in 1999 while working at a summer camp. They were joined by dobroist David Richey. After Richey's departure, electric guitarist Megan McCormick joined the band; followed by fiddler Megan Gregory and drummer Travis Kammeyer. They were succeeded by keyboardist Josh Oliver, pedal steel player Tom Pryor, and drummer Jamie Cook.

the everybodyfields combined country, folk, bluegrass, rock and roll, and Americana to produce a unique sound that Harp Magazine called "stompin’ and twangin’ in world-class style." Sam Quinn's song "T.V.A." from Halfway There: Electricity and the South won 1st place in the Chris Austin Songwriting Contest 2005 at Merlefest. "Lonely Anywhere," from the album Nothing is Okay, was chosen by NPR as Song Of The Day for 29 February 2008. The band was the focus of increasing attention as a representative of the alternative country genre. They were chosen to play at Bonnaroo, Bristol Rhythm & Roots Reunion and Twangfest in 2008.

On June 5, 2009, the everybodyfields posted an announcement on their website that they were disbanding in order for Sam Quinn and Jill Andrews to pursue their respective solo careers.

In September 2011, reunion shows were held at the Bristol Rhythm & Roots festival and at Music City Roots.

== Members ==
- Jill Andrews (vocals, bass guitar, acoustic guitar)
- Sam Quinn (vocals, acoustic guitar, bass guitar)
- Josh Oliver (keyboard, guitar)
- Tom Pryor (pedal steel)
- Jamie Cook (drums)

=== Former ===
- David Richey (vocals, dobro)
- Megan McCormick (vocals, lap steel, electric guitar)
- Megan Gregory (vocals, fiddle)
- Andrew Kelly (vocals, electric guitar, mandolin)
- Travis Kammeyer (drums)
- Angela Oudean (vocals, fiddle)
- Emma O'Donnell (fiddle)

== Discography ==
- Halfway There: Electricity and the South (2004)
- Plague of Dreams (2005)
- Nothing is Okay (2007)
