= Natural Chimneys =

Rock structure in Virginia, United States

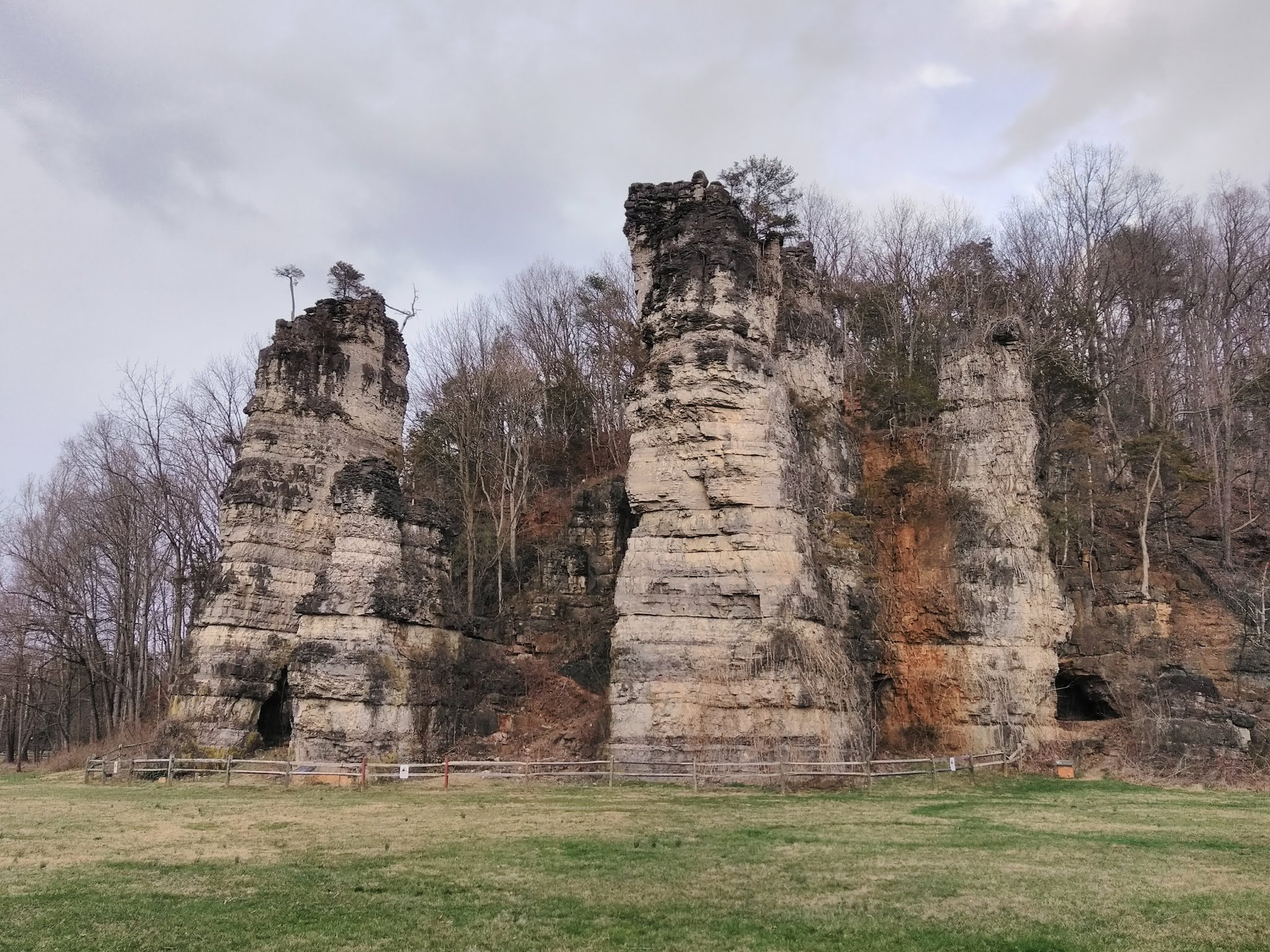

- Location within Virginia Location within the United States
- Type: Regional park
- Location: Mt. Solon; Augusta County, Virginia
- Coordinates: 38°21′28″N 79°04′34″W
- Operator: Augusta County Parks and Recreation
- Open: All year
- Camp sites: 145

Natural Chimneys, known as the Cyclopean Towers in the 19th century, is a natural rock structure located near Mt. Solon in Augusta County, Virginia in the United States, in the Shenandoah Valley. The formation is a central feature of a regional park owned and operated by Augusta County.

The formation includes seven rock "chimneys" that range in height from 65 to 120 feet (20 to 37 m) above ground level. The chimneys are formed from limestone that began to accumulate and harden into stone about 500 million years ago in the Cambrian Period of the Paleozoic Era, when the region was underwater. Over time, regional uplift accompanying the formation of the Appalachian Mountains, raised the layers of limestone closer to the surface. Later, during the Eocene epoch, at thin seam of mafic magma intruded between layers of the Conococheague Formation to form a sill. Most recently, dissolution of the limestone by groundwater exploited vertical networks of fractures, at first forming caves and eventually solution valleys that separated the solid block of limestone into separate fins and "towers." Dissolution continues today, diminishing the bulk of the towers infinitesimally during each rainstorm.

Multiple caves are found at Natural Chimneys, including Brown's Cave and the Cave of the Wooden Steps. During the Pleistocene era, snowshoe hares, Arctic shrews, taiga voles, spruce grouse, coachwhips, passenger pigeons, diamond-back rattlesnakes, and long-nosed peccaries roamed the Chimneys area.

The Natural Chimneys Park and Campground, located along the North River, has a 145-site campground with a pool, playground, and hiking trails. The UTMB Grindstone Festival, an endurance running event including a 100-mile race, takes place at the park each fall. The park also hosts one of the largest jousting tournaments in the eastern United States. The tournament is held on the third Saturday of August, and has taken place annually since 1821. The tournament includes the historical sport of "running at the ring". The Red Wing Roots music festival is held annually at Natural Chimneys. Augusta County owns the property and maintains the facility.

== Gallery ==
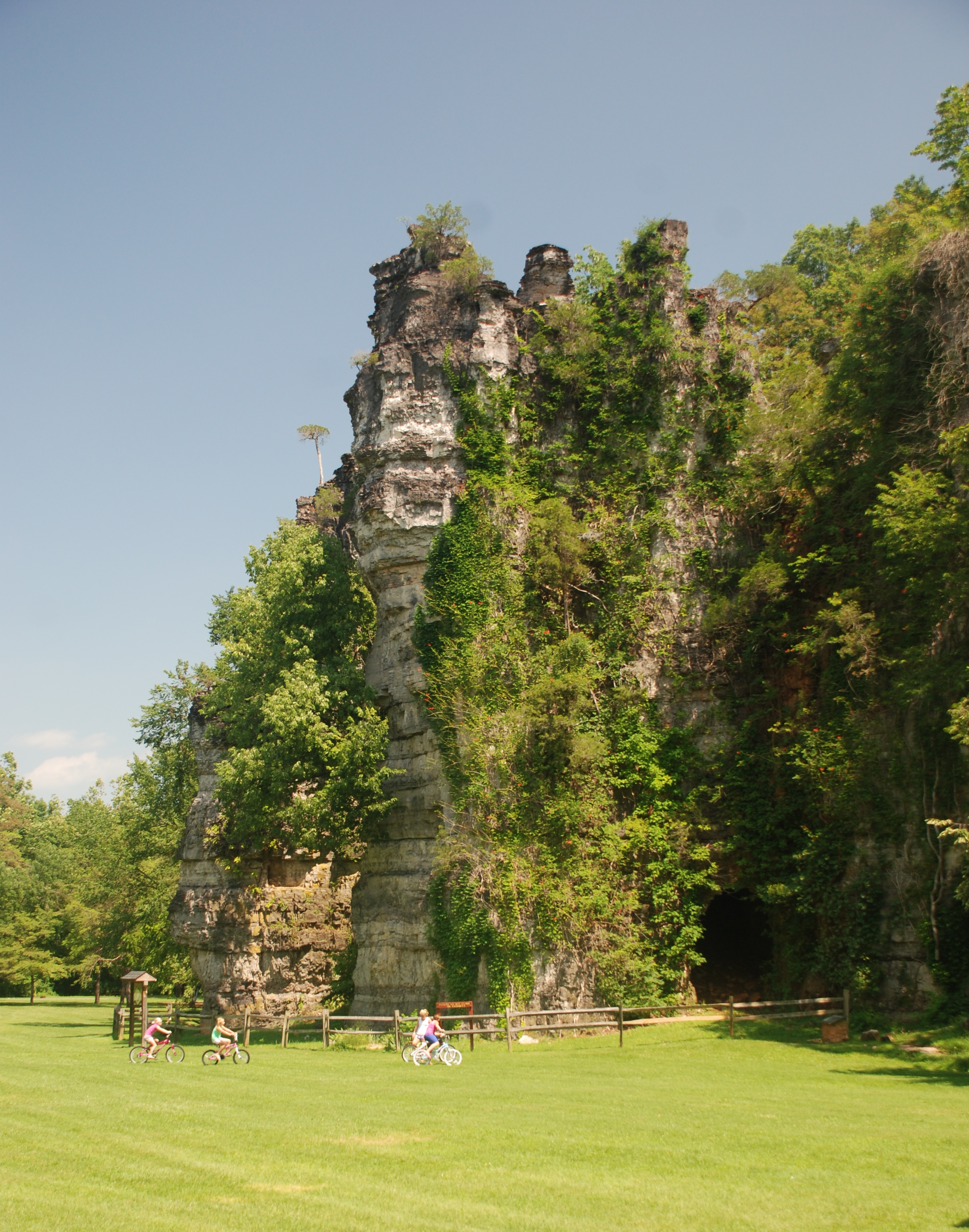
Natural Chimneys.

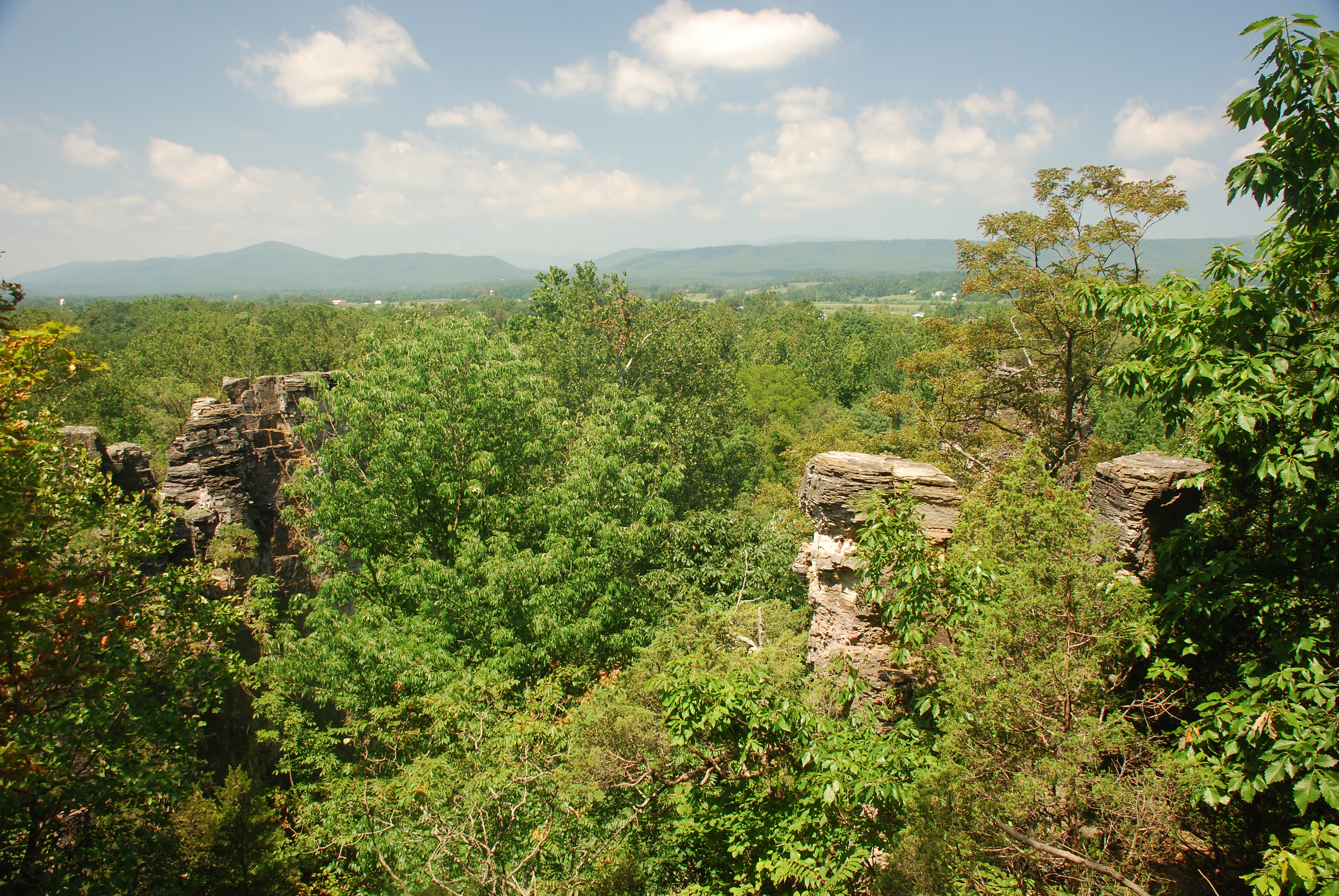
View from the top of Natural Chimneys.

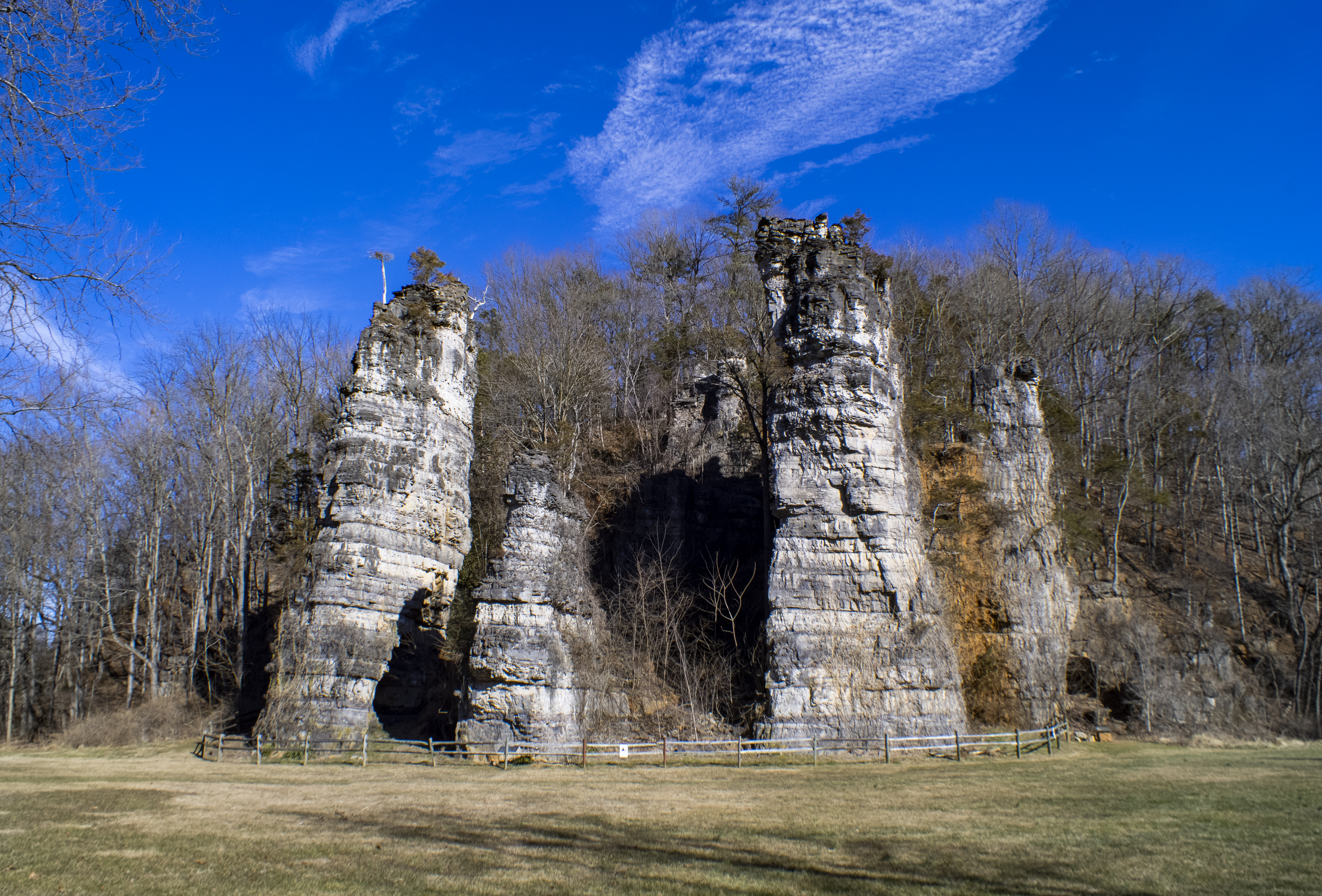
Natural Chimneys shot in January 2021
