= Mount Solon, Virginia =

Unincorporated community in Virginia, United States

- Unincorporated community
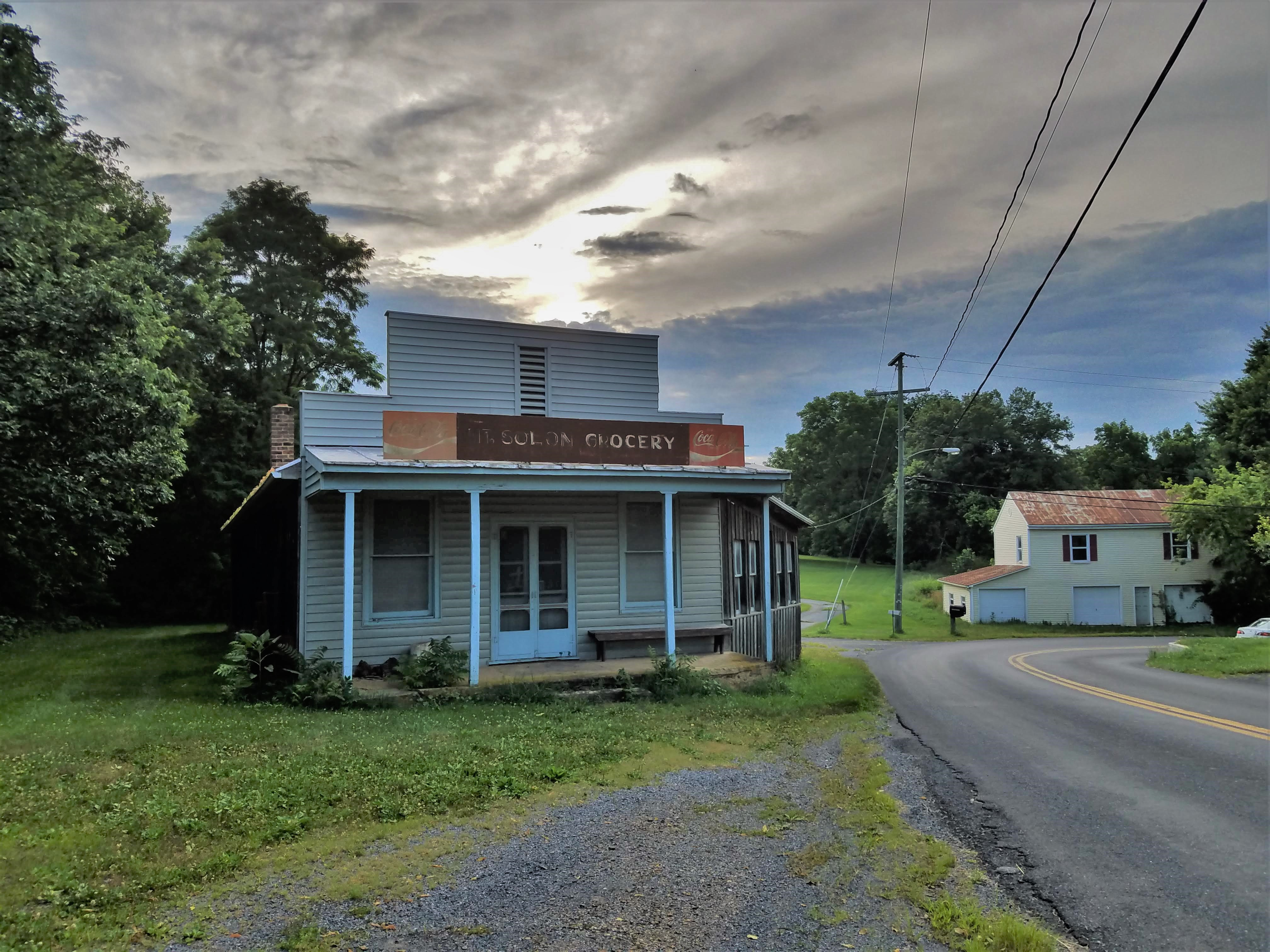
- Mt. Solon Grocery on Natural Chimneys Road

- Location within Virginia Location within the United States
- Coordinates: 38°20′41″N 79°05′06″W
- Country: United States
- State: Virginia
- County: Augusta
- Elevation: 1,325 ft (404 m)
- Time zone: UTC-5 (Eastern (EST))
  - Summer (DST): UTC-4 (EDT)
- ZIP code: 22843
- Area code: 540
- GNIS feature ID: 1497028

Mount Solon is an unincorporated community in Augusta County, Virginia, United States, 22 miles (35 km) southwest of Harrisonburg and 20 miles (32 km) north of Staunton. It is part of the Staunton–Waynesboro Micropolitan Statistical Area.

== History ==
The earliest settlers of Mount Solon were the Scots-Irish and the Germans. In 1799, James Cochran, of minor notable political fame further south in North Carolina, established a small mill and residence on the small creek, which would eventually run through the center of town. Owing to the mill's and the town's centrality between the two growing markets of Harrisonburg and Staunton, several businesses sprang up, and the once-isolated town began to prosper. In the early 1900s, there existed a Ford dealership, a gas station, the Mount Solon Bank, Cochran's mill, and a few other shops gathered around an expanding downtown. Moreover, the ill-fated Chesapeake and Western Railroad (C&W) ran an important rail line through Mount Solon, thus ensuring secure connections to a variety of external agricultural markets throughout the region. The Great Depression, however, severely impacted both the Shenandoah Valley and the town of Mount Solon. Following the closure of the old mill in the late 1930s, many townspeople left Mount Solon in search of better jobs. When the C&W withdrew its support, and was later consolidated with Norfolk Southern, the once-thriving little town became a ghost town virtually overnight. Today, only a few dilapidated local shops remain in town and few indicators of Mount Solon's former glory days remain intact. The Old Mount Solon Bank presents a fine example of postbellum architecture and the recently restored Lincoln Manor House at Spring Meadows Farm provides an excellent illustration of a Shenandoah Valley plantation house.

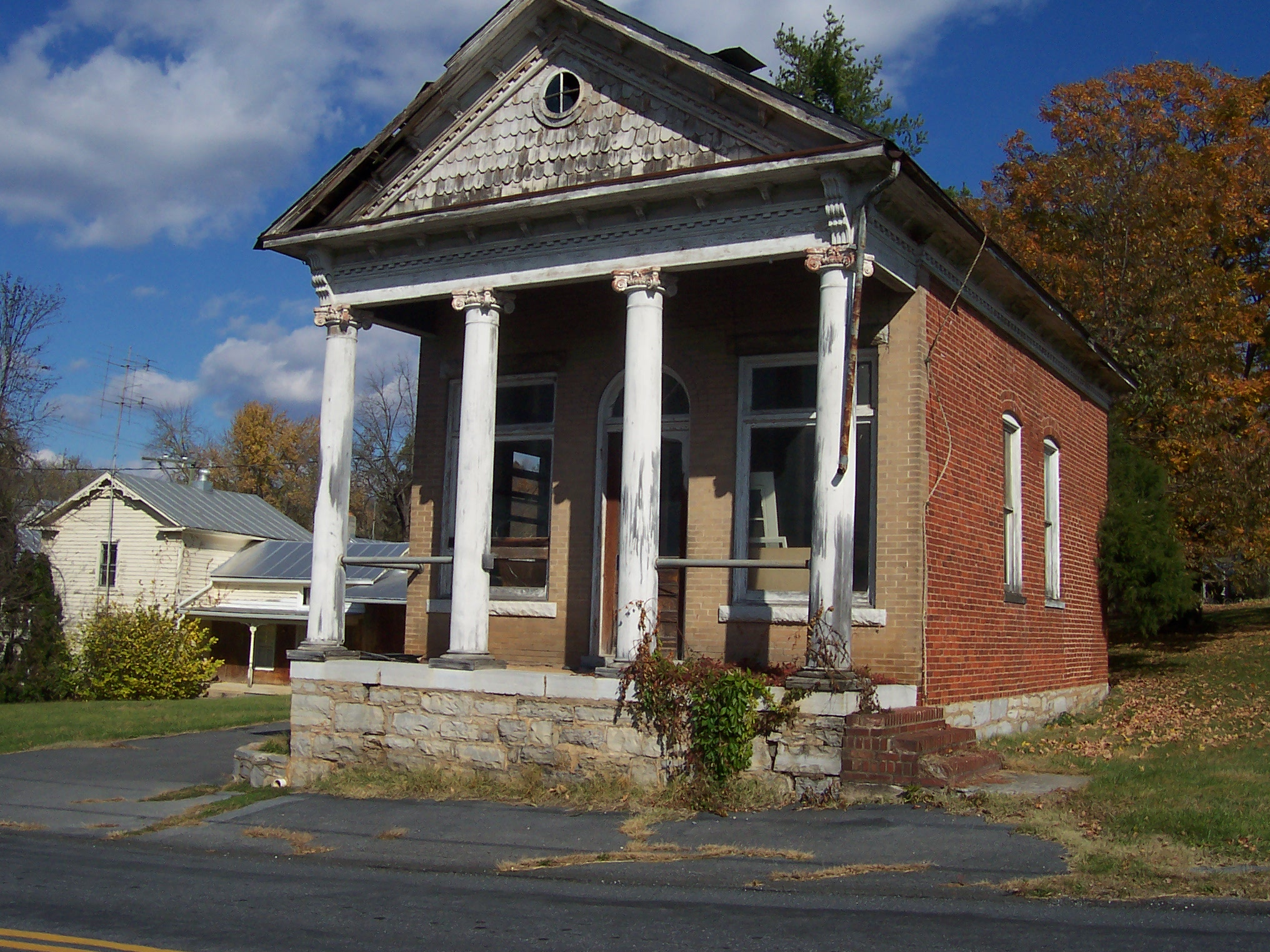
The old Mount Solon bank.

Local lore says that around the first quarter of the 20th century, explosives were used to blow a hole in the northwest corner (newer brickwork repair visible in photo) during a robbery.

Long Glade Farm and the Mt. Zion Schoolhouse are listed on the National Register of Historic Places.

== Mount Solon in the Civil War ==
During the Valley Campaign of the American Civil War, General Thomas J. "Stonewall" Jackson held a meeting with General Richard Ewell in Mount Solon on May 17, 1862. Gen. Jackson left the Battle of McDowell for Mount Solon where he met up with Gen. Ewell.

== Attractions ==
Mount Solon is known most for Natural Chimneys Regional Park, which is owned by Augusta County and represents a favorite regional recreation space. The name originates from the seven towering rock formations located inside of the park, the tallest of which is 120 feet. These limestone formations seem like chimneys from a certain viewpoint. Besides the Olympic-sized swimming pool at Natural Chimneys, there are also numerous campground sites throughout the park. On the third Saturday in August every year, a jousting tournament is held at Natural Chimneys. This is the oldest continually held sporting event in the United States. Due to the importance of this equestrian tournament, the National Jousting Hall of Fame is located at Natural Chimneys. Currently, Mount Solon plays host to the Red Wing Roots Music Festival, which emphasizes bluegrass and Americana musical acts.

== Stokesville Observatory ==
Close by Mount Solon is the Stokesville Observatory, with the telescope owned and operated by the James Madison University Physics Department. The observatory is not open to the general public, although it is open to reservations for special tours.
