= Stuarts Draft, Virginia =

CDP in Augusta County, Virginia, US

Stuarts Draft
- CDP
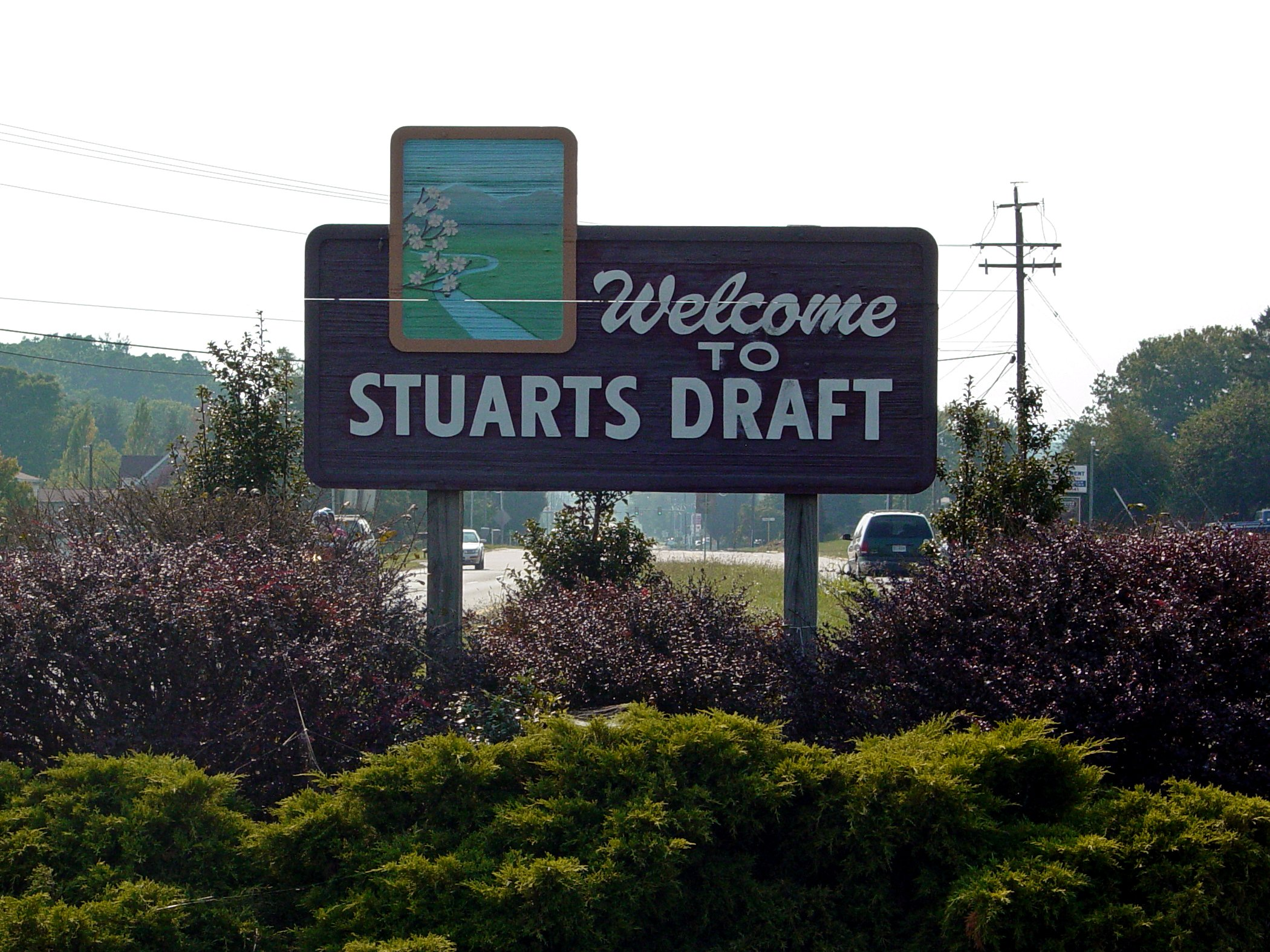

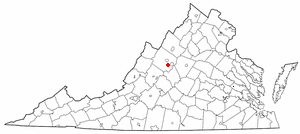
- Location in Virginia

- Location within Virginia Location within the United States
- Coordinates: 38°1′39″N 79°1′44″W
- Country: United States
- State: Virginia
- County: Augusta
- Founded: 1837

Area
  - Total: 29.31 sq mi (75.9 km^{2})
- Elevation: 1,421 ft (433 m)

Population (2020)
  - Total: 12,142
  - Density: 165/sq mi (63.8/km^{2})
- Time zone: UTC-5 (EST)
  - Summer (DST): UTC-4 (EDT)
- ZIP code: 24477
- Area code: 540
- FIPS code: 51-76272
- GNIS feature ID: 1500184

Stuarts Draft is a census-designated place (CDP) in Augusta County, Virginia, United States. It is part of the Staunton–Waynesboro Micropolitan Statistical Area and adjacent to the South River. Its population was 12,142 as of the 2020 census.

Stuarts Draft has a history as an agricultural community, dating back to the 1730s. The modern community also has a processing and manufacturing cluster that includes Hershey, Hollister Incorporated, McKee Foods, NIBCO, Regal Rexnord, Ply Gem - Cornerstone, and a Target Corporation Distribution Center. As one writer notes, "A visitor to Stuarts Draft can see these imposing plants with cattle grazing in a nearby field..."

== History ==
Before the arrival of European settlers, the area was the territory of the Shawnee; none of their settlements are known to have existed in Stuarts Draft. Two non-resident tribes were frequent visitors to the area: the Delaware from the north and the Catawba from the south. When European settlers first moved into Augusta County in 1732, these three tribes were in the midst of a war. As a result, armed war parties were a common sight in the white settlements.

In 1736, William Beverly received a patent from Virginia's Governor William Gooch for 118,491 acres (479.52 km^{2}; 47,952 ha) in what became Augusta County. At the time, this was the "outermost limits of Virginia". Beverly sold parcels of land to settlers, including property that is now in Stuarts Draft. One settler was Archibald Stuart, a Scotch Presbyterian, who arrived in the area in 1738. Stuart settled about three miles east of Tinkling Spring Presbyterian Church which he helped found in 1744. This property became known as the Pratt Farm and is located on what is now U.S. 340 near Northgate Avenue. Other early settlers who purchased land from Beverly in what is now Stuarts Draft include Robert Alexander, James Bell, John Black, John Christian, John Colter, Samuel Davidson, William Long, Finley McClure, Joseph Mills, Robert Moffet, and James Patton.

These early settlers built houses and cleared the land for farming. The most successful crops were hemp, corn, wheat, and flax which was mixed with wool to make linsey-woolsey clothes. Farmers experimented with tobacco and cotton but found hemp the most successful cash crop, supplying raw material for naval rope. Robert Stuart operated a chopping mill in Stuarts Draft.

In 1749, Archibald Stuart's son Thomas purchased a patent 353 acres (1.43 km^{2}; 143 ha) near the South River. The tract was bound by Robert Stuart's patent to the north, Samuel Davidson's patent to the south, John Black's patent to the west, and James Patton's patent to the east. There, Thomas lived with his wife Elizabeth (née Moore) and their nine children. The property had a small valley or cove, regionally called a draft. (Note: Other theories abound as urban legend. One says that draft refers to the document drafting the land sale. However, this document was called a patent by Virginia at the time. Another theory says that draft is an old term for river or creek. A third theory says draft refers to a river crossing on Stuart’s land or the South River itself. However, according to the Beverly Patent map, Stuart's land did not extend to or cross the river. Another theory is that the plain on the south side of the river tends to channel the wind, thus forming a constant breeze or draft.)

There was fighting in Augusta County during the French and Indian War (1754–1763), smaller conflicts with Native Americans in 1764 and 1774, and minor skirmishes through 1794. When Thomas Stuart died, his sons were not living nearby, and his widow left the patent or land grant, making it available for resale. The Stuart property was purchased by John Harper in 1800, with some parts being owned by Joseph McComb and Jacob Farror at a later date. (Note: According to Catlett and Fishburne, the draft was located in the Harper and Farror properties in 1928.)

Before 1800, the roads to Stuarts Draft were poor, limiting travel to horseback or sleds rather than wheeled wagons. The settlement did not have a post office until 1837. The first post office was in the former Thomas Stuart cabin, a hewed-pine log structure then on the Harper property. (Note: According to Catlett and Fishburne, the Thomas Stuart cabin survived on the Harper farm as later as 1881. The Harper family used it for storage.) As a result, the name Stuarts Draft was chosen for the post office and the community. Later, the post office moved three miles west of town and was operated by postmaster James M. Hall.

In the 1850s, the Howardsville Turnpike was built through Stuarts Draft. Funded by stock as a commercial venture, the turnpike allowed Stuarts Drafts' farmers to take their wheat and other goods by horse-drawn wagons to the trading post in Howardsville, Virginia. The trip took a week but yielded trade goods such as flour, sugar, and other staples. Howardsville was located in Albemarle County on the James River; from there, trade goods went to Richmond by barge.

In 1856, Stuarts Draft's first doctor arrived; James M. Watson was a graduate of the University of Virginia's medical school in nearby Charlottesville. Watson traveled on horseback to visit patients. Other families moving to Stuarts Draft include Caldwell, Churchman, Forrer, Grass, Harnsberger, Hicks, Johnson, Kindig, Patterson, Prior, Van Lear, and Wilson.

During the Civil War, Stuarts Draft's residents provided supplies and men to the Confederate Army. The community's first school was established before the Civil War in Barterbrook, four miles from Stuarts Draft. This one-room schoolhouse was replaced by another schoolhouse behind today's Finley Memorial Presbyterian Church in Stuarts Draft. The new school started with one room but later was expanded to five rooms as the number of students grew.

The post office moved back to town in 1881 when the Shenandoah Valley Railroad was under construction. The railroad began stopping in Stuarts Draft in 1882 and connected the town with Roanoke and Hagerstown. The railroad brought growth and prosperity to the farming community, making it one of the wealthiest sections of August County. A village or commercial area formed along the railroad track, expanding to about a mile south of the tracks. A train depot was constructed in 1891 (and demolished in 1975). By 1885, Charles H. Cohron opened C. H. Cohron's Store alongside the tracks, while Fox's Store was located on Howardsville Turnpike. In 1886, the J. B. McChesney Store opened beside the railroad. Cohron built the Stuarts Draft Mill along the railroad tracks in 1893, followed by a warehouse. In 1891, the Shenandoah Valley Railroad was purchased by the Norfolk and Western Railway, further expanding Stuart Draft's reach.

George Samuel Etter opened his Etter Funeral Home in Stuarts Draft in 1895. (Note: Etter moved his funeral home to Waynesboro in 1918. However, the former funeral home survives the oldest commercial building in Stuarts Draft.) Other businesses that opened in Stuarts Draft in 1895 include a barrel factory and a chair factory. Also in 1895, the Fishersville, Barterbrook, and Stuarts Draft Telephone Company was established. Its first telephones were operational in May 1897. In 1904, the Stuarts Draft post office included two delivery routes, serving 1,200 people. Stuarts Draft School was the first school in Augusta County to operate for a nine-month term in 1906. The Citizens Educational League raised funds to expand the school building and add a playground, library, and organ.

In 1907, the People's Bank opened in Stuarts Draft and was operated by cashier S. H. Moore. In 1913, B. B. Kube opened a blacksmith shop in the Stuart Draft village area; he rebuilt his shop after the original structure burned in 1928. Dr. William Baldwin Dodge, a physician for railroad employees, became Stuart Draft's doctor and a businessman. He opened the Dodge Inn on Main Street (now Draft Avenue), providing accommodations and packed lunches for travelers. (Note: The Dodge Hotel was demolished in 1987.) Dodge also developed Mountain Lake, now called Shenandoah Acres, in the 1939s.

In the early 20th century, Stuarts Draft was a farming community specialized in livestock and fruit. In the 1920s, fruit production included apples, peaches, and pears. At that time, the average apple production from Stuarts Draft was 200 to 400 railroad car loads. Stuart Drafts' main apple producers were Alta Vista, Robert Black, Cisco Orchards, William Baldwin Dodge, George Harper, Samuel B. Harper, Charles I. Keyt, Linda Vista, and Virginia Valley—with each growing 1,000 to 6,000 barrels each annually. Dodge was the only large-scale grower of cranberries south of New Jersey, yielding 500 to 1,000 bushels a year. Cattle was the most common commercial livestock, although farmers in Stuarts Draft also raised hogs, sheep, and poultry. Most of the community's households produced eggs. There was also a large incubator in Stuarts Draft that produced 50,000 to 75,000 eggs annually.

In the 1940s, a number of German–speaking members of Old Order Amish moved to Stuart's Draft from Pennsylvania. In the 1960s, Stuarts Draft entered the modern industrial era with the opening of Draftco and the J. K. Porter plant (now NIBCO). In the 1970s, other manufacturers moved to Stuarts Draft, including Hollister, Mastic Corporation/Alcoa (now PlyGem Industries), and P. T. Components (now Rexnord). This was followed by a Hershey Company plant and McKee Foods in the 1980s and 1990s, respectively.

Manufacturing significantly increased the population and development of Stuarts Draft. In 2017 and 2018, the community held a series of public meetings to create a Stuart Draft Small Area Plan. The process included elected officials and consultants. Spanning 2019 through 2039, the resulting plan addresses land use, development, and transportation needs. It also defines areas for urban development (business, industrial, public use, and residential) and agricultural and rural conservation.

== Geography ==
The Stuarts Draft CDP is located in southeast Augusta County on the northwestern side of the Blue Ridge Mountains. It is located in the Shenandoah Valley, part of the valley belt of Silurian limestone. The area features a flat valley or cove, regionally called a draft. The soil is rich and fertile, well suited for agricultural purposes.

Stuarts Draft is eight miles south of Staunton and seven miles southwest of Waynesboro. According to the 2020 United States Census Bureau, the CDP has a total area of 29.31 square miles (75.9 km^{2}). This is an increase from 2010 when the area was listed as being 19.82 acres. The CDP includes the Christians Creek and the South River watersheds and parts of the Beverley Manor, Riverheads, and the South River magisterial districts. The South River is a tributary of the South Fork of the Shenandoah River. Major streams in Stuarts Draft include Barterbrook Branch, Cole's Run, Deep Pond Run, Falling Rock Creek, Folly Mills Creek, Goose Creek, Johns Runs, Loves Run, Pine Run, and Stony Run.

The George Washington National Forest is at the southern border of Stuarts Draft. The forests consist primarily of oaks, including white, black, red, post, and chestnut oaks. Other trees include ash, balsam fir, beech, birch, black maple, black spruce, black walnut, cucumber tree, dogwood, elm, fir, gum, hemlock, hickory, hornbeam, locust, mulberry, persimmon, red cedar, red maple, sugar maple, sumac, sycamore, tulip poplar, umbrella tree (magnolia tripetala), white cherry, while maple, white pine, and yellow pine. Some areas include rhododendron and laurel. Wildlife native to the area include black bear, deer, red fox, porcupine, beaver, hare, rabbit, and weasel. Perennial streams in the area include native brook trout. Mineral deposits in the national forest include clay, gravel, iron, manganese, and sand.

Stuarts Draft includes several natural and man-made ponds. Lake Wilda is Green Pond is a naturally occurring high-elevation pond on the Big Levels Ridge. It is five acres in size during the wet season. The Virginia Commission of Game and Inland Fisheries constructed the Maple Flats Ponds in the late 1950s to serve migrating waterfowl. However, this project failed because water levels were too low seasonally. These ponds are now stocked with bass, bluegill, and catfish for recreational use, There are naturally occurring sinkhole ponds near the Maple Flats Ponds, including Spring Pond and Twin Ponds that are home to a botanically significant range of plants.

Adjacent to the national forest, Shenandoah Acres includes a small spring-fed lake. Historically, the property included a cranberry bog, one of the sinkhole ponds in the Maple Flats area. The cranberry bog was well known by botanists as a site for several rare plants and orchids, including the rose pogonia and grass pink orchids. In the journal Claytonia, the botanist Lloyd Carr described the pond as a sea of pink when the orchids were in bloom. However, the bog was destroyed to create Shenandoah Acres, and many of the rare species became locally extinct.

The Stuarts Draft CDP includes agricultural conservation areas and rural conservation areas. The Cowbane Natural Area Preserve includes 147 acres (0.59 km^{2}; 59 ha)1 with calcareous spring marshes, mesic prairies, and wet prairies. These three landscapes were historically common in the area but were reduced over time by agriculture and development.

=== Climate ===
The summers in Stuarts Draft are warm and humid. Winters in Stuarts Draft are cold and snowy. The temperature ranges are from 26 °F to 86 °F; it is rarely below 11 °F or above 93 °F.

Climate data for Stuarts Draft, Virginia
Month	Jan	Feb	Mar	Apr	May	Jun	Jul	Aug	Sep	Oct	Nov	Dec	Year
Average high	44 °F (7 °C)	47 °F (8 °C)	56 °F (13 °C)	66 °F (19 °C)	74 °F (23 °C)	82 °F (28 °C)	85 °F (29 °C)	83 °F (28 °C)	77 °F (25 °C)	67 °F (19 °C)	56 °F (13 °C)	47 °F (8 °C)	
Daily mean	34 °F (1 °C)	37 °F (3 °C)	45 °F (7 °C)	55 °F (13 °C)	63 °F (17 °C)	72 °F (22 °C)	75 °F (24 °C)	73 °F (23 °C)	67 °F (19 °C)	56 °F (13 °C)	46 °F (8 °C)	37 °F (3 °C)	
Average low	27 °F (−3 °C)	28 °F (−2 °C)	35 °F (2 °C)	44 °F (7 °C)	53 °F (12 °C)	62 °F (17 °C)	65 °F (18 °C)	64 °F (18 °C)	57 °F (14 °C)	46 °F (8 °C)	36 °F (2 °C)	30 °F (−1 °C)	
Average precipitation	2.3 in (58 mm)	2.4 in (61 mm)	2.8 in (71 mm)	2.8 in (71 mm)	3.5 in (89 mm)	3.5 in (89 mm)	3.2 in (81 mm)	3.6 in (91 mm)	3.2 in (81 mm)	3.6 in (91 mm)	2.8 in (71 mm)	2.9 in (74 mm)	36.7 in (930 mm)
Average snowfall	5.9 in (150 mm)	6.8 in (170 mm)	2.8 in (71 mm)	0.1 in (2.5 mm)	0.0 in (0 mm)	0.0 in (0 mm)	0.0 in (0 mm)	0.0 in (0 mm)	0.0 in (0 mm)	0.0 in (0 mm)	1.0 in (25 mm)	4.6 in (120 mm)	21.2 in (540 mm)

== Demographics ==
Historical population
Census	Pop.	Note	%±
1920	448		—
1980	1,776		—
1990	5,067		185.3%
2000	8,367		65.1%
2010	9,235		10.4%
2020	12,142		31.5%
U.S. Decennial Census

=== 2020 census ===
As of the 2020 census, Stuarts Draft had a population of 12,142. The median age was 43.1 years. 21.7% of residents were under the age of 18 and 20.5% of residents were 65 years of age or older. For every 100 females there were 92.9 males, and for every 100 females age 18 and over there were 90.4 males age 18 and over.

0.0% of residents lived in urban areas, while 100.0% lived in rural areas.

There were 4,924 households in Stuarts Draft, of which 28.4% had children under the age of 18 living in them. Of all households, 53.1% were married-couple households, 14.4% were households with a male householder and no spouse or partner present, and 25.4% were households with a female householder and no spouse or partner present. About 24.8% of all households were made up of individuals and 12.6% had someone living alone who was 65 years of age or older.

There were 5,161 housing units, of which 4.6% were vacant. The homeowner vacancy rate was 0.8% and the rental vacancy rate was 5.8%.

Racial composition as of the 2020 census
Race	Number	Percent
White	10,796	88.9%
Black or African American	456	3.8%
American Indian and Alaska Native	22	0.2%
Asian	84	0.7%
Native Hawaiian and Other Pacific Islander	9	0.1%
Some other race	142	1.2%
Two or more races	633	5.2%
Hispanic or Latino (of any race)	406	3.3%

=== Demographic estimates ===
A demographic profile source reports that 1.6% of the White population is Hispanic or Latino, 1.3% of the total population is foreign-born, and 9.4% of residents under age 65 have a disability. The same source reports that 94% of residents age 25 and older are high school graduates or higher, and 20.5% have a bachelor's degree or higher.

A separate estimate reported an average household size of 2.47.

== Economy ==
According to the 2020 U.S. census, the median household income in the Stuarts Draft CDP is $63,679, the average household income is $$75,788, and the per capita income is $27,975. Of those over sixteen years of age, 63.6% are employed in the civilian workforce.

As of July 2022, there are 5,260 housing units in Stuarts Draft, with an average value of $251,669 and a median value of $251,669. 57% of the residents are owner-occupied. In Stuarts Draft, 10.8% of the residents live in poverty, while 5.9% of the people under 65 years do not have health insurance.

=== Employers ===
Agriculture continues to play a role in the economy of the area. However, Stuarts Draft's largest employers are its manufacturing and distribution facilities. These industries were attracted to Stuarts Draft by its proximity to major interstates and metropolitan areas, a relatively flat landscape, and a "high-quality workforce with a strong work ethic."

Draftco Inc. is a machine and fabrication shop founded in Stuarts Draft in 1965. In 1969, NIBCO (formerly J. K. Porter), a manufacturer of wrought copper fittings for the flow control industry, opened its manufacturing plant in Stuarts Draft. Hollister Incorporated, which develops and manufactures medical devices and products, opened its facility in Stuarts Draft in 1979. Other manufacturers moving to Stuarts Draft in the 1970s include Ply-Gem Siding Group (formerly Alcoa) and Rexnord (formerly P. T. Components).

The Hershey Company opened its second-largest United States manufacturing plant in Stuarts Draft in 1980. It employees more than 1,300 people. In February 2022, some Hershey employees started a campaign to join the Bakery, Confectionery, Tobacco Workers and Grain Millers’ union (BCTGM) to gain better working conditions. Hershey was against unionization and responded by hiring union-busting consultants, Labor Relations Institute. In March 2022, Hershey's workers voted against unionization at the Stuarts Draft plant.

McKee Foods moved to the area in 1990 and has around 1,000 employees. It manufactures Little Debbie snack cakes. The Target Mid-Atlantic Distribution Center in Stuarts Draft has a footprint of 1,650,000 square feet (38 acres; 153,000 m^{2}). It was listed as the eighth largest tilt-up building in the world by the American Tilt-Up Association. The Plant Company opened in Stuarts Draft in 2019 with a 5 acres (0.020 km^{2}; 2.0 ha) commercial greenhouse. It grows houseplants exclusively for the consumer brand Proven Winners.

Top Employers in Stuarts Draft, Virginia
Rank	Business	Number of employees	Reference
1	Hershey Chocolate of Virginia	1,300 and over	
2	Target Distribution Center	1,000 and over	
3	McKee Foods Corporation	500 to 999	
4	Hollister	500 to 999	
5	NIBCO of Virginia	250 to 499	
6	McKee Foods Transportation	100 to 249	
7	Rexford Industries	50 to 99	

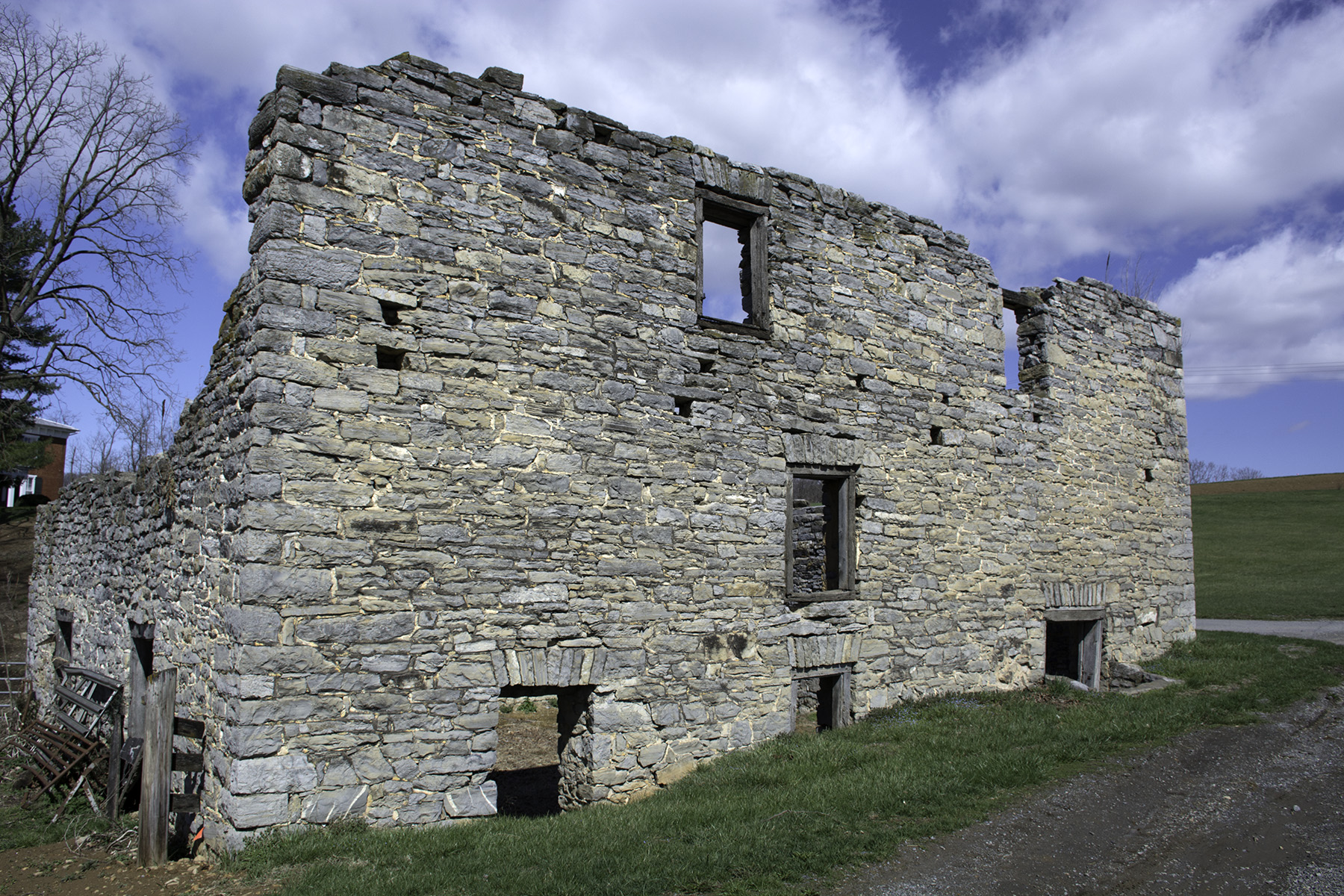
Ruins of Bare's Mill

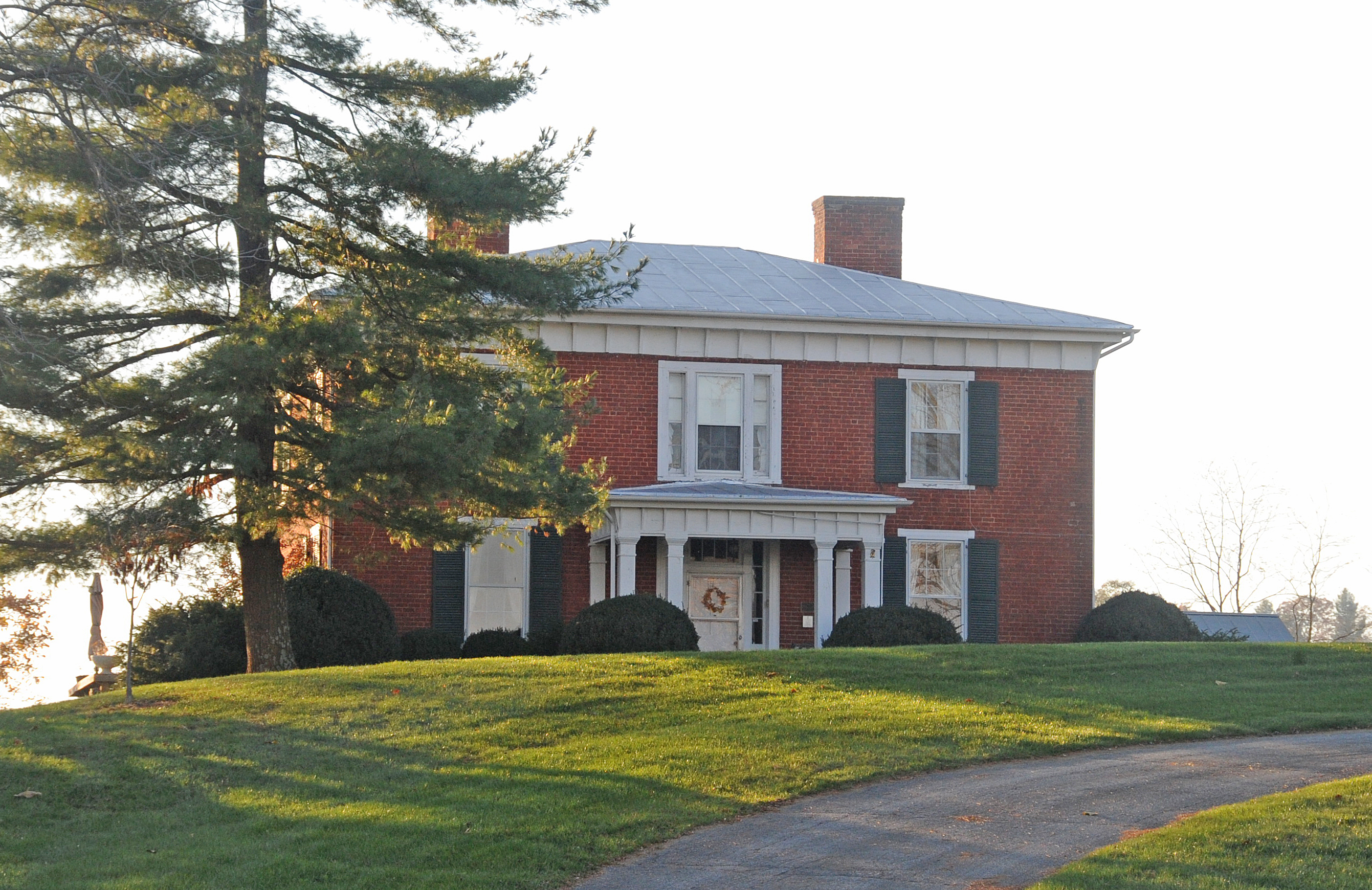
Bare House

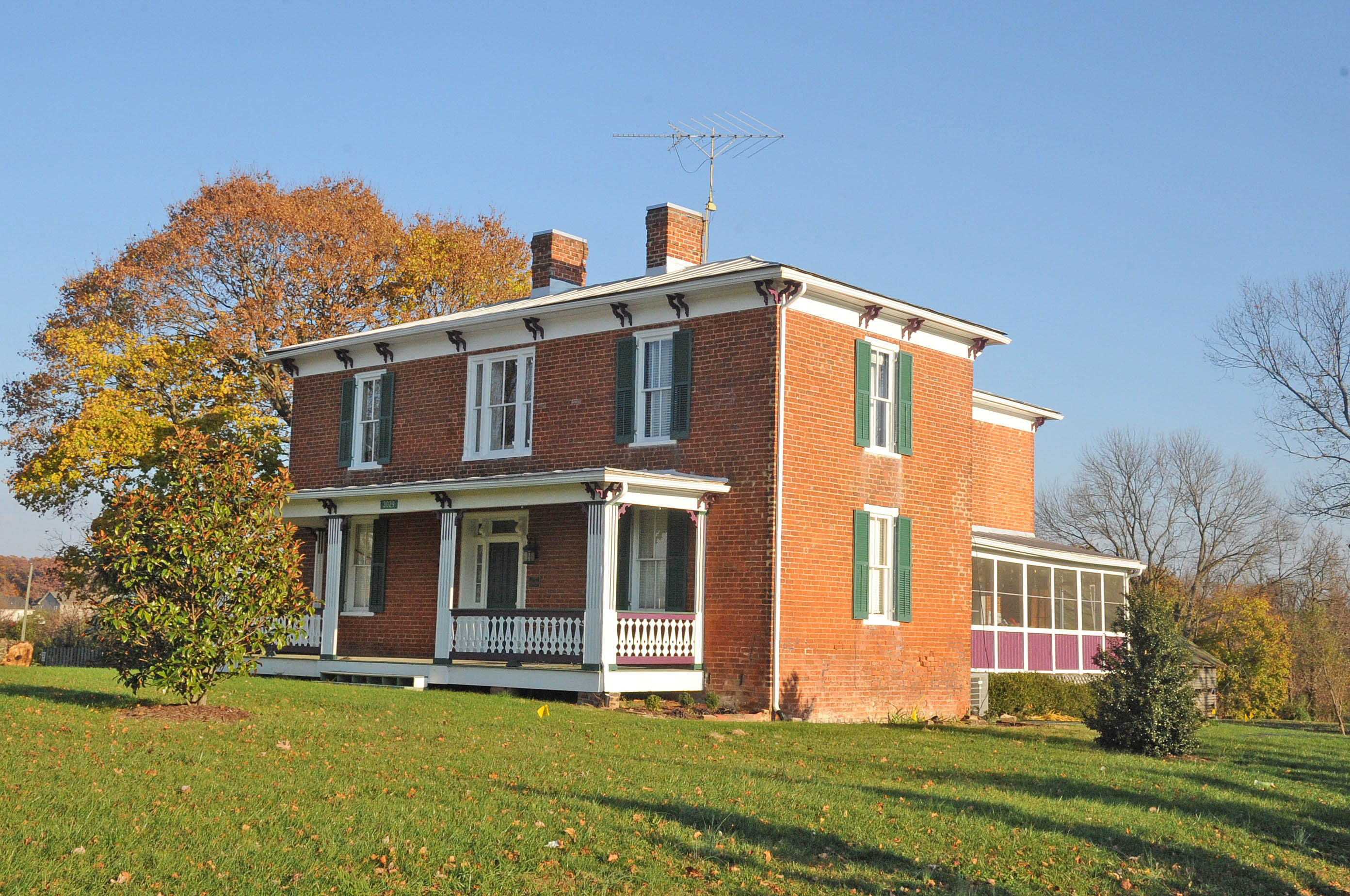
Harper House

== Arts and culture ==
=== Events and festivals ===
Sweet Dreams is a family-friendly, day-long festival held in Stuarts Draft Park each summer since around 2004.

=== Architecture ===
Stuarts Draft has a historic commercial district located along Draft Avenue, formerly Main Street. Surviving structures from the railroad era include the Kube Blacksmith Shop (1928) and the Etter Funeral Home (1895), on the corner of Flory Avenue. Also on Draft Avenue, the Shenvalee Farmhouse (1890) is a Victorian-style house.

Two properties in Stuarts Draft are listed on the National Register of Historic Places. Dating to c. 1857, the Bare House is a Greek Revival and Italianate style brick house, located off Wilda Road. Its related two-story stone mill, now in ruins, operated from 1795 through 1850. Other historic structures on the property include a brick well house and meat house, a small frame barn, and a cistern.

Located on U.S. Route 340 (Stuarts Draft Highway), the Harper House is a two-story brick Italianate-style house from the mid-19th century. Other historic structures on the property that are included in the National Register listing include a large meat house and a two-story frame structure that likely was as a summer kitchen, laundry, and dwelling. There is also a large mortise-and-tenon frame granary.

Another historic property in Stuarts Draft, the Colter House is a two-story brick house located off of Locust Grove Lane. Parts of the Colter House may date to c. 1770. There is also a Craftsman style farmhouse (1901) at 239 Stuart Avenue.

=== Churches ===
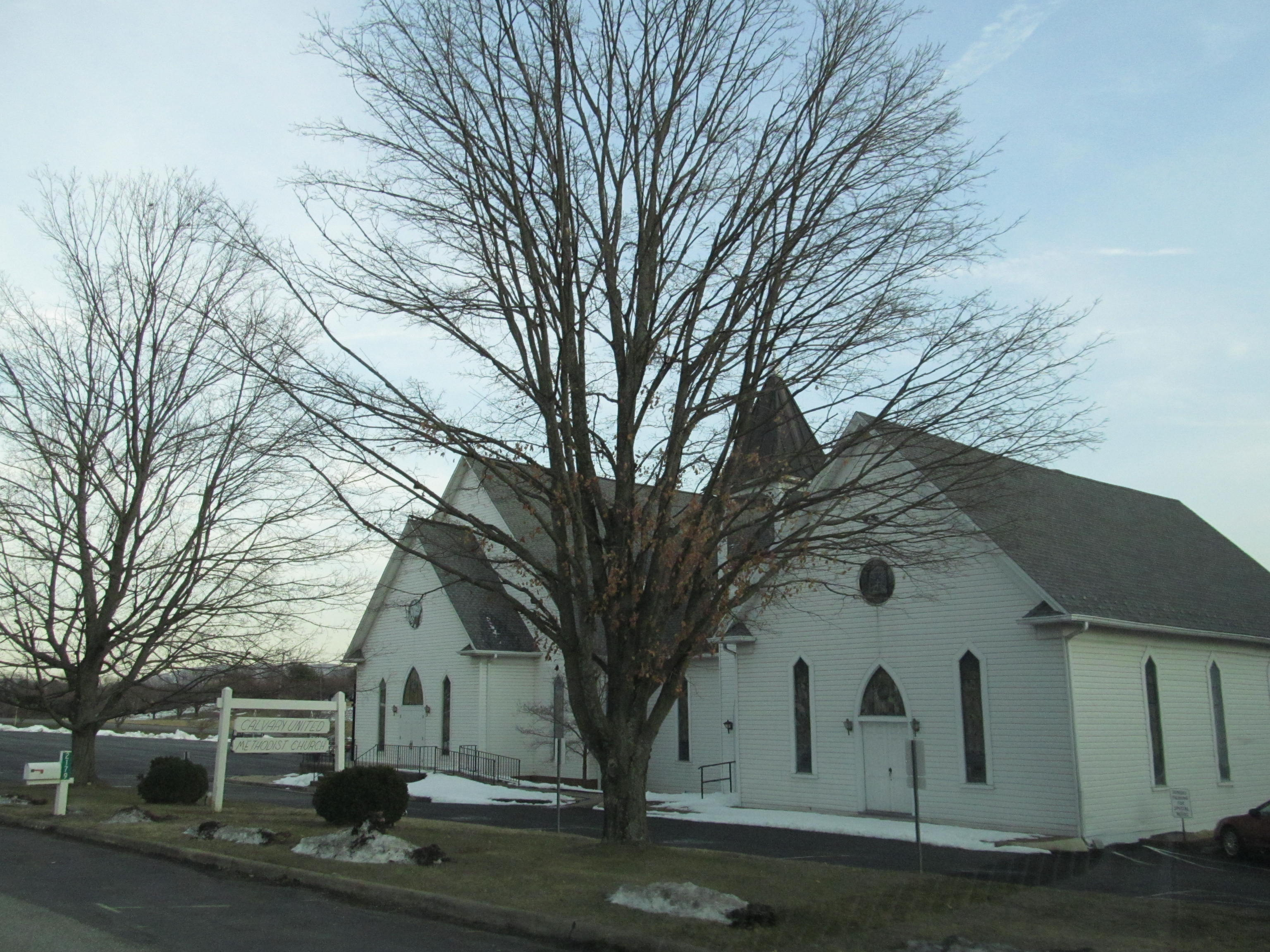
Calvary United Methodist Church

Churches located in Stuarts Draft include: Bible Truth Church, Calvary United Methodist Church, Destiny Family Center (Assemblies of God), Finley Memorial Presbyterian Church, Good Shepard Church of the Nazarene, Greenmonte Mennonite Church, Pilgrim Christian Fellowship (Beachy Amish Mennonite Fellowship), Rankin United Methodist Church, Rejoicing Life Church (International Church of the Foursquare Gospel), Ridgeview Baptist Church (Baptist Bible Fellowship International), Sherando United Methodist Church, Steadfast Church of God in Christ (Pentecostal), Stuarts Draft Baptist Church (Southern Baptist Convention), Stuarts Draft Christian Fellowship, Stuarts Draft Good Shepherd (Nazarene), Stuarts Draft Mennonite Church, Valley Baptist Church (Independent), and White Hill Church of the Brethren.

== Sports ==
Stuarts Draft has a summer baseball league team, the Stuarts Draft Diamondbacks. The team plays at The Diamond Club, leased to it by Augusta County. The Diamondbacks are a member of the Rockingham County Baseball League and were champions in 2012, 2013, 2014, and 2016.

== Parks and recreation ==
Kate Schneider Park is operated by the Stuarts Draft Ruritans and provides three lit baseball fields, one unlit baseball field, a pavilion, and a large horseshoes court. Friendship Park provides a single-lit baseball field.

Stuarts Draft Park is a 13 acres (0.053 km^{2}; 5.3 ha) county-administered facility that opened in 2004. It has a junior Olympic-sized swimming pool, a pool house, the John W. Swett Amphitheater, two baseball fields, two picnic shelters, a playground, two soccer/multi-purpose fields, and a walking trail.

Shenandoah Acres was a popular resort operated and owned by the Blacka family from 1935 to 2004. Billed as "America's Finest Inland Beach", it featured 250 campsites, cabins, horseback riding, tennis courts, a volleyball and softball field, shuffleboard, a fishing pond, a beach area, and a sand-bottom swimming lake. Shenandoah Acres reopened in 2015 as Sun Retreats Shenandoah Valley; the new owners expanded the facilities to 315 campsites and added an arcade. Covering 134 acres (0.54 km^{2}; 54 ha), it is the largest recreation development in the George Washington National Forest area.

The Stuarts Draft Library opened in October 2017; it is part of the Augusta County Library system.

== Government ==
The Augusta County Board of Supervisors governs Stuarts Draft as part of Augusta County. The community's representative is elected from the South River Magisterial District.

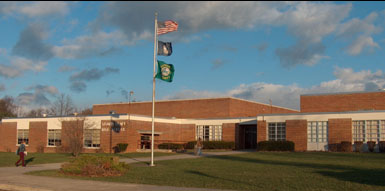
Stuarts Draft High School

== Education ==
Stuarts Draft includes four Augusta County Schools: Guy K. Stump Elementary School, Stuarts Draft Elementary School, Stuarts Draft Middle School, and Stuarts Draft High School. The expanded CDP is also served by Beverley Manor Middle School, Riverheads Elementary School, and Riverheads High School.

Private schools in Stuarts Draft include Pilgrim Christian School, which offers grades one through twelve, and Ridgeview Christian School which teaches grades pre-kindergarten through twelve.

== Infrastructure ==
=== Transportation ===
==== Public transit ====
Brite Bus provides public transportation through its Stuarts Draft Link. The link connects Stuarts Draft to Fishersville, Waynesboro, and employment and healthcare locations.

==== Primary routes ====
Major highways in Stuarts Draft include U.S. Route 340 (Stuarts Draft Highway). It is also close to intersections with Interstate 81 and Interstate 64. Stuarts Draft's primary roads include SR 608 (Cold Springs Road/Tinkling Spring Road/Draft Avenue), SR 610 (Howardsville Turnpike), SR 624 (Lyndhurst Road), SR 633 (Patton Farm Road), SR 634 (Patton Farm Road), SR 635 (Mount Vernon Road/Augusta Farms Road), SR 639 (Wayne Avenue), SR 660 (Lake Road), and SR 664 (Lyndhurst Road).

=== Health care ===
Stuarts Draft has a variety of primary and specialty care medical practices, including offices affiliated with the University of Virginia Health System and Augusta Health. Its closest hospital in Augusta Health, a 255-bed facility in Fishersville. Augusta Health is a research affiliate of the Duke Cancer Institute.

=== Utilities ===
The Augusta County Service Authority provides public water through the South River Water System and sewer service through the Stuarts Draft Waste Water Treatment Plant. Dominion Energy and Shenandoah Valley Electric Cooperative provide electricity to the area.

=== Public safety ===
The Stuarts Draft Volunteer Fire Company and Stuarts Draft Rescue Squad provide public safety services to Stuarts Draft.

== Notable people ==
- Shonn Bell, professional football player
- John Colter, a member of the Lewis and Clark Expedition
- George Harris, professional wrestler
- James Patton, merchant, pioneer frontiersman, and soldier
- Susan Swecker, chair of the Democratic Party of Virginia
- Brian Whitesell, NASCAR team manager
- Kenneth R. Whitesell, vice admiral in the United States Navy
