= AIMC =

"AIMC" may refer to:

- Allama Iqbal Medical College, a medical school located at Lahore, Punjab, Pakistan
- All India Mahila Congress, the women's wing of the Congress Party
- Altra Industrial Motion, a global manufacturer of power transmission products, traded on the NASDAQ stock exchange under the symbol AIMC
- Associate of the Inner Magic Circle
- Associate Member of the Institute of Management Consultants, a professional body representing management consultants
