= Bare House and Mill =

Historic house in Virginia, United States

- U.S. National Register of Historic Places
- Virginia Landmarks Register
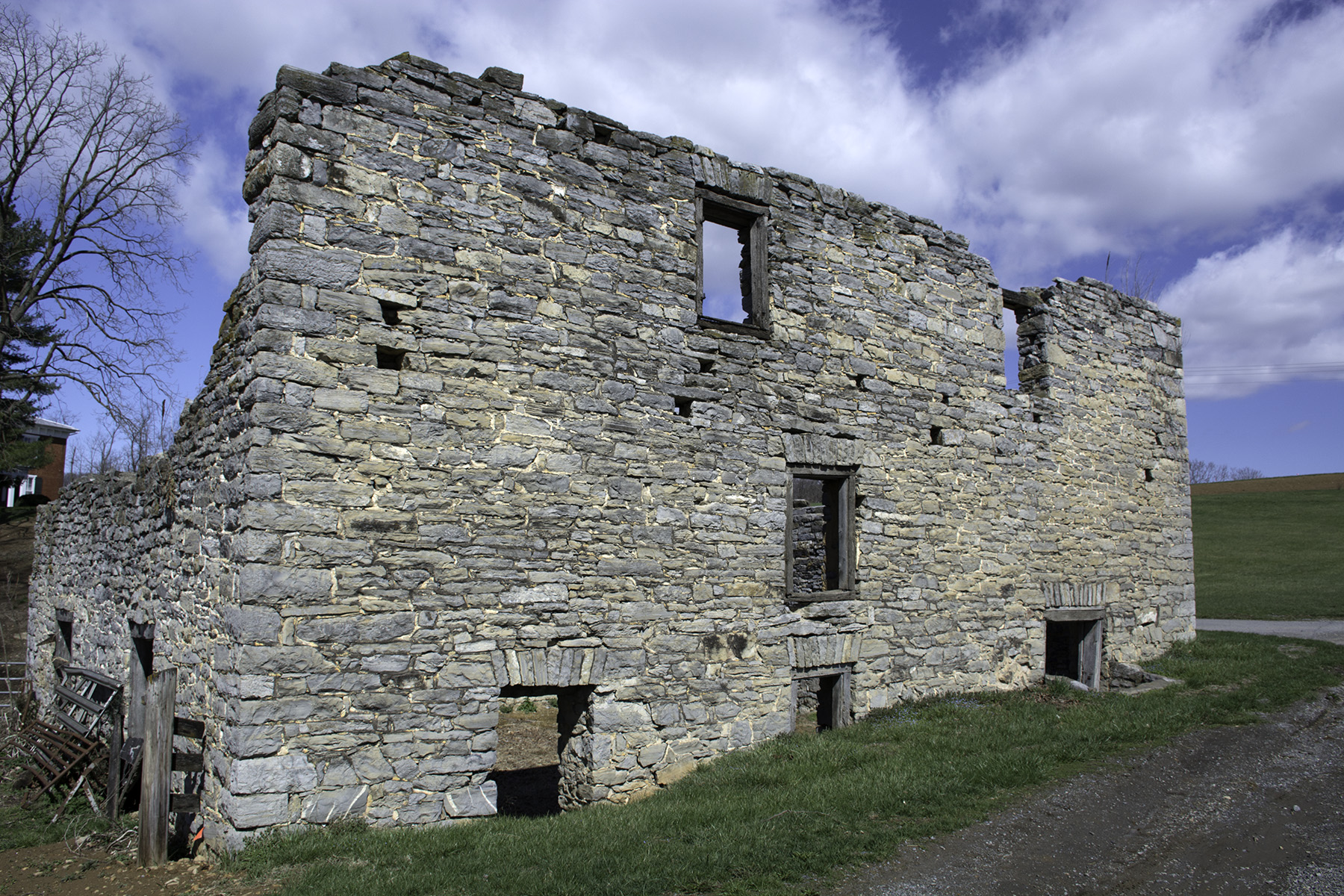
- Ruins of the mill, 2015

- Location within Virginia Location within the United States
- Location: 157 Wilda Rd., Stuarts Draft, Virginia
- Coordinates: 38°1′36″N 79°5′40″W
- Area: 15 acres (6.1 ha)
- Built: c. 1800, c. 1857
- Architectural style: Greek Revival, Italianate
- NRHP reference No.: 02001364
- VLR No.: 007-0834

Significant dates
- Added to NRHP: November 21, 2002
- Designated VLR: September 11, 2002

Bare House and Mill is a historic home with a grist mill and other ruins located at Stuarts Draft, Augusta County, Virginia, completed in 1857. It is a two-story, three-bay brick dwelling with only a few exterior and interior modifications since it was built. Also on the property are an associated wellhouse and meathouse (c. 1860), barn (c. 1900, 1998), privy, cistern, and pumphouse. The ruins of the Bare Mill and related mill race and piers are also located on the property.

It was listed on the National Register of Historic Places in 2002.

== History and description ==
Jacob Bare purchased 260 acres (110 ha) on the South River in 1791 and had probably built the stone grist mill by 1795. He likely added a sawmill in 1808. He moved to Indiana by the mid-1820s and his son John was deeded the property a few years later. Judging by the surviving tax records, the mill was out of operation by 1850. The existing house burned down in 1854 or 1855 and the present structure was completed in 1857.

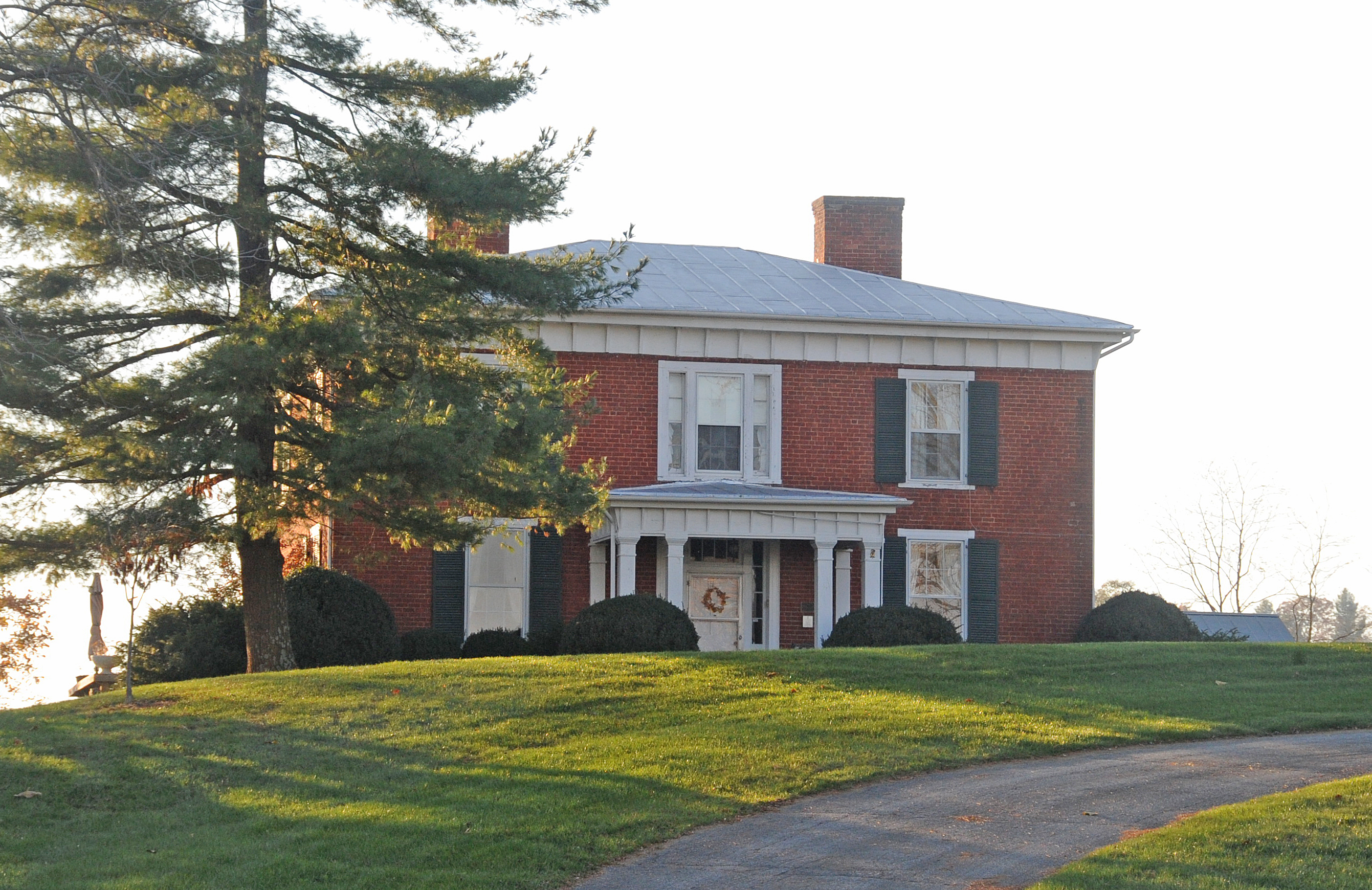
House in 2016

The house is a with Greek Revival- and Italianate-style design influences. It has a metal-sheathed hipped roof and one-story entry porches on the front and rear. "It is constructed in six-course American bond with Flemish variant. The principal decorative feature, the Italianate-influenced cornice, has triangular wood brackets set against a parged frieze. Similar but smaller brackets ornament the cornices of the front and rear porches. The windows are six-over-six with pegged frames, and they have louvered wood shutters of pegged construction on the front and vinyl shutters on the sides and back. One rear basement window has a four-light sash. The front entry has a Greek Revival surround with a four-light transom, four-light sidelights, and carved brackets at the tops of the door jambs. The front and similar back entries and the windows have surrounds with fillet moldings and blank corner blocks. Above the front and back entries in the second story are center windows with sidelights to match the entry sidelights below."

The two-story grist mill had a undershot waterwheel arrangement which was preferred for mills where the fall of water did not exceed 6 feet (1.8 m). The waterwheel was built inside the building, an unusual scheme that had the virtue of protected the wheel from freezing during the winter and reducing the cost of construction by shortening the length of the mill race. The piers may have supported a wooden flume from the head race into the mill. The interior machinery had been removed by 1950 and the mill was used as a general agricultural building. A storm during the 1960s damaged the roof and the building began deteriorating. Some restoration was done during the 1990s.
