= Shenandoah Acres =

Campground in Stuarts Draft, Virginia, US

Shenandoah Acres Campground
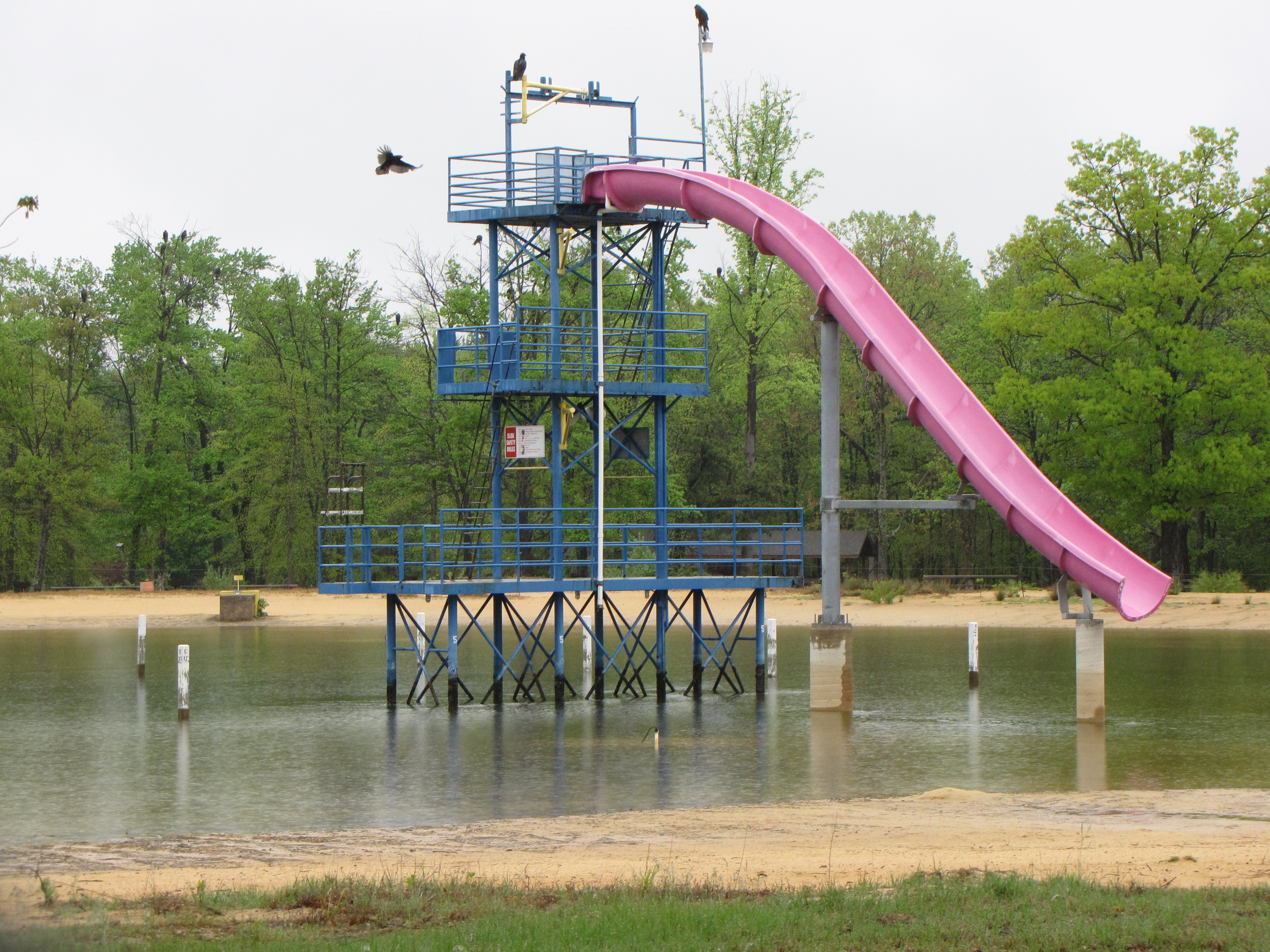
- The Pink Zipper slide, which replaced a cable ride in the early 2000s
- Interactive map of Shenandoah Acres Campground
- Location: Stuarts Draft, Virginia
- Coordinates: 37°59′56.5″N 79°1′36.3″W
- Type: Drive in
- Land: Adjacent to George Washington and Jefferson National Forests
- Facilities: Bath house, lake house, camp store, chapel
- Water: Yes
- Fires: Yes

Shenandoah Acres is a campground/resort in Stuarts Draft, Virginia. It was previously known as Shenandoah Acres Resort, but after decades of operation, 'The Acres' closed in 2004. Then, following a couple of ownership changes, it reopened in 2014 as Shenandoah Acres Family Campground.

The most visible aspect of Shenandoah Acres is its small, spring-fed lake that was unique for its use of playground equipment in the water. Shenandoah Acres also featured 250 camp sites, 35 cabins, horseback riding, miniature golf, and tennis courts.

== History ==
Shenandoah Acres was a farm owned by Dr. William Dodge in the 1930s. He charged visitors ten cents to swim and picnic on the property.

The property was purchased by Rupert A. Blacka in 1935, and developed into a water park. He transformed the small, rather muddy swimming area into a nice, clear lake. In 1948, a concrete pier with a diving board and a zip-line were added. However, due to rising insurance rates, the diving boards were removed in the 1960s. The campground was later added, along with horseback riding, miniature golf, tennis, bike rentals, a ball field, and hiking trails, as well as horseshoes, croquet, shuffleboard, and volleyball. In 2000, again due to ever-increasing insurance costs, the zip lines were removed. Admissions dropped, and 'The Acres' eventually closed in 2004.

Goodfaith LLC purchased Shenandoah Acres in 2005. They reopened the campground in 2009, and operated as Mountain Spring Resort. The property changed hands again in 2011, and the new owners changed its name back to Shenandoah Acres, with plans to reopen the lake in spring 2012.

In 2014, Garland Eutsler and ShenAcres Holdings LLC purchased the property, with plans to reopen it as a resort. On Memorial Day weekend, 2014, Shenandoah Acres re-opened for business. Although primarily a campground, the lake is open once again, and the current owners have been adding back some of the features that gave it its resort flavor. It is still open for business today.

== Ecology ==
Originally, Shenandoah Acres was a farm consisting of orchards, and a cranberry bog encircling a small pond. The cranberry bog was well known by botanists as a location for several rare plants and orchids including the rose pogonia and grass pink orchids. In the journal Claytonia, the botanist Lloyd Carr described the pond as a sea of pink when the orchids were in bloom. The cranberry bog was one of a series of sinkhole ponds and wetlands in the Maple Flats area; perhaps the only one remaining with a similar flora is Spring Pond. After the bog was destroyed to create Shenandoah Acres, many of the rare species once found there became locally extinct.

Since Dr. Dodge was also responsible for introducing cranberries to nearby Green Pond, it's possible that the cranberries growing there came originally from what is now Shenandoah Acres.
