= Genteq =

- Company type: Subsidiary
- Industry: Electric Motors & Controls; HVAC
- Founded: 1955: Regal founded 2004: Regal acquired GE's electric motors and capacitors business 2009: Motors and capacitors business renamed Genteq
- Headquarters: Fort Wayne, Indiana, United States
- Area served: Worldwide
- Key people: Paul Goldman (V.P., HVACR division); Paul Selking (HVAC industry leader)
- Products: ECM motors capacitors
- Number of employees: 13,000
- Parent: Regal-Beloit
- Website: www.genteqmotors.com www.regal-beloit.com www.genteqcomfort.com

Genteq is a subsidiary of Regal-Beloit Corporation, one of the largest manufacturers of electric motors in the world. Genteq is the rebranding of Regal's GE ECM, GE Capacitors and GE Commercial Motors divisions, which occurred in 2009.

Genteq develops and manufactures electronically commutated motors (ECM) and capacitors for residential and light commercial heating and air conditioning (HVAC) systems. The company is based in Fort Wayne, Indiana, with manufacturing facilities in Mexico.

Genteq is the developer of BLAC motor technology, and the DEC Star blower.

DEC Star blower technology has been developed into the DEC Star Fan Panel System, a development made by IBEC: Innovative Building Energy Controls, a Kansas corporation headed by Dave Ogle, Kansas Master Mechanical and the developer of the Net Positive RTU using the DECStar technology.

DEC Star Fan Panels are both a retro-fit, and new manufacturing application for large energy reductions in commercial HVAC applications.

DEC Star blower technology is a key component to the Power Scout program, a comprehensive approach to building/facility wide energy and demand reductions.

Genteq markets its products to original equipment manufacturers (OEMs), as well as to HVAC contractors, distributors and technicians.

== History ==
Regal acquired General Electric’s Commercial and HVACR Motors and Capacitors businesses in 2004. These acquisitions from General Electric effectively doubled Regal's size.

As part of that acquisition, Regal acquired the rights to use the GE brand through 2009. Nearing the end of that licensing period, Regal rebranded these divisions as Genteq in February 2009.

General Electric developed an Electronically Commutated Motor (also called Electronically Controlled Motor), or ECM, technology for use in residential and light commercial heating and air conditioning systems in North America in the mid-1980s. The GE ECM motor was the first ultra-high efficiency motor for home heating and air conditioning systems, providing greater home comfort and energy efficiency.

The DEC Star blower was added to the Genteq product line in 2014.

The DEC Star Fan Panel system began development in 2015, and is currently available now, in 2016 through the IBEC corporation. www.ibec-group.com.
