= Harper House (Stuarts Draft, Virginia) =

Historic house in Virginia, United States

- U.S. National Register of Historic Places
- Virginia Landmarks Register
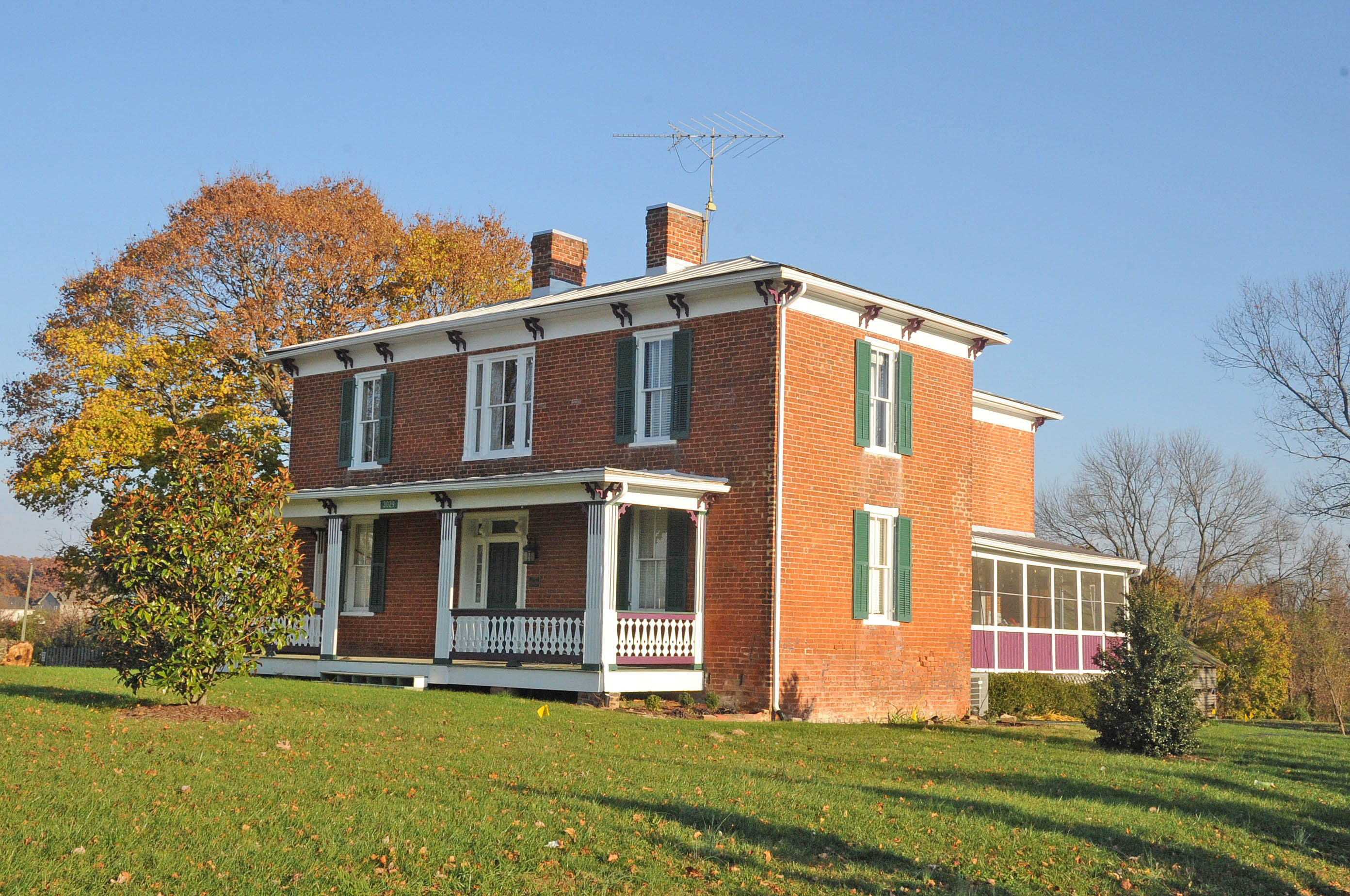

- Location within Virginia Location within the United States
- Location: 3029 Stuarts Draft Hwy., Stuarts Draft, Virginia
- Coordinates: 38°2′24″N 79°1′10″W
- Area: 1.3 acres (0.53 ha)
- Built: 1888
- Architectural style: Italianate
- NRHP reference No.: 05001623
- VLR No.: 007-0233

Significant dates
- Added to NRHP: February 1, 2006
- Designated VLR: December 7, 2005

Harper House is a historic home located at Stuarts Draft, Augusta County, Virginia, built about 1888. The two-story house was built in the Italianate style.

It was listed on the National Register of Historic Places in 2006.

== History and description ==
Joseph Harper had acquired the land upon which Harper House sits by 1850. His son Samuel bought out his brothers and was the sole owner of the property by 1875. Samuel's son John J. and his wife had moved there in 1870 to manage the farm for the family and inherited it when his father died in 1885. Tax records from 1888 show an increase in the value of buildings on the property which probably reflects the building of the new house. As of 2006, the house remains in the hands of Joseph Harper's descendants. The house is a two-story, brick dwelling with a metal-sheathed hip roof with a bracketed cornice and a one-story front porch on highly decorative wood supports It has a two-story rear ell. Also on the property are a contributing meathouse, workshop, garage, windmill support, and granary.
