= Regal Rexnord =

American manufacturing company

Regal Rexnord Corporation
- Type: Public
- Traded as: NYSE: RRX; S&P 400 component
- Industry: Electric Motors & Controls
- Predecessors: Regal Beloit Corporation; Rexnord Corporation
- Founded: 1955; 71 years ago
- Headquarters: Milwaukee, Wisconsin, U.S.
- Number of locations: 14 Offices
- Area served: Worldwide
- Key people: Aamir Paul (CEO)
- Products: Electric HVAC motors; electrical generators; high voltage induction motor; slip ring motor; low voltage AC motors; DC motors; capacitors; electrical connector devices; gears; gear boxes; automotive transmissions; marine transmissions; cutting tools; military terminal blocks; fuseholders and 'Made in the USA' power distribution blocks; automotive ring and pinions
- Revenue: ▲US$6.25 billion (2023)
- Operating income: ▼US$377 million (2023)
- Net income: ▼US$−54 million (2023)
- Total assets: ▲US$15.4 billion (2023)
- Total equity: ▼US$6.34 billion (2023)
- Number of employees: c. 32,100 (2023)
- Subsidiaries: Altra Industrial Motion; Century; Durst; Fasco; Genteq; Marathon Electric; Mastergear Worldwide; LEESON Electric; Thomson Technology
- Website: regalrexnord.com

Regal Rexnord Corporation is a manufacturer of electric motors and power transmission components based in Milwaukee, Wisconsin. The company has manufacturing, sales, and service facilities throughout the United States, Canada, Mexico, Europe, and Asia, with about 29,000 employees.

One of the largest electric motor manufacturers in the world, its Genteq brand brushless DC electric motors are found in almost all variable speed residential HVAC equipment in the United States today, and its GE Commercial Motors, Leeson, and Marathon Electric Motor brands are used throughout the industrial sector. As of 2021, the company is ranked 763rd on the Fortune 1000, and was the 17th largest corporation in Wisconsin.

== History ==
The company was founded in 1955 as Beloit Tool Corporation, and began operations in a converted roller rink. In 1961, it moved to facilities in South Beloit, Illinois, and in 1969 it changed its name to Regal Beloit. In the 1980s the company expanded its product line with a series of acquisitions of smaller companies, and in 1991 its headquarters were moved to downtown Beloit. One of Regal's acquisitions was Marathon Special Products, producing terminal blocks, power distribution blocks, and fuseholders manufactured in Bowling Green, Ohio, with new products being added regularly in addition to the Kulka brand. In 2004, two acquisitions from General Electric effectively doubled the size of the company.

In July 2007, Regal acquired the Fasco electrical components business of Tecumseh Products for $220 million in cash. In 2007, Regal Beloit corporation USA acquired the Alstom India Motors and Fans business and named it Marathon Electric Motors India Limited. In October 2008, Regal acquired the Dutchi Motors B. V. for $34 million in cash and $3.2 million in net liabilities. In April 2010, the company acquired CMG Engineering Group, a manufacturer of industrial motors, blowers and metal products headquartered in Melbourne, Australia for $75 million in cash.

In 2011, the company completed the largest acquisition in its history by purchasing A.O. Smith's Electrical Products Company. The acquisition added about $700 million in sales revenues further expanding the company in Mexico and China, while adding new products to its production lines. On July 9, 2013, Regal Beloit announced that its plant in Springfield, Missouri, would face a staged closing over the next 18 months, impacting 330 employees. On June 5, 2014, Regal Beloit announced the further closing of two plants in Kentucky, a staged closing over the next 18 months that is affecting over 200 employees.

Regal Beloit acquired Power Transmission Solutions business (PTS) from Emerson Electric Co. of St. Louis, Missouri for approximately $1.4 billion—$1.4 billion in cash plus $40 million of assumed liabilities, effective from Jan 30th, 2015. The business manufactures, sells and services bearings, couplings, gearing, drive components, and conveyor systems under brands including Browning, Jaure, Kop-Flex, McGill, Morse, Rollway, Sealmaster, and System Plast. With annual revenues of approximately $600 million, PTS has over 3,000 employees around the world. PTS became part of Regal's newly defined Power Transmission segment. In 2019, Regal Beloit America announced it would be closing its Durst Power Transmission plant in Shopiere, Wisconsin. The closure began on January 31, 2020 and affected approximately 60 employees. In October 2021, Regal Beloit Corporation completed its merger with Rexnord Corporation, creating Regal Rexnord Corporation.

In November 2021, Regal Rexnord closed on the $297 million acquisition of Arrowhead Systems LLC, which has Wisconsin operations in Randolph and Oshkosh. In March 2023, the company acquired its rival Altra Industrial Motion in Braintree, Massachusetts for about $5 billion including debt. In September 2023, the company sold its industrial electric motors and generators business of the Marathon, Cemp, and Rotor brands to rival WEG S.A. for $400 million.

== Marathon Electric Motors (India) Limited ==
Marathon Electric Kolkata started its journey as GEC UK, after the European Union was formed GEC of the UK and Alsthom of France merged to form GEC Alsthom. The company became Alstom. In 2007, Regal Rexnord Corporation of USA acquired Alstom India's motor and fan business and was named "Marathon Electric Motors India Limited".

Marathon Kolkata manufactures both LT induction & Large HT induction motors for domestic, commercial, and industrial segments. The motors are available as per industry requirements of the safe area and hazardous area applications. Marathon makes axial, propeller and centrifugal industrial fans.

Marathon Electric Motors has these manufacturing facilities:

- Kolkata works for HT and LT motors
- Ahmedabad works for LT motors

Additionally, Marathon India has 2 "global technology centers". One is in Hyderabad, another is in Pune, and there is a manufacturing facility for FHP and LT motors located in Faridabad.

== Global Technology Centre - India (GTCI) ==
Located in Hyderabad and Pune, GTCI is an engineering and info-tech hub, where engineering and IT teams operate in collaboration with worldwide Regal Rexnord centers. Hyderabad GTCI was established in August 2005 and Pune GTCI in July 2015. The centers are global R & D support arms of the Regal Rexnord Corporation.
