= Rexnord Corporation =

American engineering company

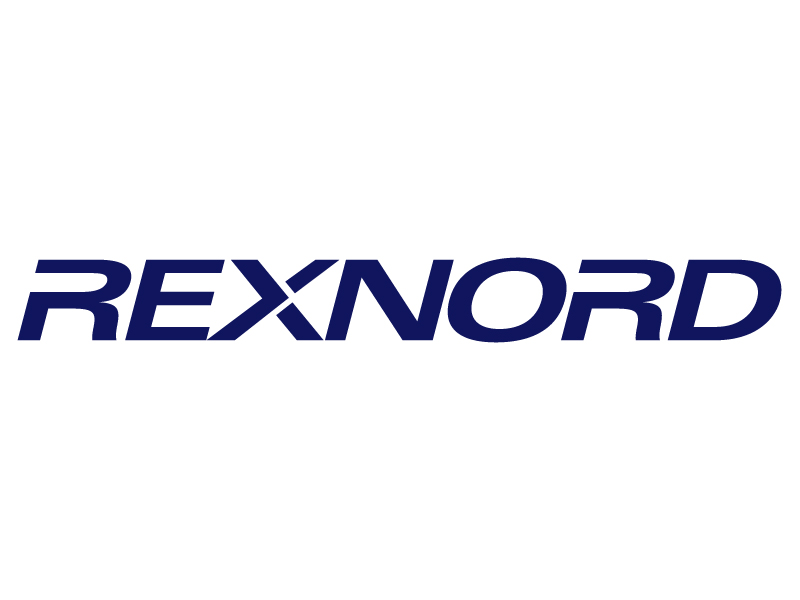
- Company type: Subsidiary
- Founded: 1891; 135 years ago
- Founder: Christopher Levalley
- Headquarters: 511 W Freshwater Way, Milwaukee, United States
- Owner: Regal Rexnord Corporation
- Number of employees: 8,000 (2016)
- Website: https://www.regalrexnord.com/

Rexnord Corporation is a Milwaukee, Wisconsin-based subsidiary of Regal Rexnord Corporation. It was founded in 1891 by Christopher Levalley and incorporated in 1892 as the Chain Belt Company. It had $67.5 million in profit and $1.9 billion in sales in 2016. The company was the focus of a critical investigation by the New York Times, as an Indianapolis-based facility was to be moved from the US to Mexico in 2017.

== History ==
Rexnord was founded as the Chain Belt Company by inventor Christopher W. Levalley at the age of 58. Levalley, along with Chain Belt co-founders F.W. Sivyer and W.A. Draves, held the first board of directors meeting on September 9, 1891. Chain Belt was incorporated in the state of Wisconsin on February 24, 1892.

Rexnord Corporations consists of two main divisions: Process and Motion Control (which focuses on industrial drives, gears, bearings, conveying systems, electronic controls, and associated software, as well as airplane mechanical parts), and Water Management (which is focused on plumbing components and related appurtenances for commercial, industrial, municipal, and institutional settings).

In 2016, Rexnord opened its new Water Management platform headquarters in Milwaukee, Wisconsin.

In December 2016, President-elect Donald Trump criticized the company for closing its Indianapolis operations, leaving all 300+ employees at the facility without jobs, as Rexnord Corporation moved the facility to Monterey Mexico to capitalize on the cheap labor available in the region.

In April 2021, Rexnord completed the spin-off of its Water Management Division as Zurn Water Solutions Corporation.

In October 2021, Rexnord completed its merger with Regal Beloit Corporation, creating Regal Rexnord Corporation.
