= Altra Industrial Motion =

American power transmission manufacturer

Altra Industrial Motion Corp.
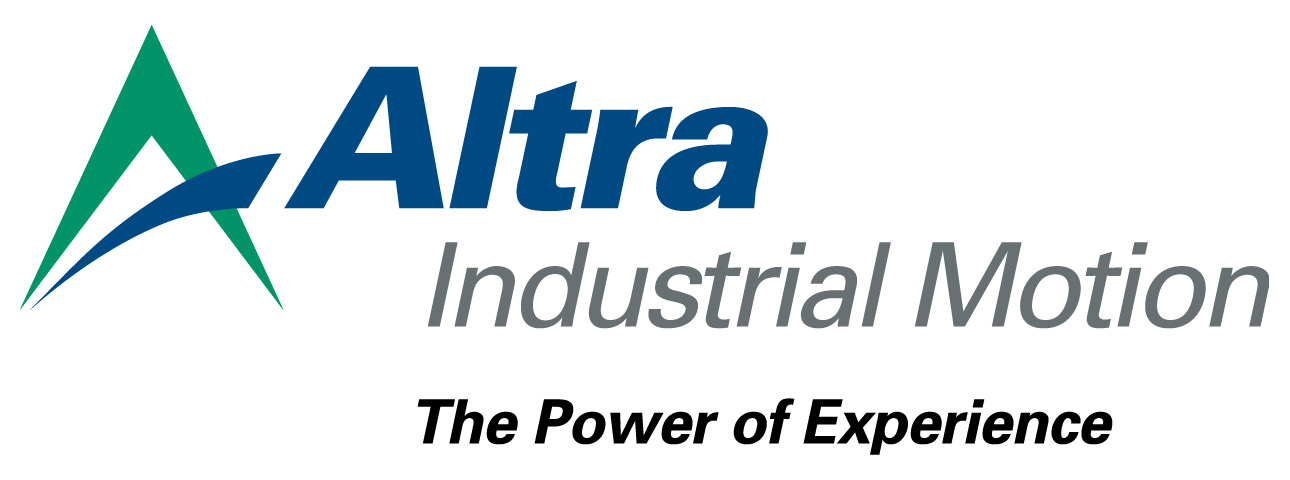

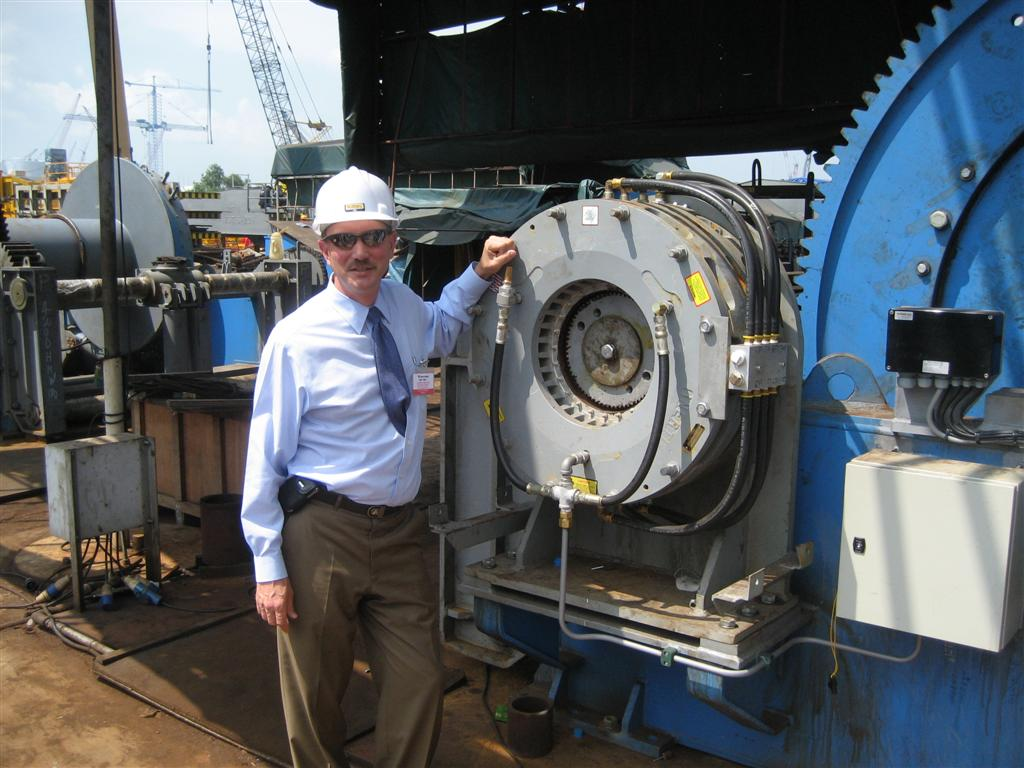
- Altra CEO Carl Christenson together with a Wichita Clutch KopperKool brake on an anchor winch in Singapore
- Type: Subsidiary
- Traded as: Nasdaq: AIMC
- Industry: Manufacturing - Power Transmission
- Founded: 2004; 22 years ago
- Headquarters: Braintree, Massachusetts, United States
- Key people: Carl Christenson (president & CEO); Todd Patriacca (CFO); David Ebling (General Manager)
- Number of employees: 10,000
- Parent: Regal Rexnord (2023-present)
- Divisions: Electric Clutches & Brakes; Couplings, Clutches & Brakes; Gearing
- Website: altramotion.com

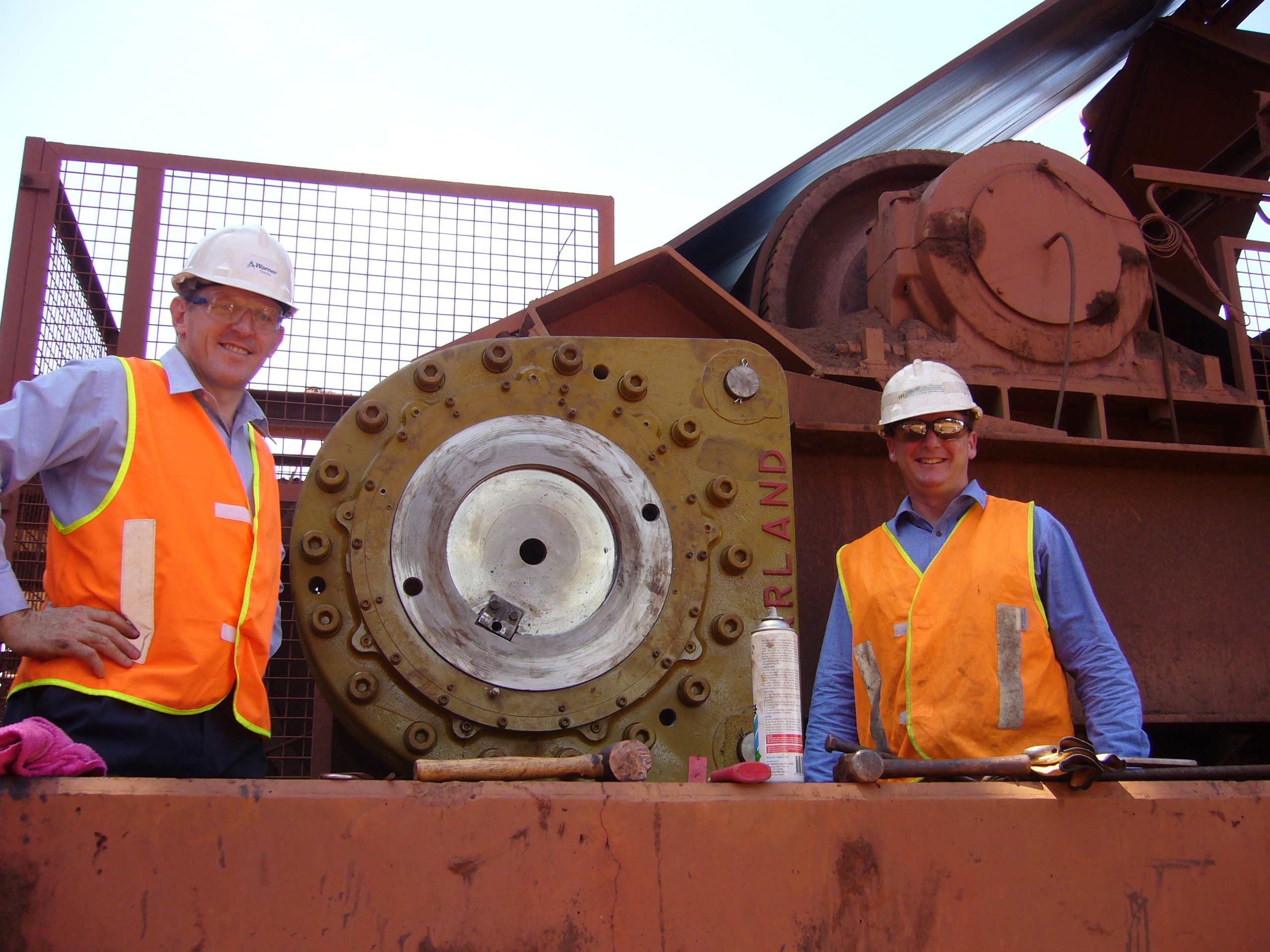
A Marland Clutch installed at the coal loading facility in Port Hedland, WA, Australia, together with two employees from Altra's sales and support office in Castle Hill, NSW.

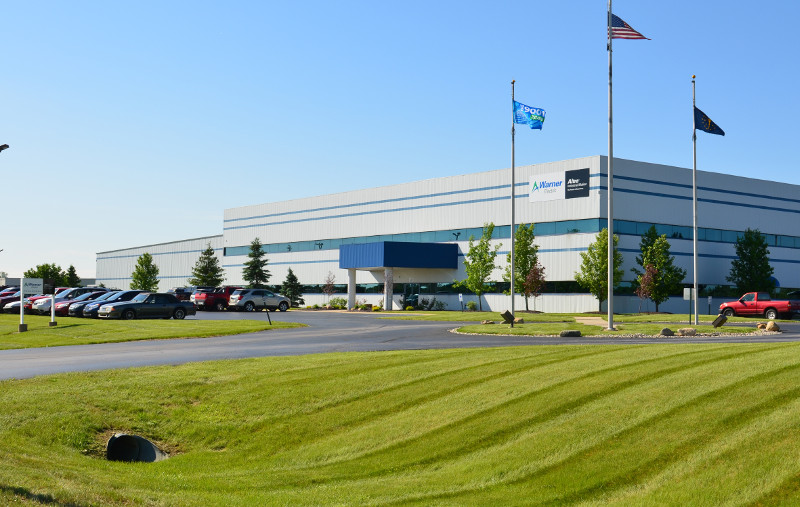
Warner Electric's United States facility and grounds in Columbia City, Indiana.

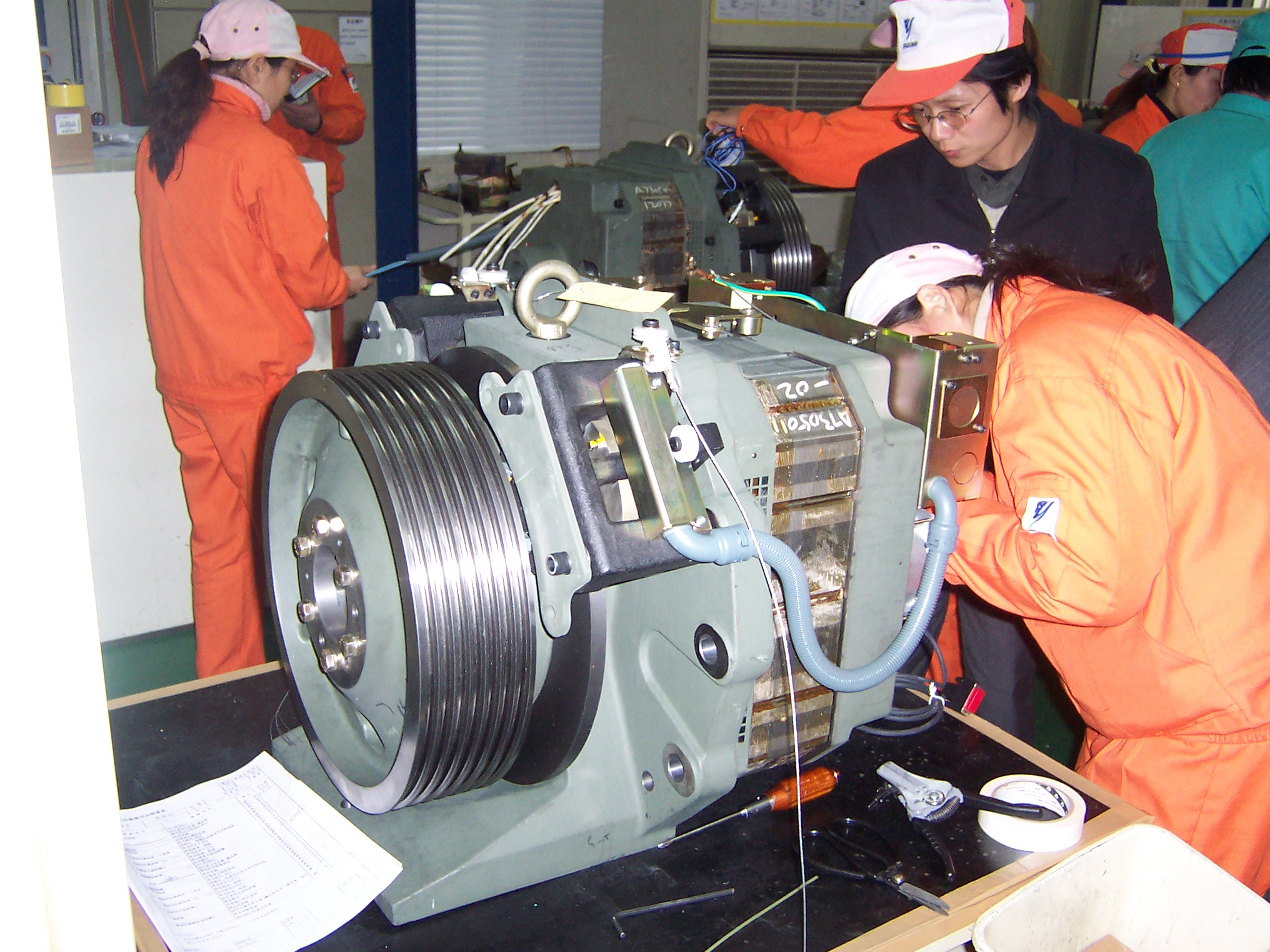
A Warner Electric elevator brake installed on a Japanese traction motor.

Altra Industrial Motion Corp. is an American manufacturer of mechanical power transmission products – brakes, clutches, couplings, and the like. The company is headquartered in Braintree, Massachusetts.

While the products sound automotive to the layman, in fact most Altra products are used on industrial machinery, such as fail-safe brakes for elevators and forklifts, gearboxes on conveyors, heavy duty brakes on mining equipment, clutches for beverage capping equipment, etc.

Altra is the parent company of several power transmission industry brands, including: Ameridrives, Boston Gear, Warner Electric, TB Wood's, Stieber Clutch, Twiflex, Matrix International and Wichita Clutch.

On March 27, 2023, the company was acquired by Regal Rexnord Corp.

== History ==
The company was founded in 2004 through the acquisition of the Colfax Power Transmission Group (CPTG) and Kilian Manufacturing by private equity firm Genstar Capital. Which, at the time, consisted of several brands, including Ameridrives, Boston Gear, Formsprag, Marland, Nuttall/Delroyd, Stieber, Warner Electric and Wichita Clutch.

Following the foundation, Altra has made several strategic acquisitions, including TB Wood's, Hay Hall (Bibby, Matrix, Twiflex, Huco, and Inertia Dynamics), Svendborg Brakes, Bauer Gear Motor, Guardian Couplings, Lamiflex Couplings, and Bear Linear (now Warner Linear), Kollmorgen Corp, Thomson Linear, Portescap, Jacobs Vehicle Systems.

While Altra is a relatively young company, the brands have been in existence for many, many years. The brands and the year they were founded are as follows:

TB Wood's (1857)
Boston Gear (1877)
Svendborg Brakes (1884)
Nuttall Gear (1897)
Bibby Transmissions (1919)
Kilian Manufacturing (1922)
Delroyd Worm Gear (1922)
Warner Electric (1927)
Stromag (1932)
Bauer Gear Motor (1927, de)
Ameridrives (1928)
Industrial Clutch (1930)
Marland Clutch (1931)
Matrix International (1939)
Stieber Clutch (1944)
Twiflex Limited (1946)
Formsprag Clutch (1946)
Guardian (1947)
Centric (1948)
Wichita Clutc (1954)
Huco Engineering (1965)
Inertia Dynamics (1971)
All Power (1986)
Lamiflex (1999)
Bear Linear (2001)

Altra Industrial Motion went public in December, 2006. It trades on the NASDAQ exchange under the symbol AIMC. In 2019, they recorded sales of US$2 billion.

In October 2022, Altra Industrial Motion agreed to be acquired by Regal Rexnord Corp. in a deal worth around $5 billion including debt. The acquisition was completed in March 2023.

== Product platforms ==
Altra's broad product range can be divided into Seven distinct divisions:

- Electric Clutches & Brakes (ECB): The Electric Clutches & Brakes Division consists of four brands that are grouped for maximum engineering and sales efficiency. Warner Electric, Matrix International, Inertia Dynamics and Warner Linear design and manufacture braking and positioning systems that are utilized in global markets including material handling, packaging machinery, food & beverage, elevator & escalator, medical, turf & garden, off-highway, forklift, marine and agriculture.
- Couplings, Clutches & Brakes (CCB): Altra's coupling, heavy-duty clutch and brake, overrunning clutch and belted drive brands are grouped together to allow for extensive cross-brand engineering collaboration. TB Wood's, Ameridrives, Bibby Turboflex, Lamiflex, Ameridrives Power Transmission, and Huco, together with Wichita Clutch, Twiflex Limited, Svendborg Brakes, Industrial Clutch, Formsprag Clutch, Marland Clutch and Stieber Clutch provide drivetrain component solutions for global industries including energy, metals, mining, marine, oil & gas, food processing, pulp & paper, packaging, aerospace & defense, wastewater, concrete, and material handling.
- Gearing: Altra's gear drive, gear motor and engineered bearing brands include Boston Gear, Nuttall Gear, Delroyd Worm Gear, Bauer Gear Motor, and Kilian Manufacturing. These brands offer energy-efficient gearing and bearing solutions designed for industrial applications. Global key markets include metals, food & beverage, energy, wastewater, turf & garden, pulp & paper, textile, concrete, oil & gas, material handling and aerospace.
- Kollmorgen:
- Thomson:
- Jacobs Vehicle Systems:
- Portescap:

== Production locations ==
Altra operates production facilities in the United States, Europe, and Asia. Since the company's founding in 2004, many of the factories produce more than one brand.
