= South River (South Fork Shenandoah River tributary) =

River in Virginia

Coordinates: 38°0′57.9″N 79°1′54.3″W

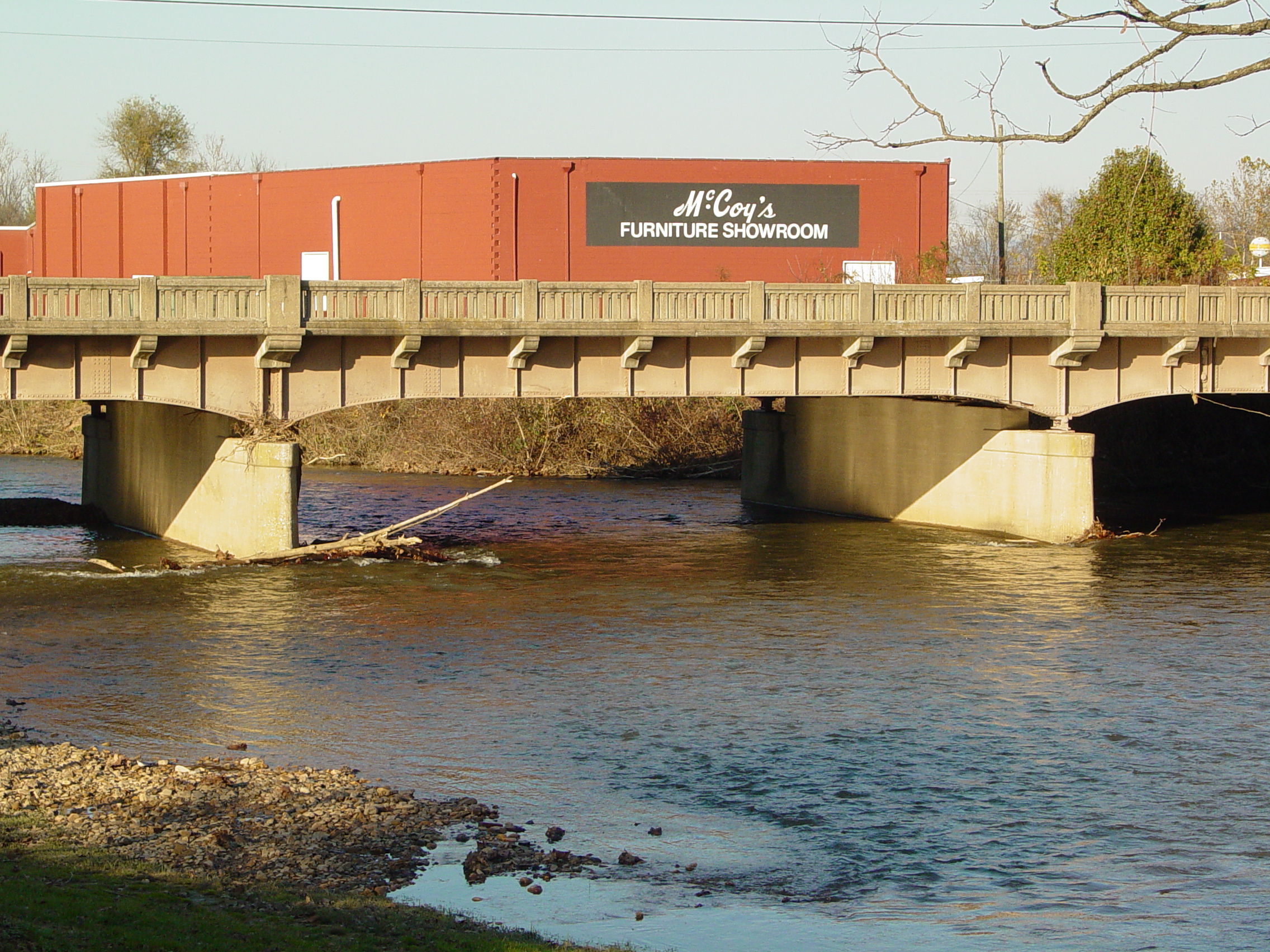
South River in Waynesboro

The South River is one of the two main tributaries of the South Fork of the Shenandoah River. It begins south of Waynesboro, Virginia, and flows northward to Port Republic, where it merges with the North River to form the South Fork. The river is 52.6 miles (84.7 km) long.

== Communities along the route ==
The South River flows through Stuarts Draft, Waynesboro, Dooms, Crimora, Harriston, Grottoes, and Port Republic.

== Ecology ==
In Waynesboro, the DuPont (now Invista) plant and others polluted the river with mercury. The South River in Waynesboro is one of two urban fisheries in the state. There is a fish consumption advisory (mercury) for all species in South River, except for trout. It is recommended by the Virginia Department of Health that no fish be eaten from this river except trout. For more information go to: Virginia Department of Health at: http://www.vdh.virginia.gov/Epidemiology/dee/PublicHealthToxicology/Advisories/

== See also ==
- List of rivers of Virginia
